= Daihatsu Charade =

Supermini car

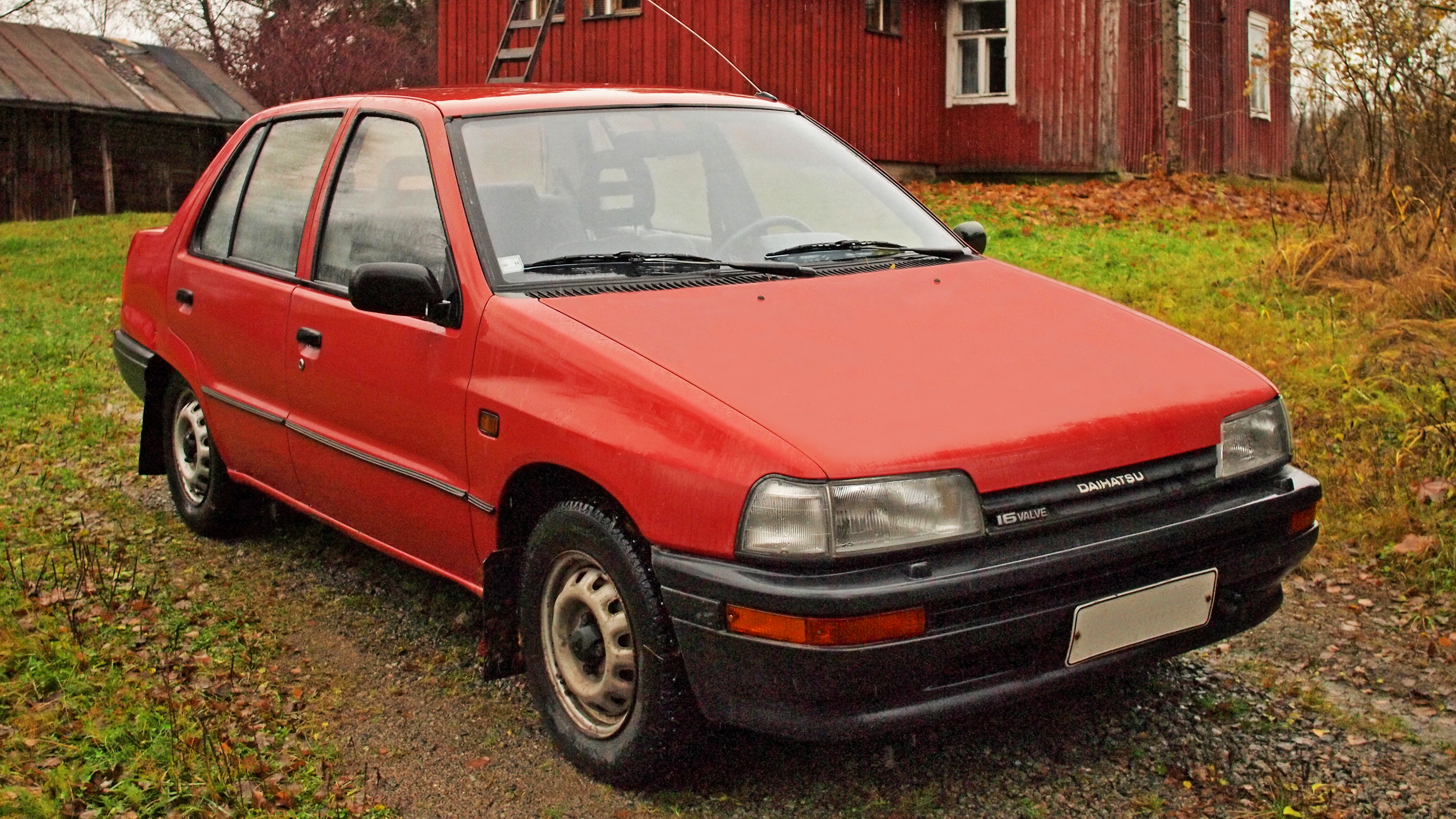
- 1991–1993 Daihatsu Charade (G102) sedan

Overview
- Manufacturer: Daihatsu
- Production: 1977–2000; 1986–2012 (China)

Body and chassis
- Class: Supermini (B)

Chronology
- Predecessor: Daihatsu Consorte
- Successor: Daihatsu Storia/Sirion

The Daihatsu Charade is a supermini car produced by the Japanese manufacturer Daihatsu from 1977 to 2000. It is considered by Daihatsu as a "large compact" or "supermini" car, to differentiate it from the smaller, urban-oriented kei cars in its line-up, such as the Daihatsu Mira. It replaced the Daihatsu Consorte, although the Charmant took over from the bigger-engined Consortes, and did not share a platform with a Toyota product.

In China, the Daihatsu Charade was called Xiali and was produced by Tianjin FAW, under the registered mark of "China FAW". From September 1986 to 2009, it sold over 1.5 million units in that country. The second and third generation Charades also provided the basis for countless unlicensed Chinese copies, often depending on fibreglass moldings. Production ended in 2012.

== First generation (G10, G20; 1977–1983) ==
First generation (G10/G20)
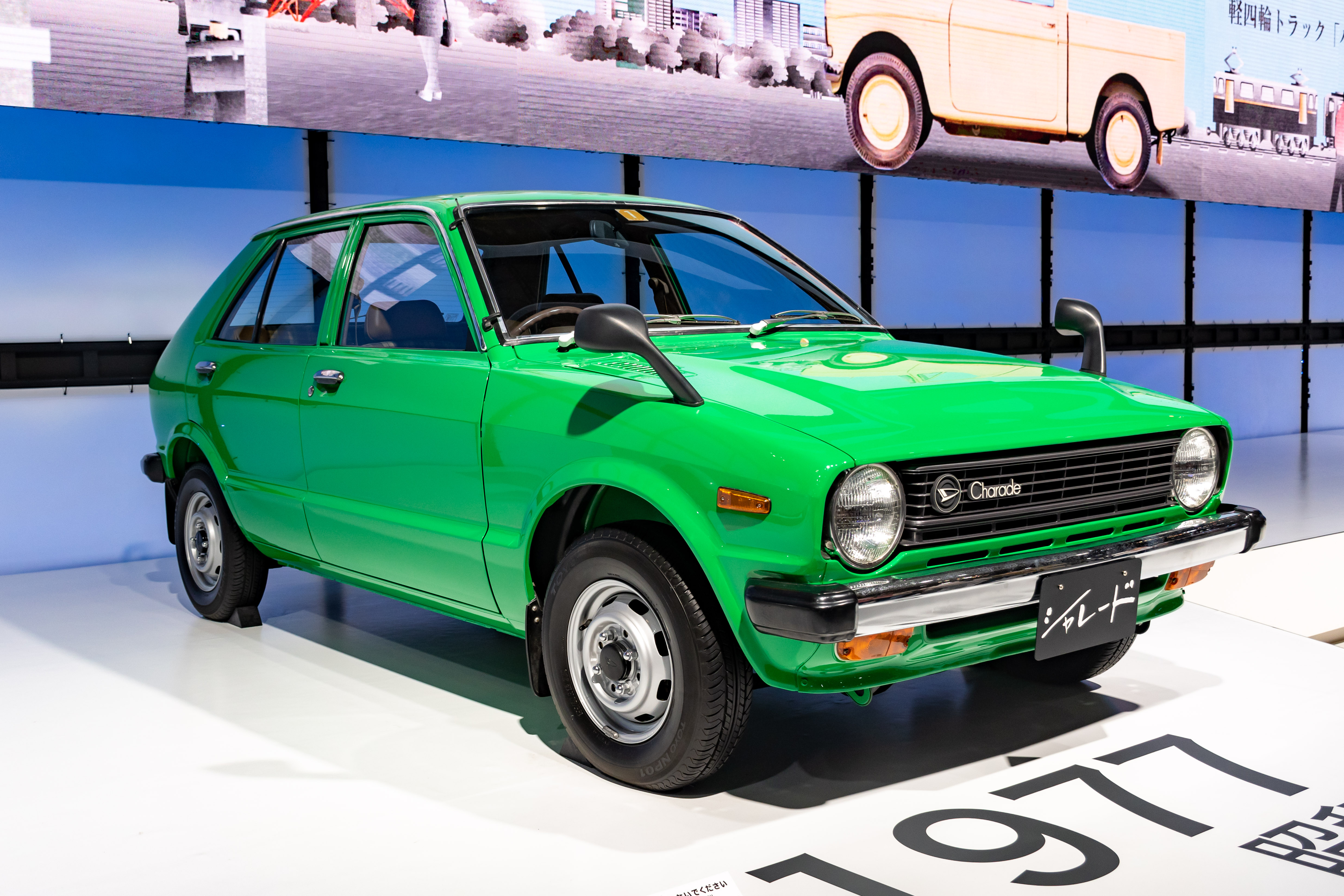
- 1977–1979 Daihatsu Charade 5-door

Overview
- Production: November 1977–1983; 1979–1983 (Indonesia)
- Assembly: Japan: Ikeda, Osaka; Greece: Thebes, Boeotia (Automeccanica); New Zealand: Trentham (General Motors NZ); Indonesia: Sunter, Jakarta (Gaya Motor); Malaysia: Shah Alam, Selangor (AMIM)

Body and chassis
- Body style: 3/5-door hatchback
- Layout: Front-engine, front-wheel-drive
- Related: Automeccanica Zebra (Greece)

Powertrain
- Engine: 843 cc CD I3 (Chile); 993 cc CB10/11/20/31/32 (Note: CB10: 55PS 77–80, CB11: 55PS 80–83, CB20: 50-52PS for worldwide market, CB31: 60PS 79–80 and CB32 (available with automatic transmission) 60PS 80–83.) I3
- Transmission: 4/5-speed manual 2-speed Daimatic automatic

Dimensions
- Wheelbase: 2,300 mm (90.6 in)
- Length: 3,460–3,530 mm (136.2–139.0 in)
- Width: 1,520 mm (59.8 in)
- Height: 1,360 mm (53.5 in)
- Curb weight: 630–705 kg (1,389–1,554 lb)

The first generation (G10) appeared in October 1977. It was a front-engined front-wheel drive car, originally available only as a five-door hatchback, powered by a 993 cc three-cylinder, all-aluminum engine (CB20) with 50 PS (37 kW). Japanese market cars claimed 55 PS (40 kW) JIS at 5,500 rpm. The three-door hatchback version ("Runabout"), introduced in the fall of 1978, received two small circular opera windows in the C-pillars. The Charade was a surprise best-seller in Japan, where ever tighter emissions standards had made many observers consider the one-litre car dead in the marketplace. The Charade became an overnight success and also became the Japanese "Car of the Year" for 1979.

The early G10 (Series 1) had round headlights and the later G10 (Series 2) had square headlights. The Series 2 was introduced in October 1980. Between the introduction in November 1977 and the end of production in December 1982, Daihatsu built 89,792 G10/G20 type Charades. In New Zealand, the facelift version was assembled locally by General Motors New Zealand starting in 1981; the original model had been imported fully built-up from Japan.

The Daihatsu Charade was very popular in Chile and some other Latin American countries during the 1970s and 1980s. Originally the same as in the rest of the world, later Chilean Charades (called G20s) came equipped with a downsleeved 843 cc version (CD) of Daihatsu's three-cylinder engine. This engine produced 41 PS (30 kW) at 5,500 rpm and has also appeared in export versions of the Daihatsu Hijet. The G20 appeared in 1980 and was developed as a result of a Chilean decision to lower import tariffs on cars with engines of less than 850 cc in May 1979.

The G20 was able to run on low-octane fuel or even ethanol. The first G20 version (1978–1981) had round headlights, while the second generation G20 (sold from 1981 to 1984) received the same facelift as did the G10, meaning square headlights and slightly different rear lights. The three-door "Runabout" retained the larger 1-liter CB20 engine, and also received a five-speed manual transmission and a tachometer.

At 1981 Tokyo Motor Show, Daihatsu displayed a 1-liter turbo car concept in collaboration with Italian sports car maker De Tomaso Automobili. This car was based on the 3-door Charade XTE and known as the Charade De Tomaso. This idea was later applied for mass production on the second generation.

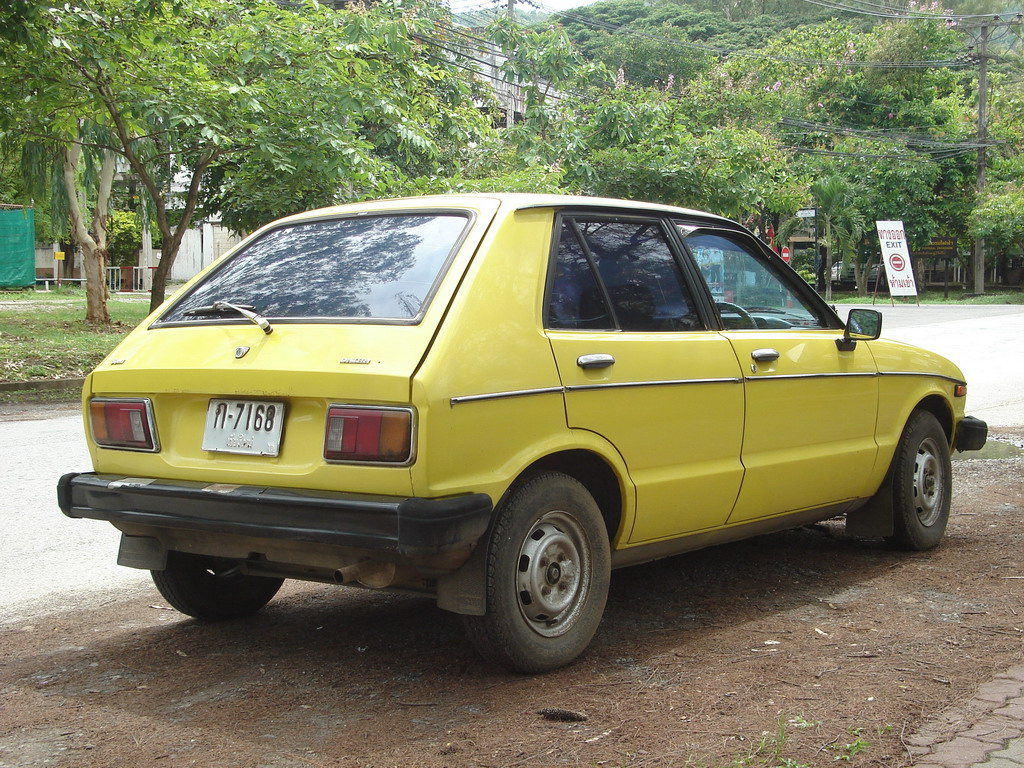
1977–1980 taillights

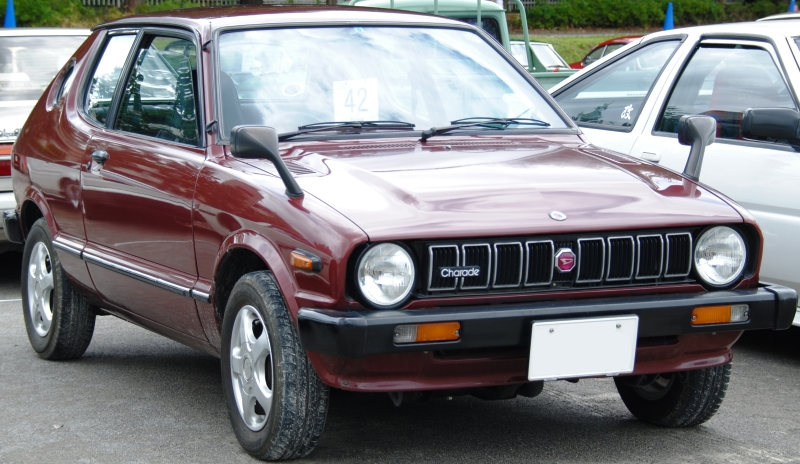
1979–1980 Daihatsu Charade Runabout 3-door (G10)

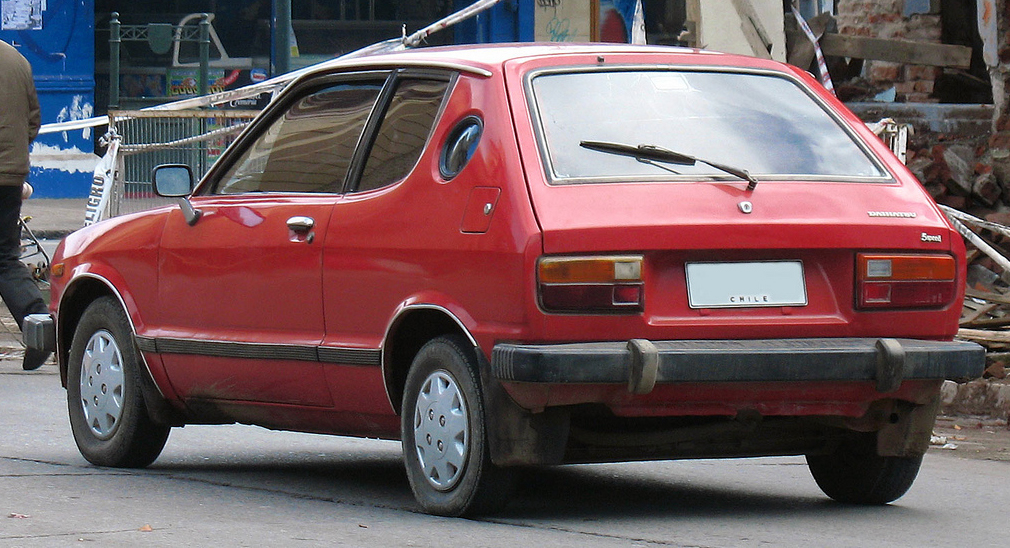
1980–1983 Daihatsu Charade Runabout 3-door (G10)

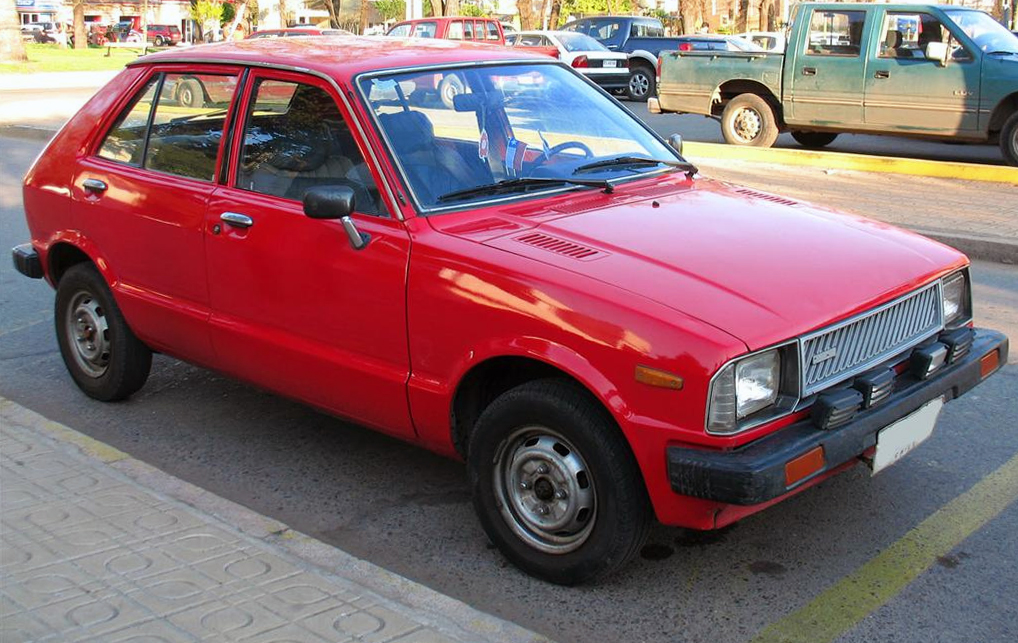
1980–1983 Daihatsu Charade 5-door (G20)

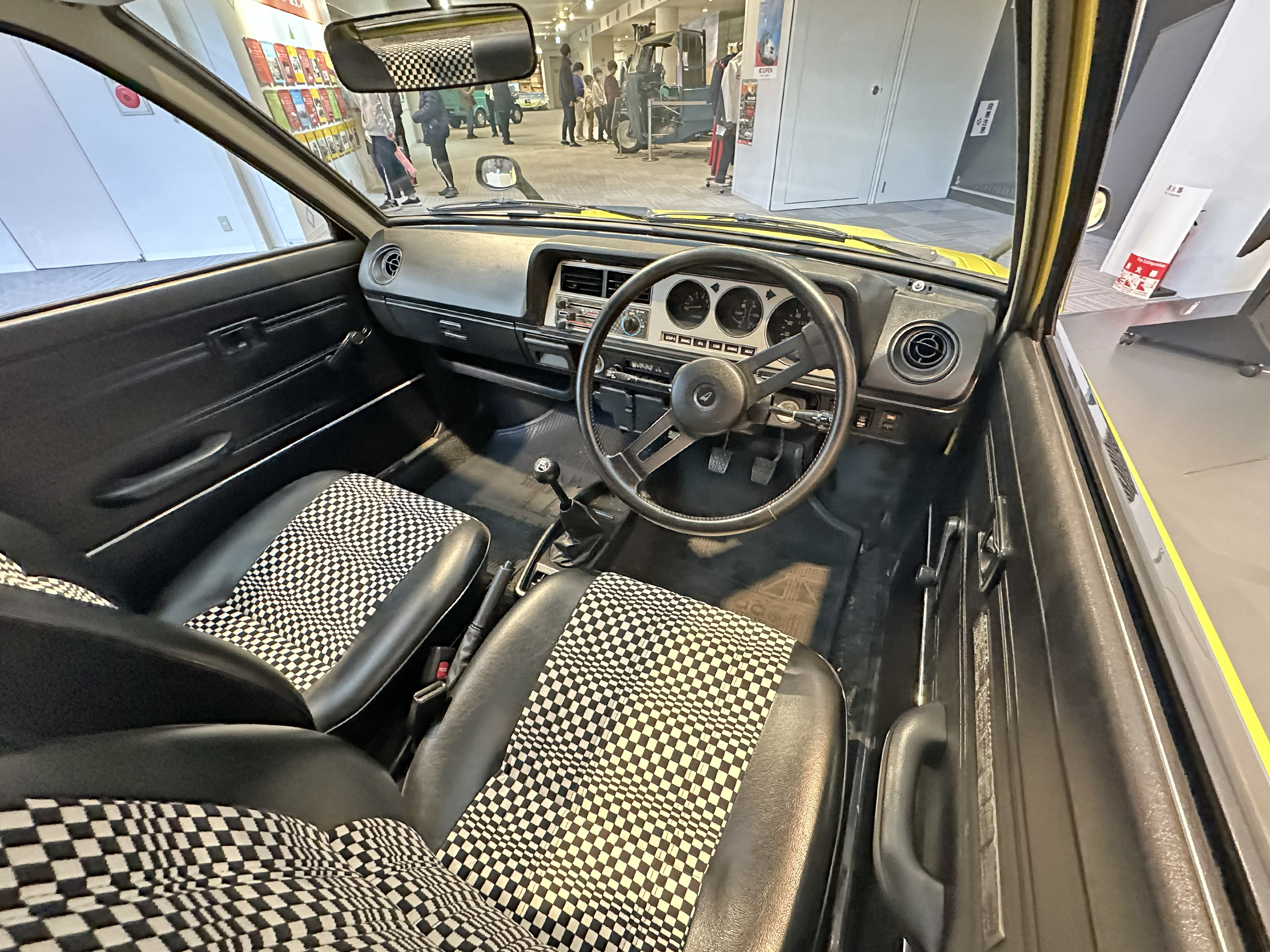
Interior

=== Greece ===
The Greek Automeccanica company, founded in 1979, developed an off-road style torpedo design version of the Charade à la the Citroën Méhari. With a metal body, the "Daihatsu Zebra" used Daihatsu mechanicals, grille and headlights, and many other Daihatsu parts. Production began in 1981 and continued until 1985, by which point changing Greek tax laws meant that this "fun car" could no longer be registered as a commercial vehicle and the market evaporated. The very first cars used the Series 1 round headlights; these were changed to the square Series 2 units before the first year of production had ended. Automeccanica also assembled regular Charades.

=== Competition ===
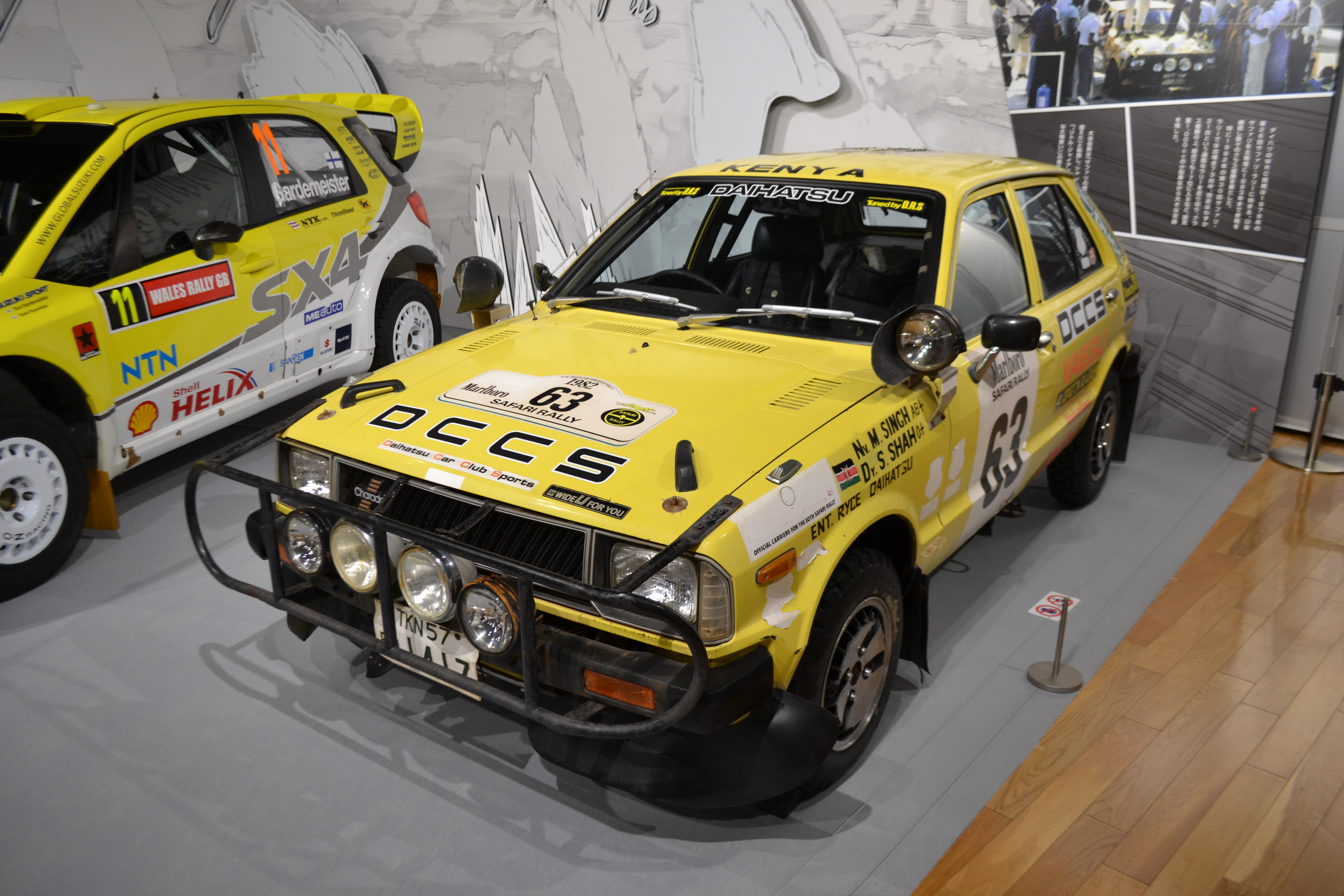
1982 Daihatsu Charade XT rally car

In 1979, two G10 Charades competed in the 2400-kilometre Tour of Malaysia Rally and finished first and second. The G10 continued its competitiveness by winning the 2/1 class at 1981 Monte Carlo Rally while finishing 28th overall (out of 263 participants). They also won their class at the 1982 Safari Rally, where they finished 17th out of 72 starting cars.

Uruguayan driver Guillermo Viera driving his Daihatsu Charade G10 with his brother Agustín Viera as copilot, had competed several times in the 19 Capitals Historic Rally of Uruguay. In 2011 they finished 41st in the overall rank, in 2012 they finished 18th, in 2014 they finished 9th, and in 2016 they finished second overall with a tight final difference with the winners of only two hundredths of a second after nearly 50 hours of competition. They were ranked seventh overall and first in its class at the 500 miles rally of Entre Ríos in 2011. They went on to win Category A in the Uruguayan Championship of Historical Tourism in 2013.

== Second generation (G11/21/26/30; 1983–1988) ==
Second generation (G11/21/26/30)
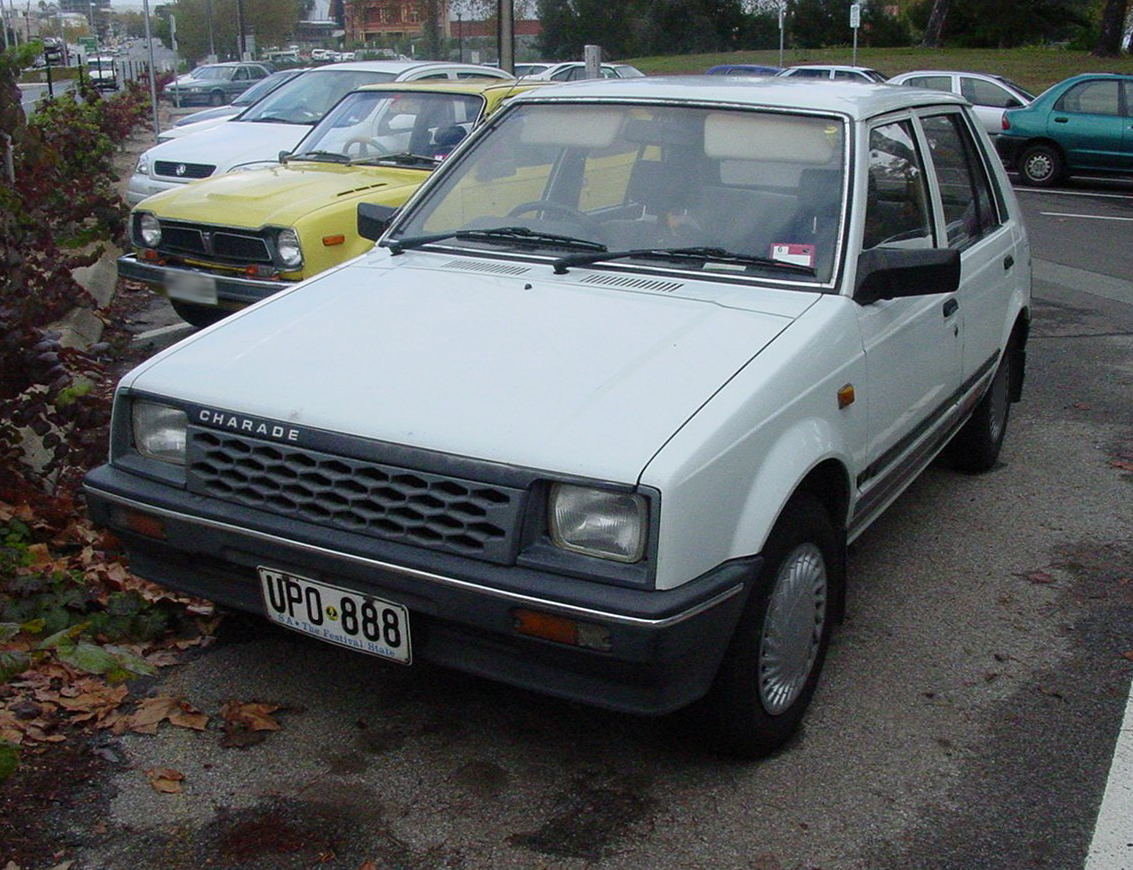
- 1983–1985 Daihatsu Charade CS 5-door (Australia; with honeycomb grille)

Overview
- Also called: Daihatsu Charade Duet (van, Australia); Daihatsu Skywing (notchback, Taiwan); Tianjin Xiali TJ730 (China)
- Production: 1983–1986 (Japan); 1983–1985 (South Africa); 1983–1987 (Indonesia – CKD); 1984–1989 (Taiwan); 1986–1988 (China – CKD)
- Assembly: Japan: Ikeda, Osaka; Indonesia: Sunter, Jakarta (PT. Daihatsu Indonesia); China: Tianjin (Tianjin FAW); South Africa: Sandton, Johannesburg; Taiwan: Dacun, Changhua County (Yu Tian); New Zealand: Otahuhu (Motor Holdings under contract); Malaysia: Shah Alam, Selangor (AMIM)

Body and chassis
- Body style: 3/5-door hatchback; 3-door panel van; 5-door notchback (Skywing)
- Layout: Front-engine, front-wheel-drive; Rear mid-engine, rear-wheel-drive (926R De Tomaso)
- Related: Innocenti Minitre

Powertrain
- Engine: Petrol: 843 cc CD I3 (G21; South America); 926 cc CE SOHC 6-valve turbo I3 (G26 926 Turbo); 926 cc CE DOHC 12-valve turbo I3 (G26 926R De Tomaso); 993 cc CB12/20/22/33/34/35 I3 (G11); 993 cc CB50/60 turbo I3 (G11 Charade Turbo/De Tomaso); Diesel: 993 cc CL10 diesel I3 (G30); 993 cc CL50/60 turbo-diesel I3 (G30)
- Transmission: 4-speed manual; 5-speed manual; 2-speed Daimatic automatic

Dimensions
- Wheelbase: 2,320 mm (91.3 in)
- Length: 3,550 mm (139.8 in) (pre-facelift); 3,595 mm (141.5 in) (post-facelift); 3,600 mm (141.7 in) (pre-facelift De Tomaso); 3,636 mm (143.1 in) (post-facelift De Tomaso); 3,785 mm (149.0 in) (Skywing); 3,850 mm (151.6 in) (926R De Tomaso)
- Width: 1,550 mm (61.0 in); 1,575 mm (62.0 in) (De Tomaso); 1,640 mm (64.6 in) (926R De Tomaso)
- Height: 1,360 mm (53.5 in) (926R De Tomaso); 1,390 mm (54.7 in) (De Tomaso); 1,400 mm (55.1 in); 1,435 mm (56.5 in) (high roof)
- Curb weight: 640–740 kg (1,411.0–1,631.4 lb); 800 kg (1,763.7 lb) (926R De Tomaso)

The second generation (G11) was released in March 1983, again as a three- or a five-door hatchback. It featured several new variations of the three-cylinder 1.0-litre engines, including a turbocharged version and naturally aspirated diesel or turbodiesel engines. The new 1.0-litre diesel engine "CL" was tested on 1 September 1983. To demonstrate the reliability of the new diesel engine, a Charade thus equipped was taken for 10 non-stop laps around the Japanese archipelago; the run lasted 117 days.

The turbo diesel first appeared in the fall of 1984. The base Charades received the naturally aspirated, three cylinder, 993 cc CB-series (Note: CB12/33/34/35 for Japanese market, CB22 for Japanese and Taiwanese markets and CB20 for export markets.) engines with 52–60 PS (38–44 kW; 51–59 bhp). 0–62 mph (0–100 km/h) takes around 15–17 seconds. Japanese market models had twin carburettors as standard, while most export versions received a single unit which made marginally less power. This generation has drag coefficient of Cd=0.36.

In Chile (and some other Latin American countries) this generation was called the G21, and like the G20 before it, it was equipped with the smaller 41 PS (30 kW; 40 bhp) 843 cc three-cylinder "CD" engine. The G21 was sold between 1985 and 1990 approximately.

The Charade Turbo and Charade De Tomaso models had the upgraded 1.0-litre "CB" series engine, called the CB50 and CB60. The CB50 was fitted with a very small IHI turbocharger, which increased its power to 80 PS (59 kW; 79 bhp) (JIS) in Japanese market cars or CB60 producing 68 PS (50 kW; 67 bhp) (DIN) in European export models. The tiny turbocharger meant that an intercooler was not necessary. The suspension was lightly upgraded, with thicker anti-roll bars and slightly stiffer suspension, and the car also received alloy wheels rather than the standard steel items.

The turbo version was available in both bodystyles. Singaporean-market Charades received the same 60 and 80 PS (44 and 59 kW; 59 and 79 bhp) (JIS) engines as used in Japan. The Indonesian-built 5-door Charades (CKD and still labelled with Japanese "J" code on the VIN instead of Indonesian "MF-MK" VIN code) also received the same engines as its neighbor, the turbo model appeared in July 1986 and also the first turbo car to go on sale in the country.

There were high roofed versions available in some markets, either with the three- or five-door bodywork. This was called the "Dolphin Roof" in Japan. The three-door model was also available in a Van model for commercial use, offered with the naturally aspirated diesel or petrol engines and fitted with the higher roof. Depending on market requirements, the Charade Van was also available with blanked rear windows. To escape quotas and some of the ADR strictures, the high-roof van version was sold in Australia as the Daihatsu Charade Duet in parallel with the passenger models.

The G11 was produced with two front end treatments: with square headlights (Series 1) and with rectangular "cat's eye" shaped headlights (Series 2). The facelift was first presented in the summer of 1985. In Europe, the G11 underbody and various engines and transmissions also formed the basis for the Innocenti Minitre after Innocenti's contract with British Leyland expired. The G11 underpinnings continued to be used by the Italian automaker until 1992. Aside from four- and five-speed manuals a two-speed automatic option called the "Daimatic" was also available.

In Australia the range began with the high roofed two-seater, three-door CC model, while the rest of the range (CS, CX, CX-A, and turbo CX-T) had five-door bodywork.

Taiwanese assembly began in 1983 or 1984. In 1987 they also presented a locally developed longer notchback version of the five-door, similar to the Subaru Tutto and Nissan March Cubic, sold as the Daihatsu Skywing. Developing a model locally also gained the assembler a three percent tax subsidy. In New Zealand, the naturally aspirated petrol model was assembled locally at General Motors' plant in Trentham. The Turbo was also sold there, imported fully built-up.

For China, the G11 Charade was known as the Tianjin TJ730 as a CKD from 1986 to 1988. It was then replaced by the popular G100 Charade.

In South Africa, Alfa Romeo's local subsidiary assembled Daihatsu Charades beginning in March 1983. The only model available was the naturally aspirated petrol 1.0, with five doors and the high roof. Power is 60 PS (44 kW; 59 bhp), and either a four- or five-speed manual transmission was available. These Charades were also exported to Italy to circumvent Italian laws hindering the import of Japanese cars. South African assembly ended in late 1985, when Alfa Romeo closed down their South African subsidiary. The Charade represented nearly half of Alfa Romeo's South African production in 1985.

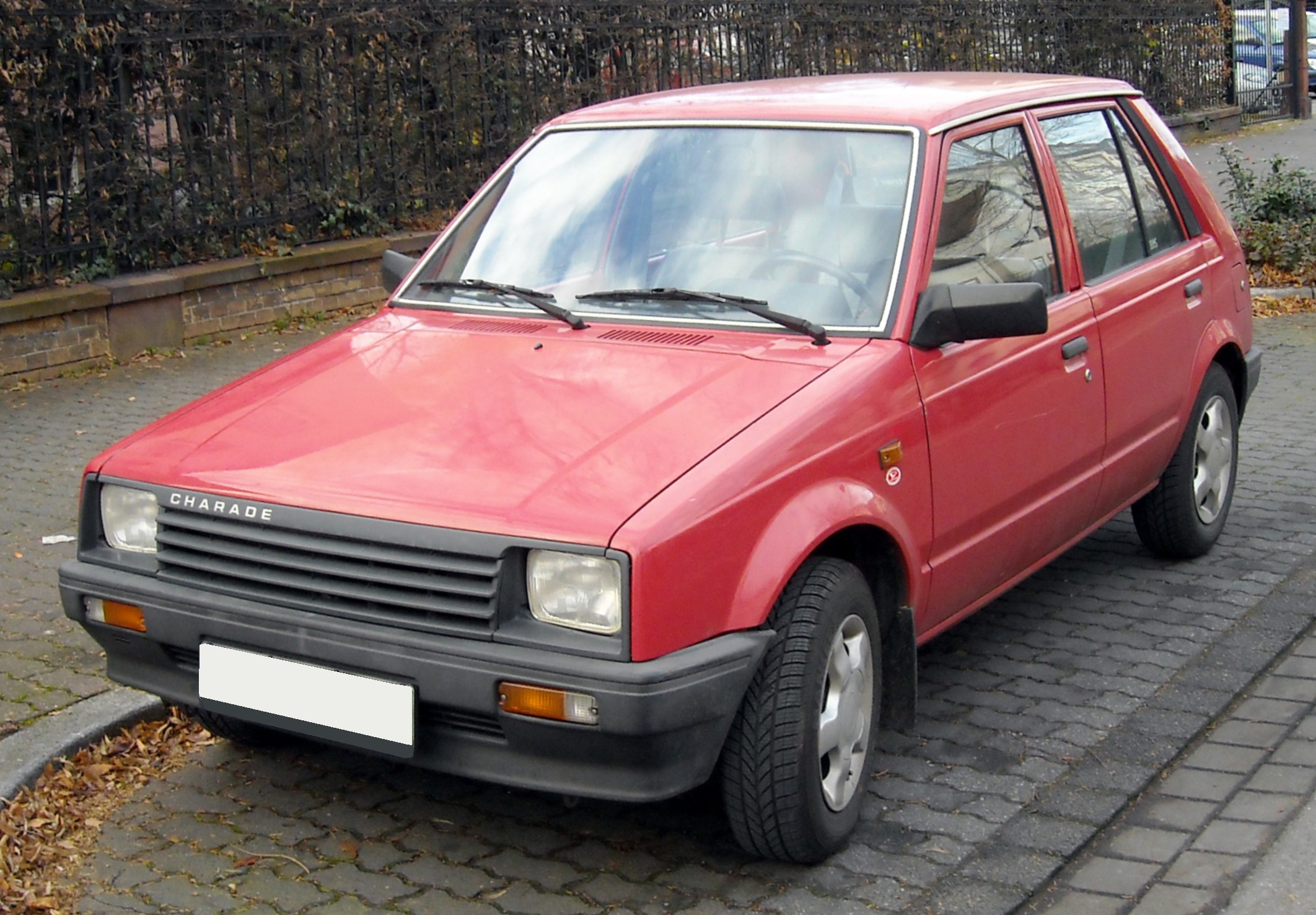
1983–1985 Daihatsu Charade CS 5-door (Europe; with slat grille)

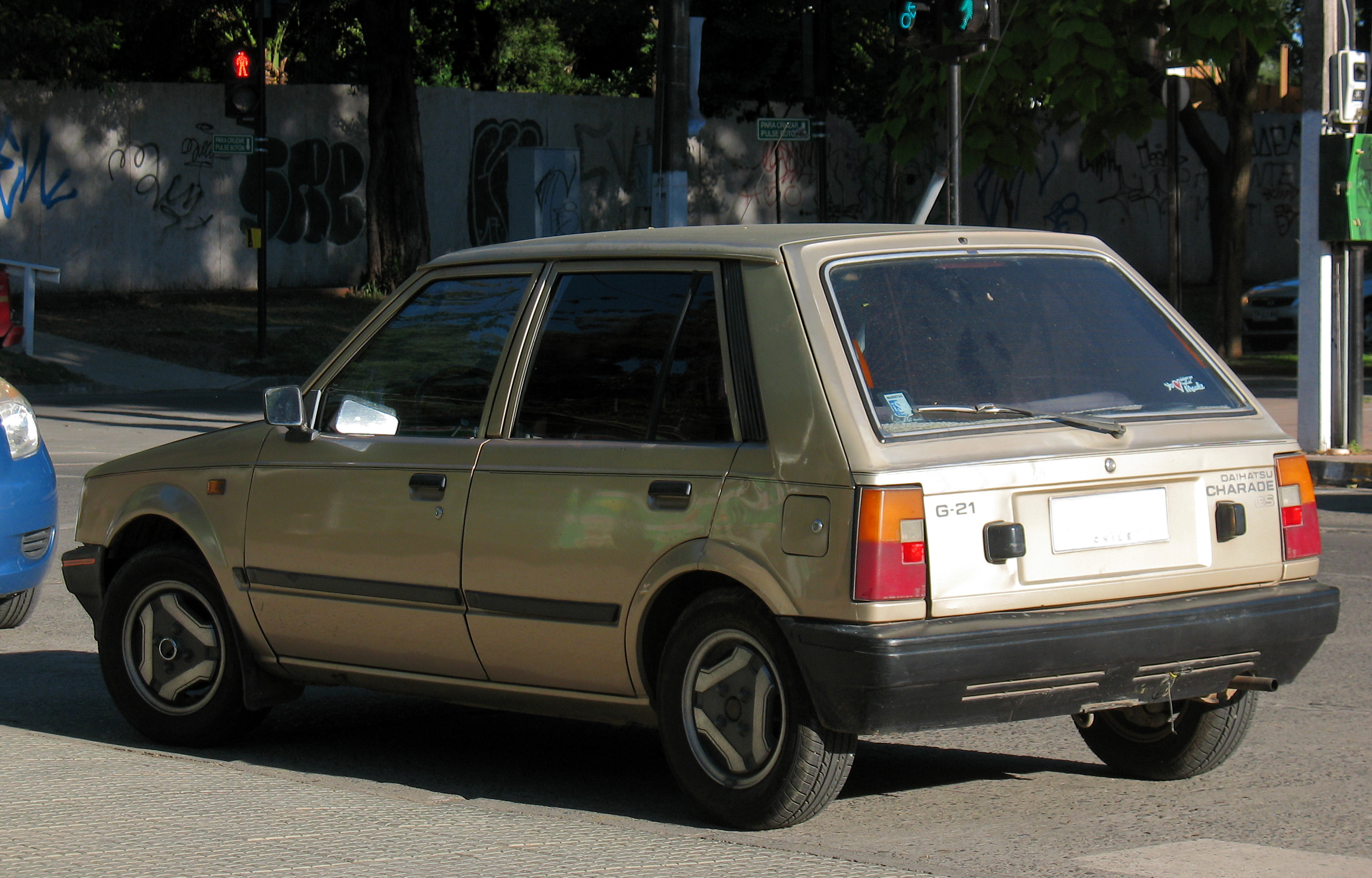
1983–1985 Daihatsu Charade CS G21 5-door (Chile)

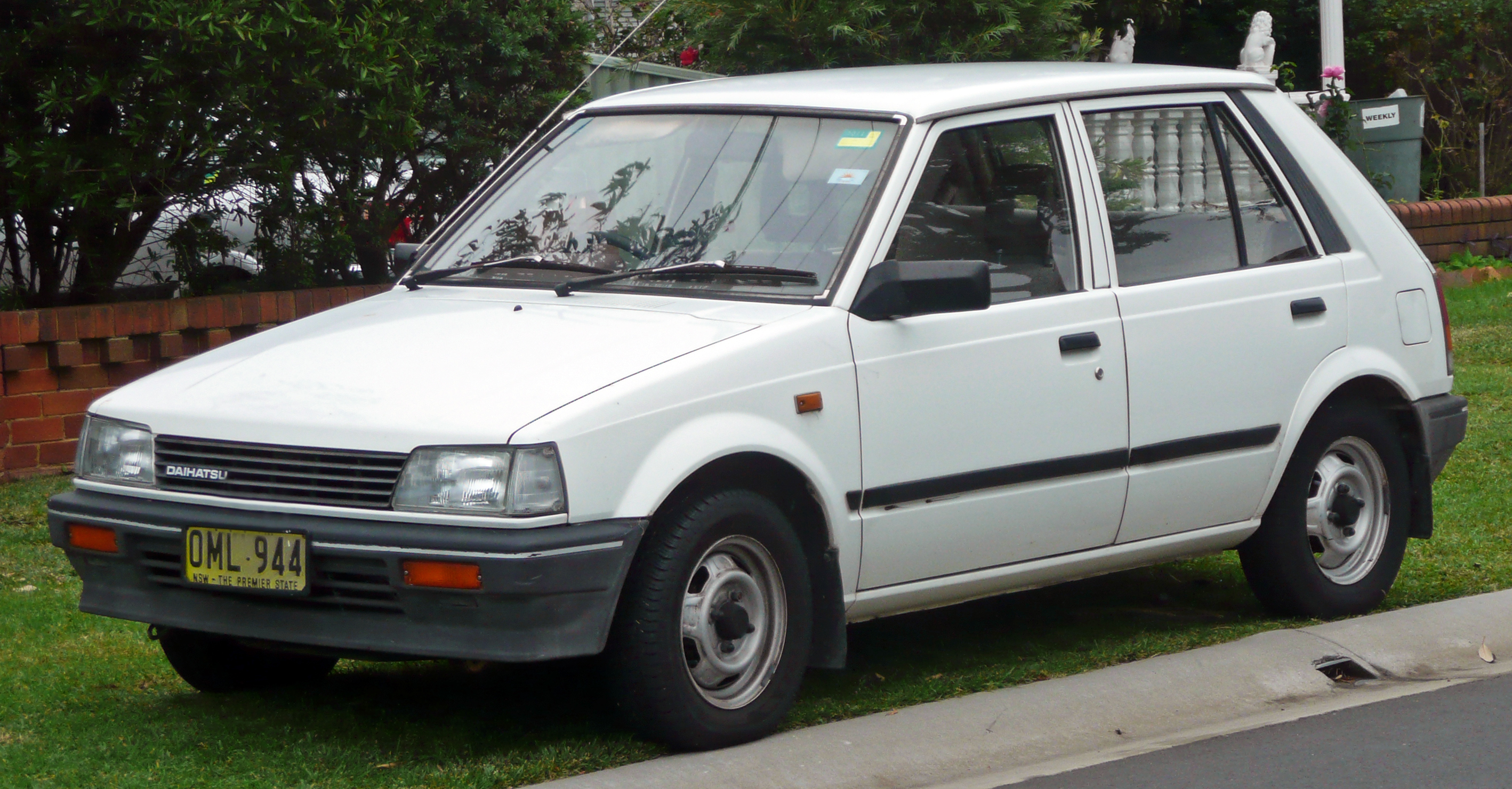
1985–1987 Daihatsu Charade CX 5-door (Australia)

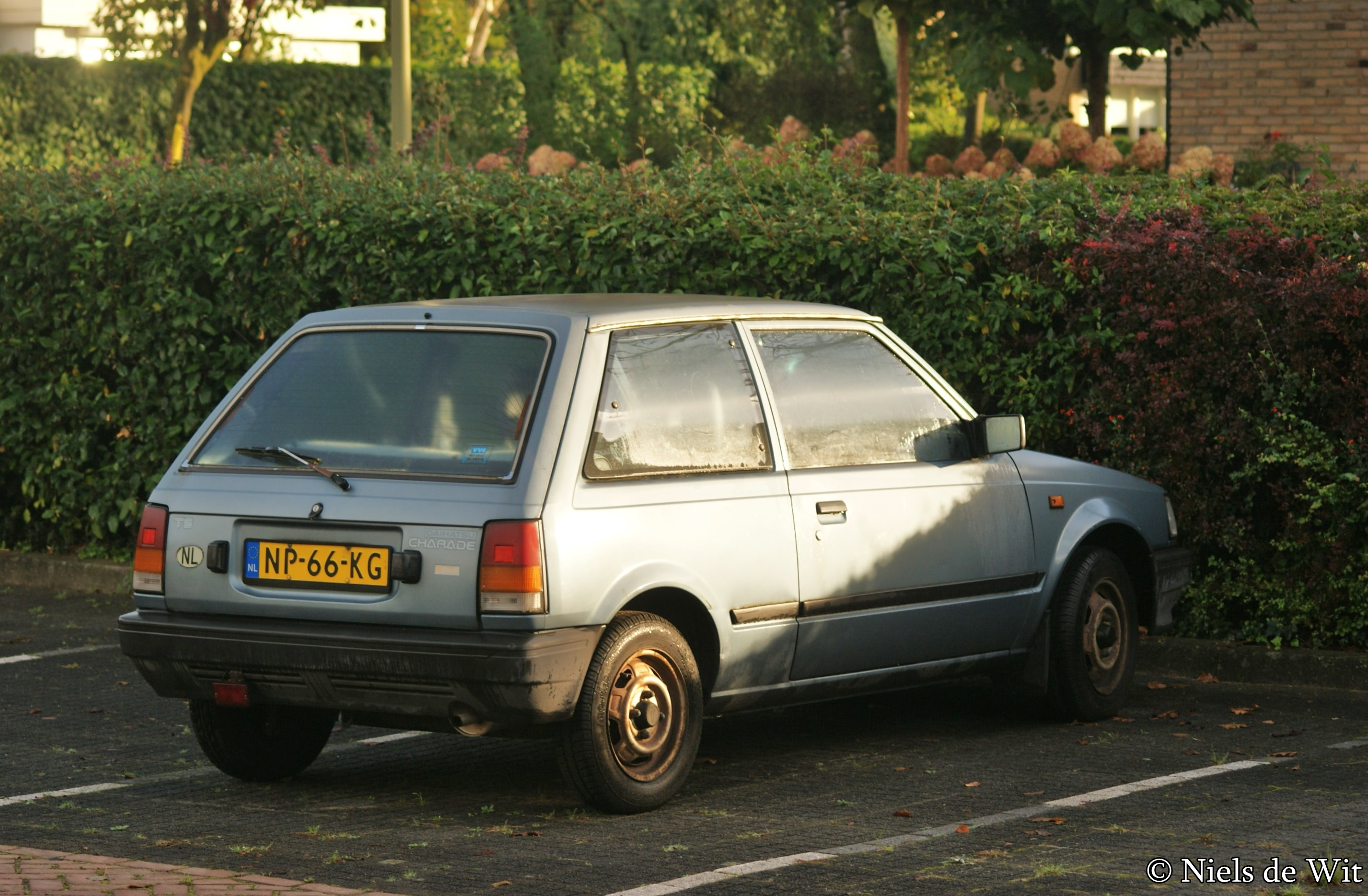
1985–1987 Daihatsu Charade TS Daimatic 3-door (Europe)

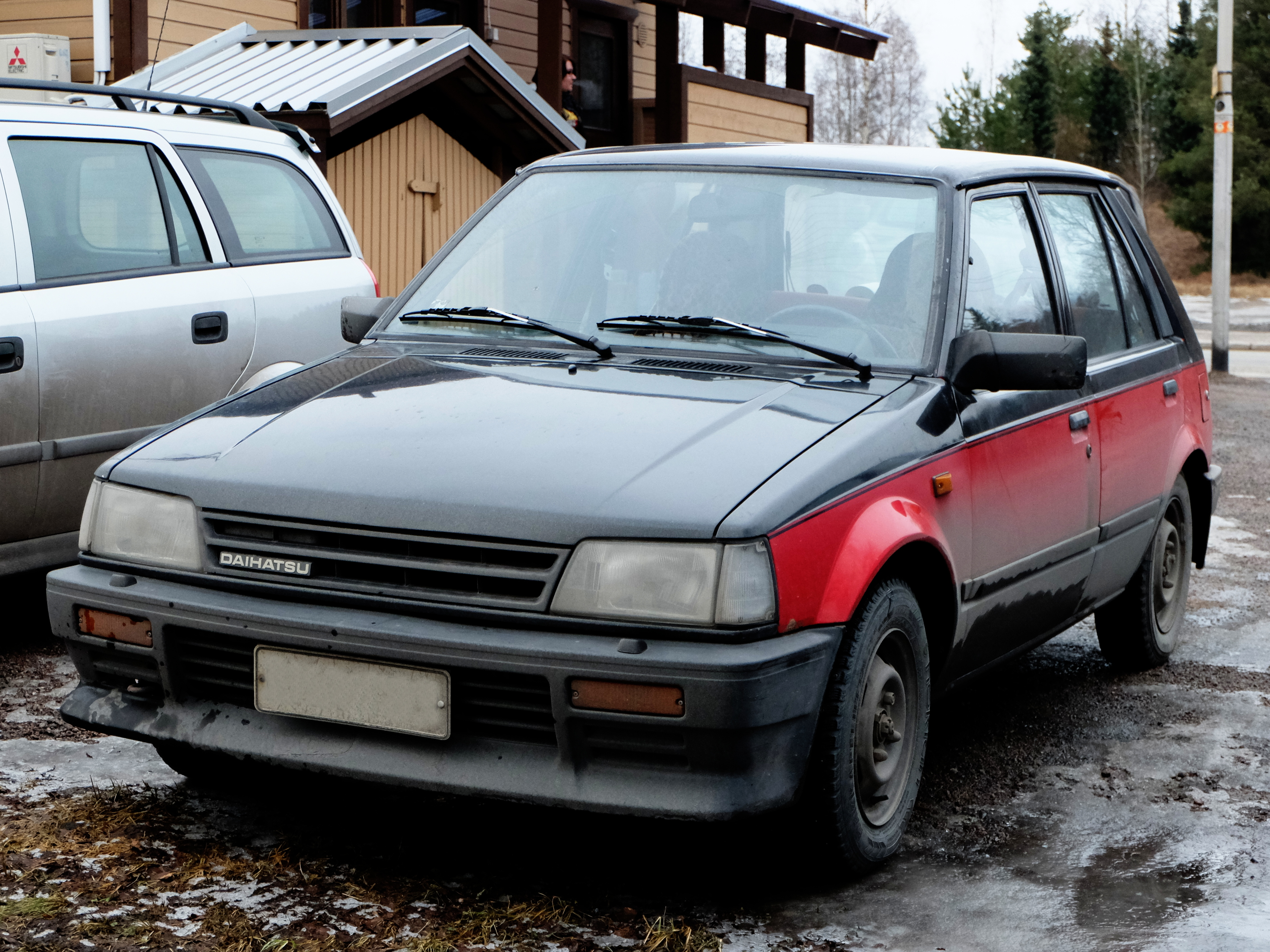
1985–1987 Daihatsu Charade Turbo 5-door (Europe)

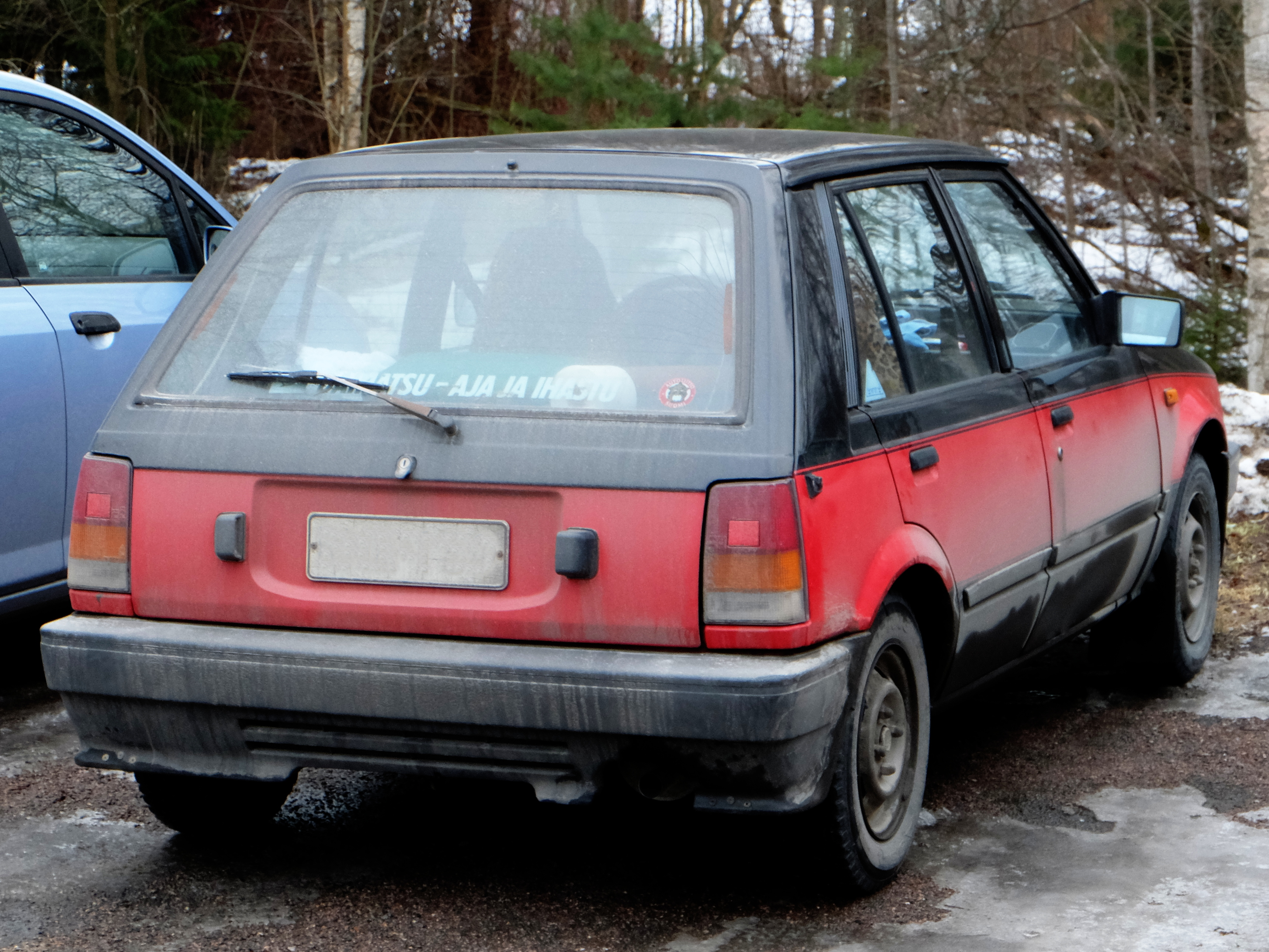
Rear view

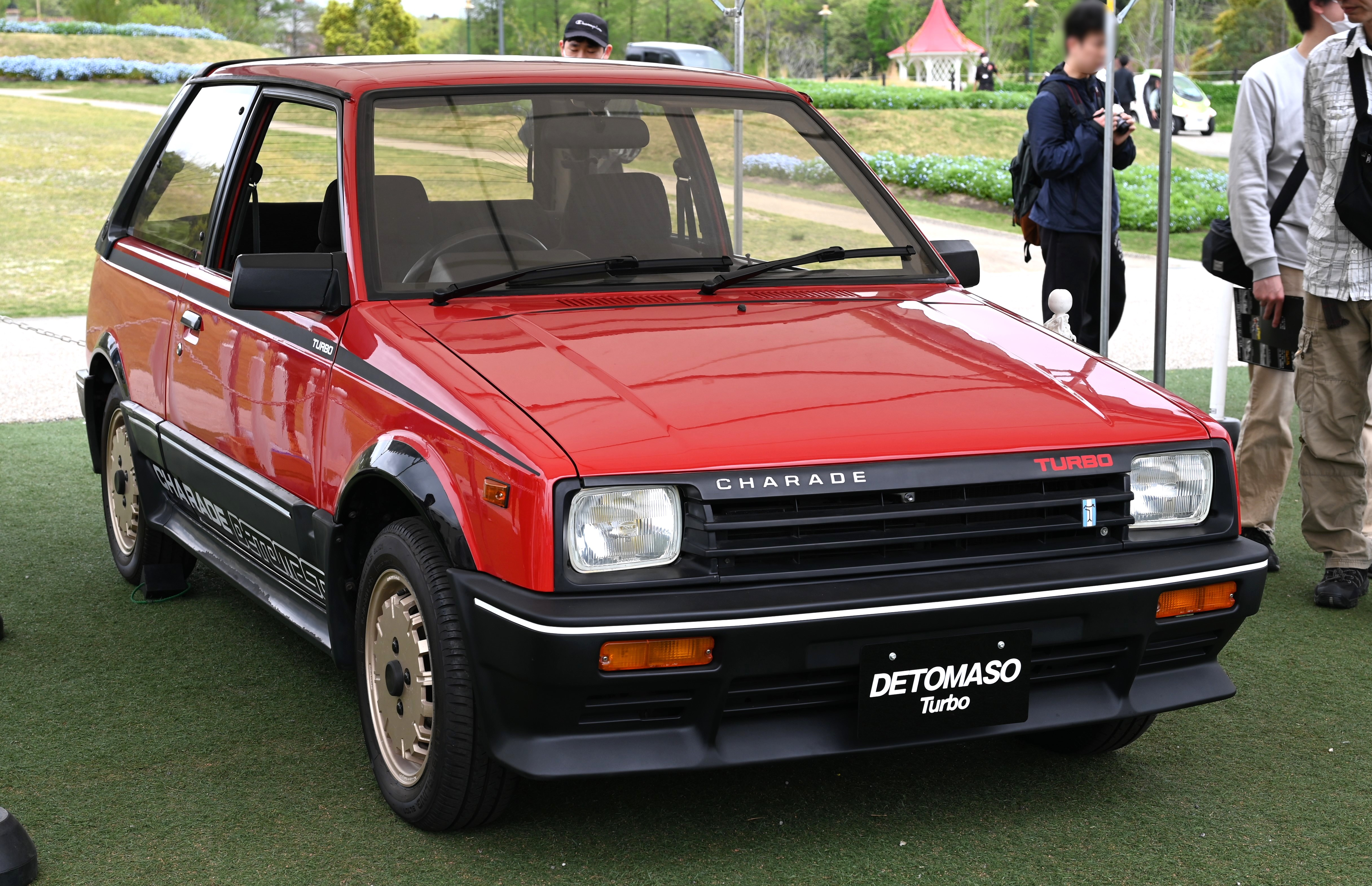
1984 Daihatsu Charade De Tomaso Turbo

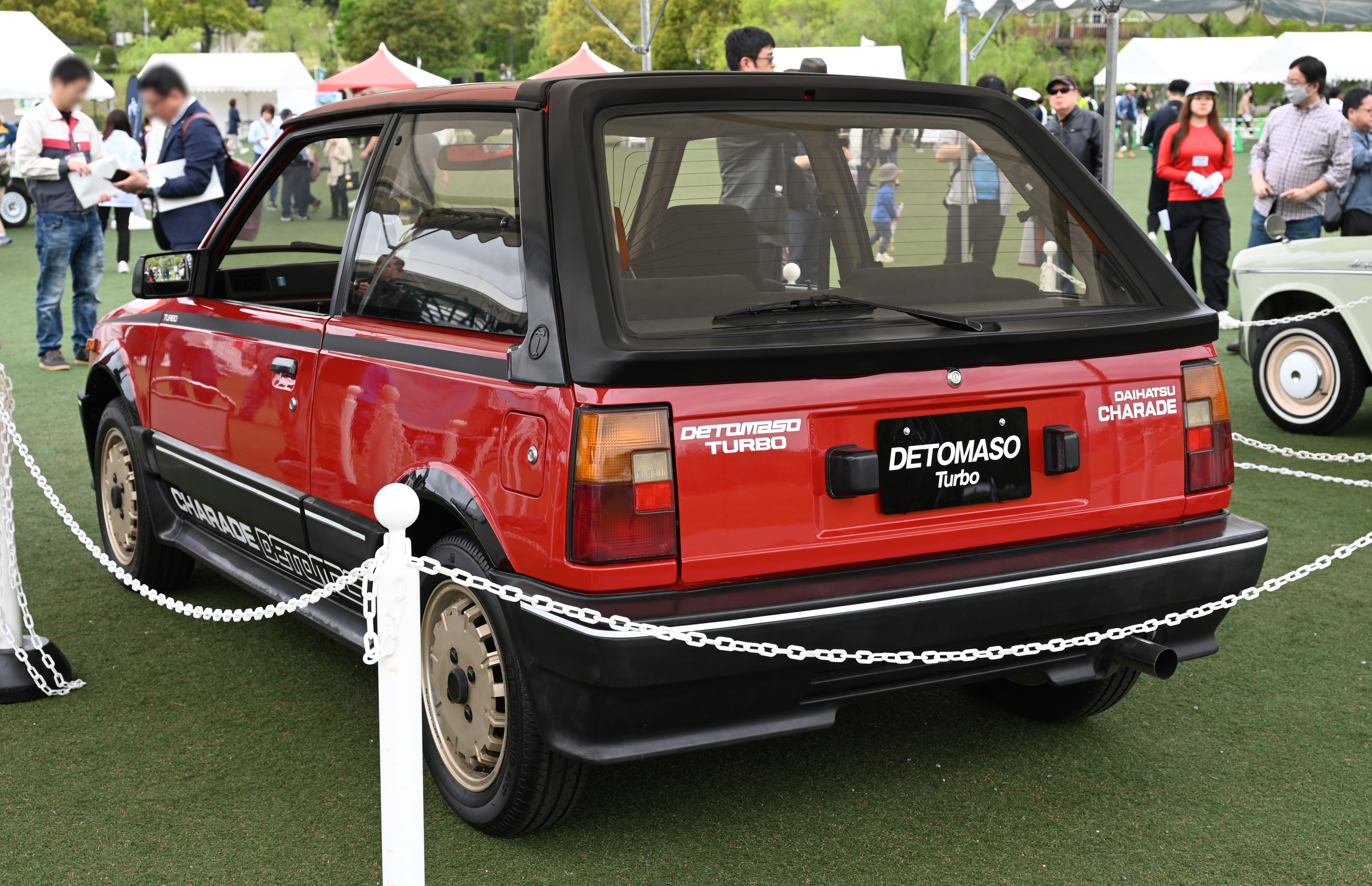
1984 Charade De Tomaso Turbo rear view

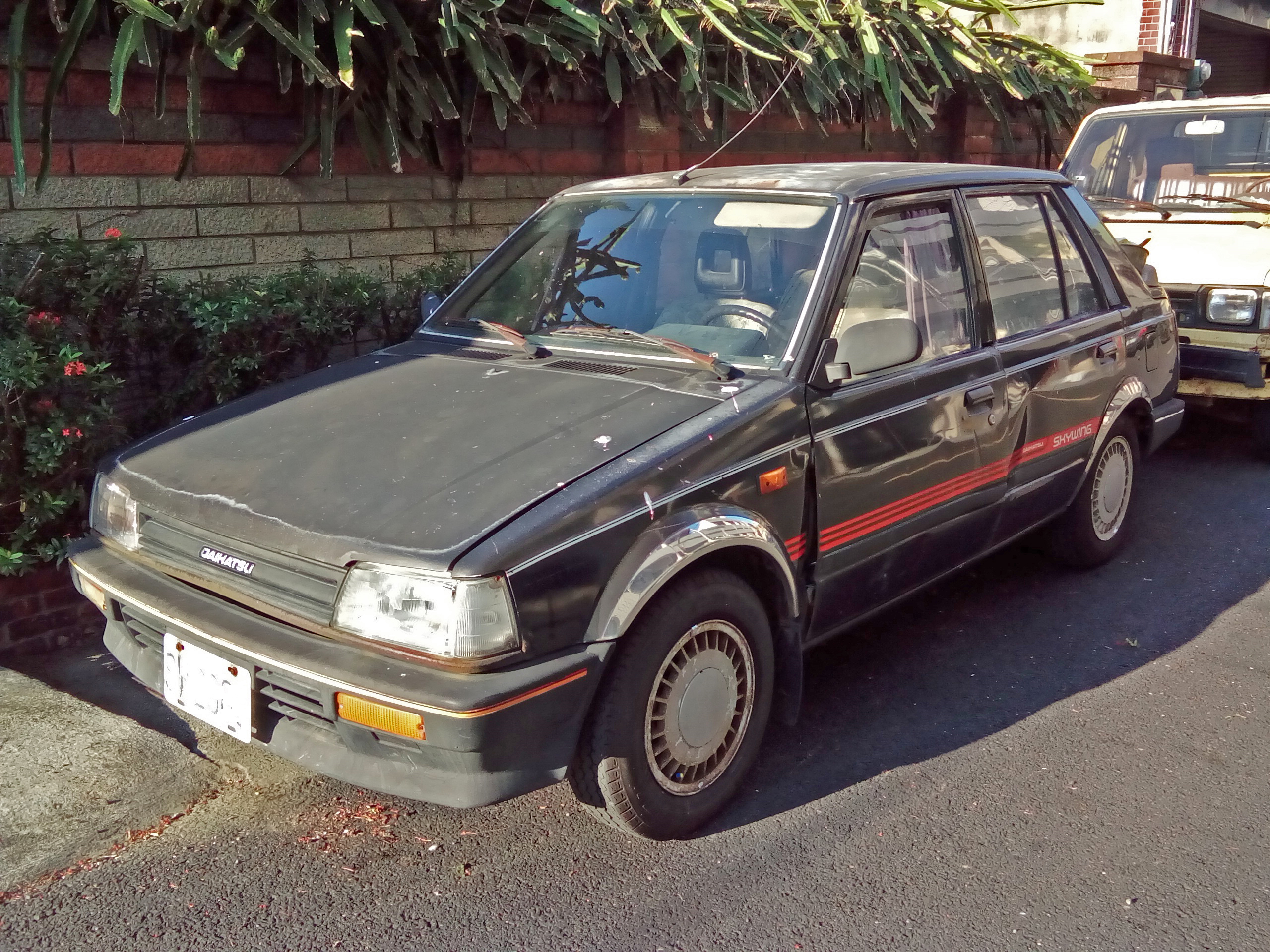
Daihatsu Skywing CDS‧II 5-door (Taiwan; notchback)

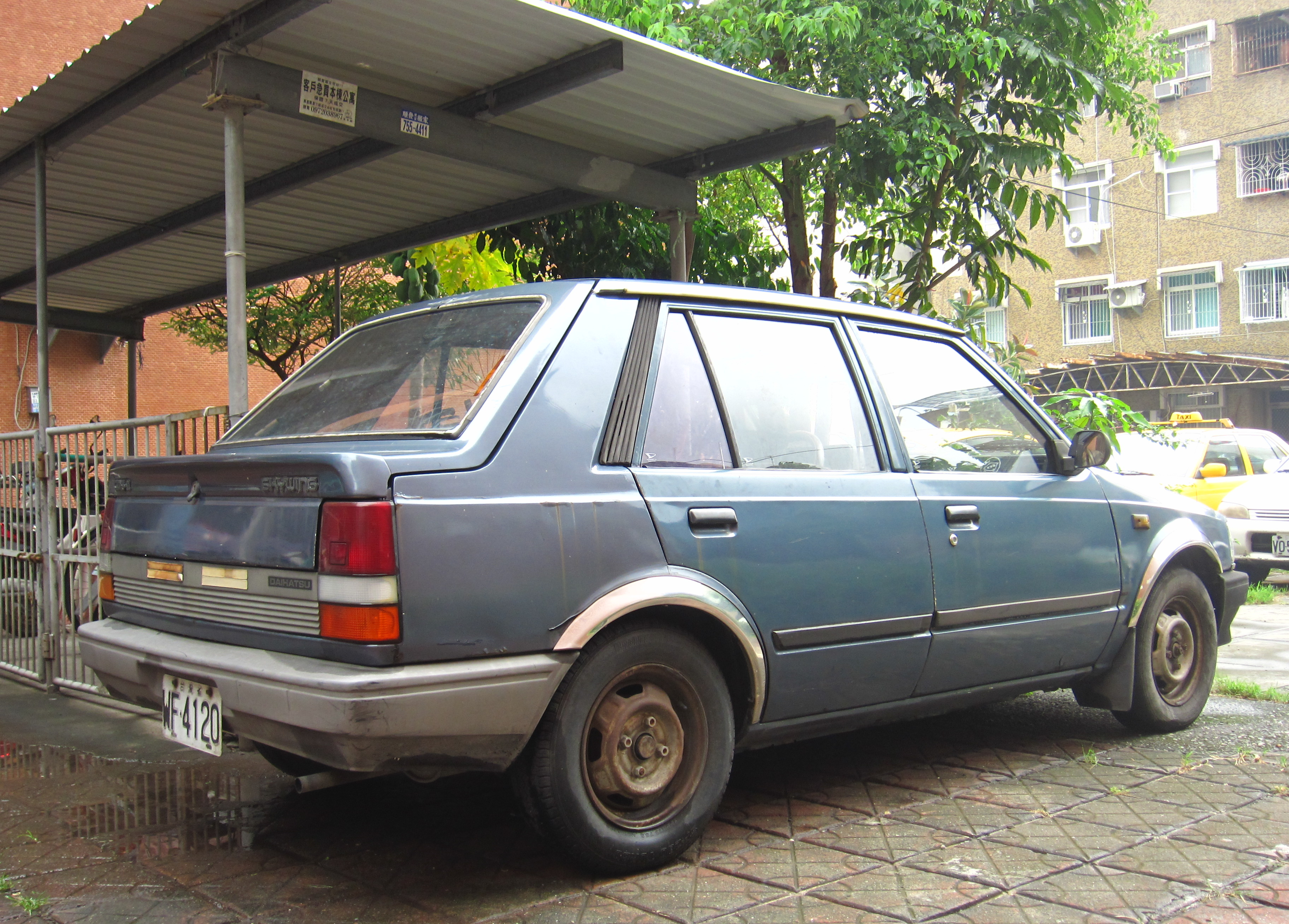
Rear view of Skywing

=== Charade 926 Turbo ===
In October 1985, at the 26th Tokyo Motor Show, Daihatsu introduced the 926R, a prototype of a mid engine Charade, developed together with De Tomaso and designed to take part in the World Rally Championship for cars under 1,300 cc. With a 1.4 equivalence factor for forced induction engines, this meant that the downsized engine was classified as being of 1296.4 cc. The 926R had a mid-mounted 926 cc twelve valve, twin-cam, turbocharged three-cylinder "CE" engine, moving the rear wheels through a five-speed manual transmission and delivering 120 PS (88 kW; 118 bhp).

The 926R weighed 800 kg (1,764 lb) and had wider fenders to cover the 205/225 15" wheels. However, following significant crashes in the 1985 championship, Group B was banned and the 926R project was called off. Previously, There was also a limited homologation series of 200 units Charade 926 Turbo launched in October 1984, equipped with the SOHC 6-valve version of the 926 cc engine and producing 76 PS (56 kW; 75 bhp).

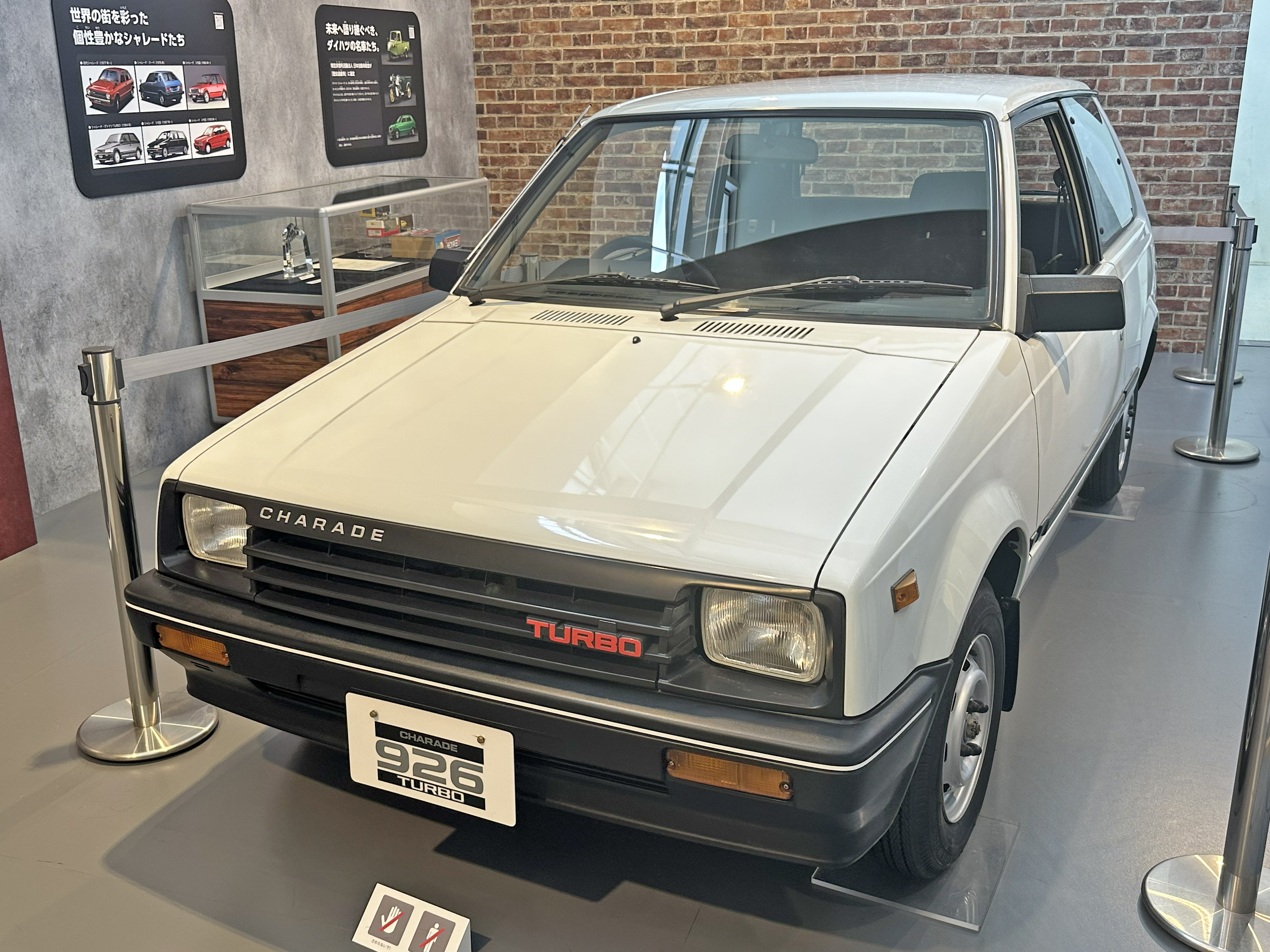
1984 Daihatsu Charade 926 Turbo

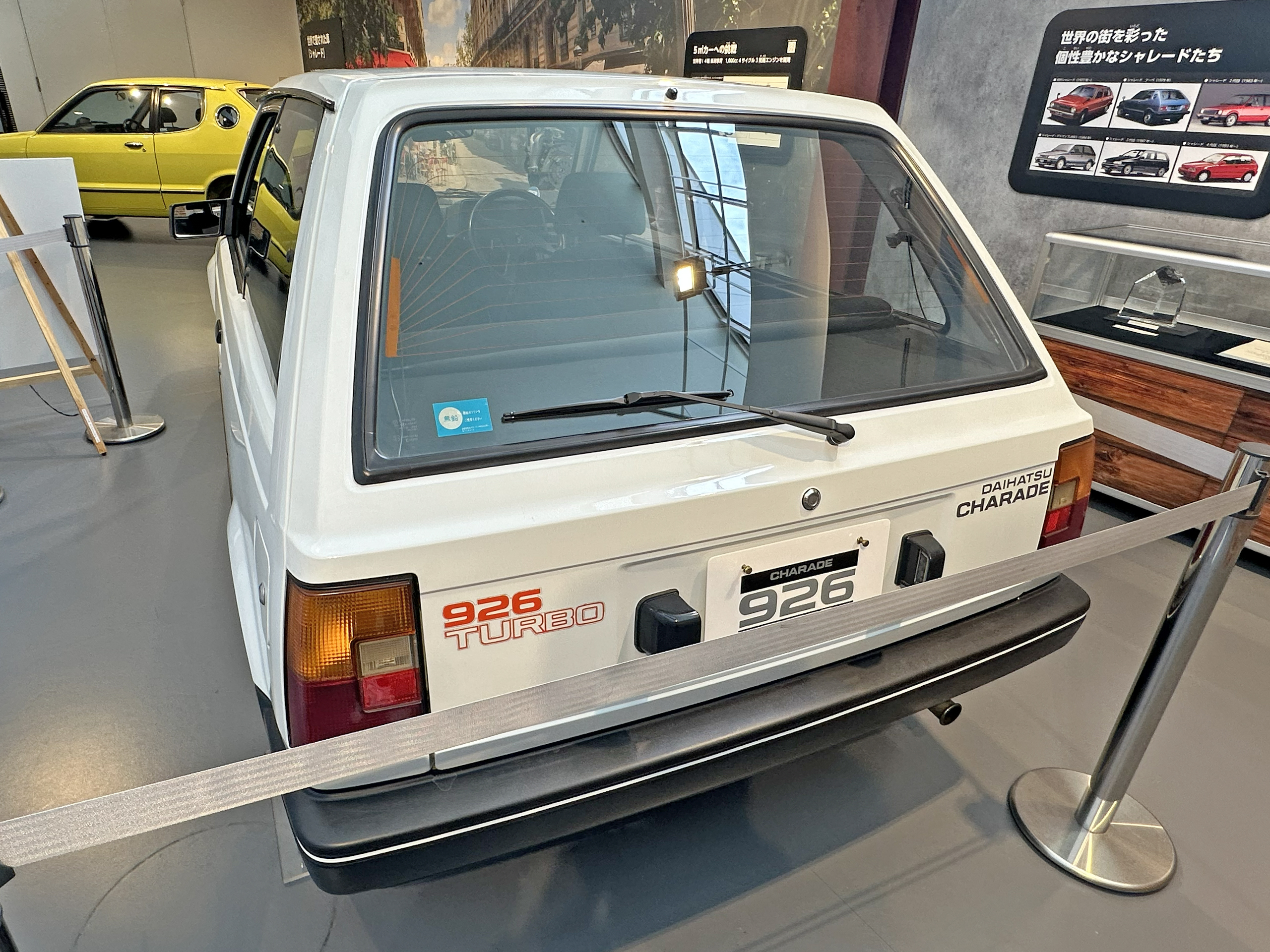
1984 Daihatsu Charade 926 Turbo (rear view)

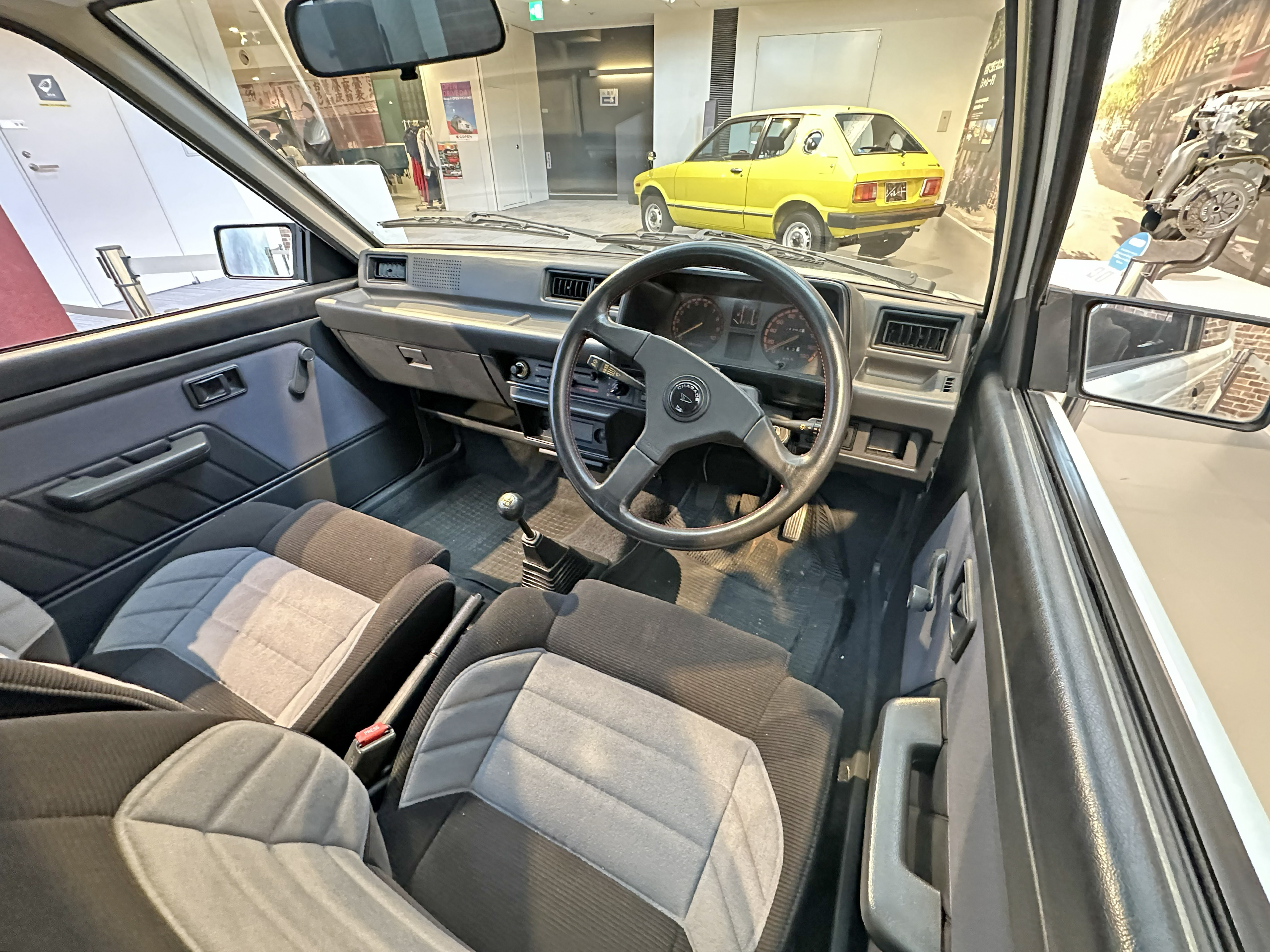
Charade Interior

=== Competition ===
The second generation Daihatsu Charade did see some rally usage. Charades (both Turbos and normally aspirated cars) were entered in the 1984 through 1988 Safari Rallys. They won the A5 class and runner-up in A6 class in 1984. In 1985 they won both A3 and B5 categories. The Charades were finished at 13th, 14th and 19th overall out of 71 contestants, impressive for the little car. In 1986 and 1987 the Charades won the A5 class. The Swiss Daihatsu importer campaigned a Charade Turbo in their national Group A rally championship in 1985, with Florence L'Huillier as a driver.

== Third generation (G100; 1987–1993) ==
Third generation (G100/101/102/112)
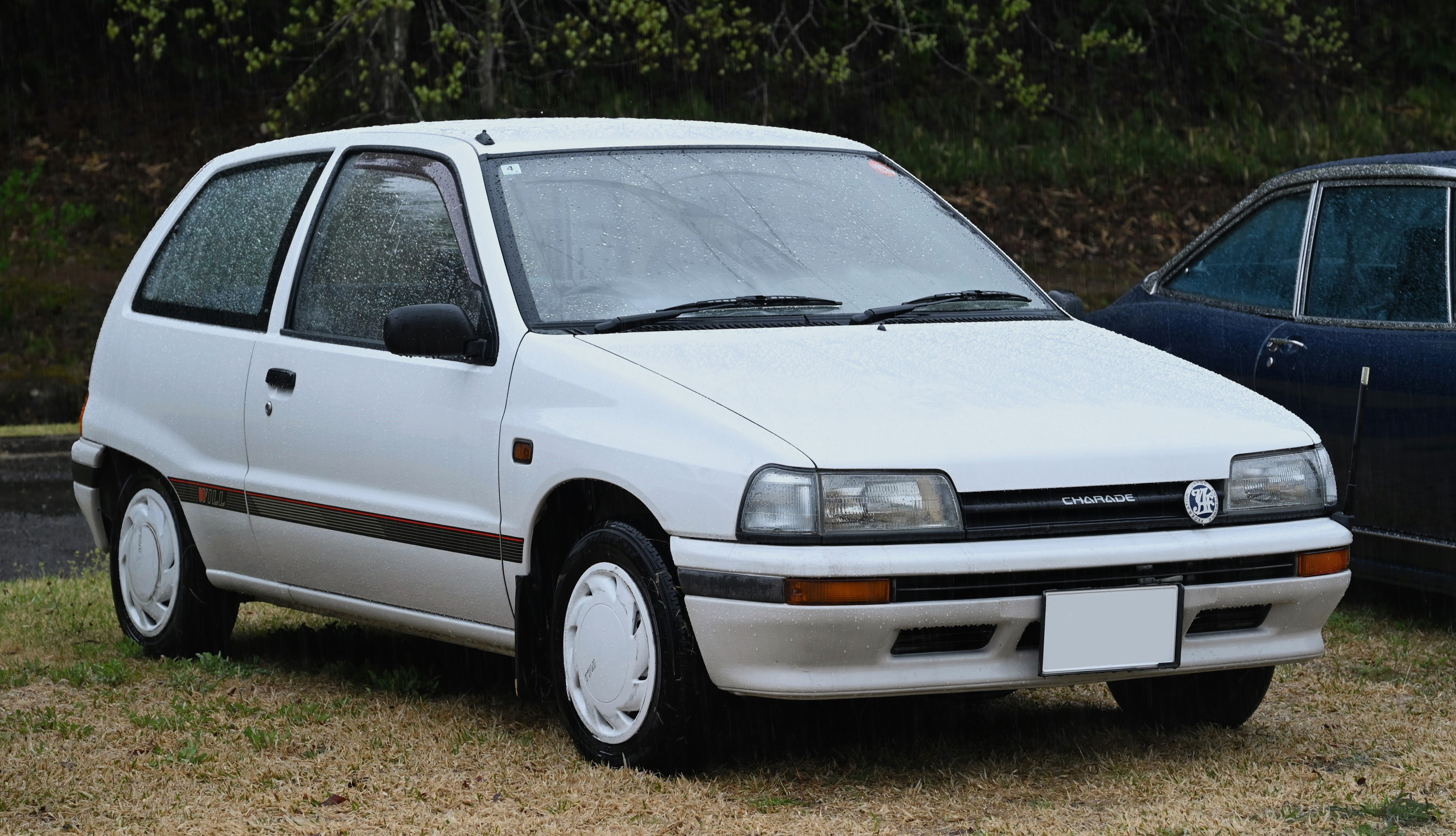
- 1987–1989 Daihatsu Charade 3-door (Japan)

Overview
- Also called: Daihatsu Charade Social (sedan; Japan); Daihatsu Classy (sedan; Indonesia); Daihatsu Winner (1.3 L hatchback; Indonesia); Daihatsu Social (sedan; Taiwan); Tianjin Xiali (China); 大发夏利 (Chinese translation of Daihatsu Charade)
- Production: 1986–1994 (Japan); 1987–1998 (Indonesia); 1988–2012 (China); 1989–1996 (Taiwan)
- Assembly: Japan: Ikeda, Osaka; Indonesia: Sunter, Jakarta (Astra Daihatsu Motor – Sunter Assembly Plant); New Zealand: Nelson (Honda NZ under contract, limited batches until switch to Japanese build); China: Tianjin (Tianjin FAW); Taiwan: Dacun, Changhua County (Yu Tian); Malaysia: Shah Alam, Selangor (AMIM)
- Designer: Hiroshi Aoki and Hideyuki Ueda

Body and chassis
- Body style: 3/5-door hatchback; 3-door panel van (The Netherlands); 4-door sedan
- Layout: Front-engine, front-wheel-drive; Front-engine, four-wheel-drive

Powertrain
- Engine: Petrol: 847 cc ED10 I3 (New Zealand); 993 cc CB23/36/37/90 (Note: CB23 with carburetor for export markets, CB36/37 with electronic carburetor for Japanese market and CB90 with fuel injection for European/North American market.) I3 (G100); 993 cc CB51/61 6-valve SOHC turbo I3 (G100); 993 cc CB70/80 12-valve DOHC turbo I3 (G100); 1295 cc HC-E/F I4 (G102/112); Diesel: 993 cc CL11/30 (Note: CL30 for Japanese market and CL11 for export markets.) I3 (G101, hatchback); 993 cc CL51/61/70 (Note: CL51 for automatic transmission, CL70 for manual transmission and CL61 for export markets.) turbo-diesel I3 (G101, hatchback)
- Transmission: 4 (Note: Base model 1.0-litre (G100) hatchback only) or 5-speed manual transmission; 3-speed Aisin Warner A210 automatic transmission

Dimensions
- Wheelbase: 2,340 mm (92.1 in)
- Length: Hatchback: 3,610–3,680 mm (142.1–144.9 in); Sedan: 3,995 mm (157.3 in)
- Width: 1,600–1,615 mm (63.0–63.6 in)
- Height: 1,385 mm (54.5 in)
- Curb weight: Hatchback: 780–870 kg (1,720–1,918 lb); Sedan: 810–890 kg (1,786–1,962 lb)

The third generation of the Daihatsu Charade (G100) debuted in January 1987. With styling by Daihatsu chief stylist Hiroshi Aoki and colleague Hideyuki Ueda, the more rounded design was able to reach a drag coefficient of Cd=0.32.

It originally shipped with a carbureted or fuel injected naturally aspirated (CB23/36/37/90) and turbocharged (CB51/61) SOHC 6-valve 1.0-litre three-cylinder engines, also available as a diesel and turbodiesel (CL series). In New Zealand, this generation was available with a 32 kW (44 PS; 43 hp) 846 cc ED10 three-cylinder engine. The little 1.0-litre diesel engine continued to be one of the most fuel efficient cars in the world at the time. At a steady 60 km/h (37 mph), a Charade turbodiesel fitted with the five-speed manual transmission was capable of a claimed 2.74 L/100 km (85.9 mpg_{‑US}).

The turbocharged SOHC 6-valve 1.0-litre three-cylinder engine was discontinued in February 1988 (until mid 1989 for several export markets) and replaced with a 1.3-litre four-cylinder with single carburetor or fuel injection (HC-E/F). The four-cylinder was built with lightness in mind, featuring a hollow crankshaft and camshaft, and the weight of a four-cylinder car was no higher than a similarly equipped three-cylinder model.

Featuring fully independent suspension front and rear, either three-door or five-door hatchback body styles were originally offered. There was also a version with permanent four-wheel drive and the fuel injected 1.3-litre engine, called the TXF/CXF/Will (3/5-door, G112 chassis code). This version was also exported to a few countries, for example in Scandinavia and Switzerland.

A 1.0-litre twin-cam fuel injected intercooled turbo (CB70/80), named GTti and delivering 105 PS (104 hp; 77 kW) was later added, only available as a three-door hatch. There were two different sport models available (both with G100S-FMVZ model codes), the GTti and the GT-XX. Both versions are mechanically identical, but the GT-XX features many added luxury items. These include full bodykit, lightweight 14-inch speedline alloys, air-conditioning, power steering, one-touch electric window down, and electric sunroof. Some of these options were also available to buy as optional extras on the GTti. Side-skirts were also fitted to many GTtis, but in some countries they were only sold as a dealer optional extra.

The GT-XX is much rarer than the GTti, mainly being sold in Japan, although some were exported and sold in other countries in small numbers. All GT-XXs have engine code CB70, whereas GTtis can have CB70 or CB80, depending on the country and region sold. There are no known differences with the actual engine internals, all CB70s feature catalyst emissions control systems.

Even some CB80s for Europe featured the catalyst, although UK cars did not. There are more than likely slight differences between the CB70 and CB80 ECU mapping, with CB70 cars quoted as producing 105 PS (104 hp; 77 kW) compared to the CB80's 101 PS (100 hp; 74 kW). This is probably down to the CB70 having the ignition timing mapped more advanced to suit the higher octane fuel used in Japan.

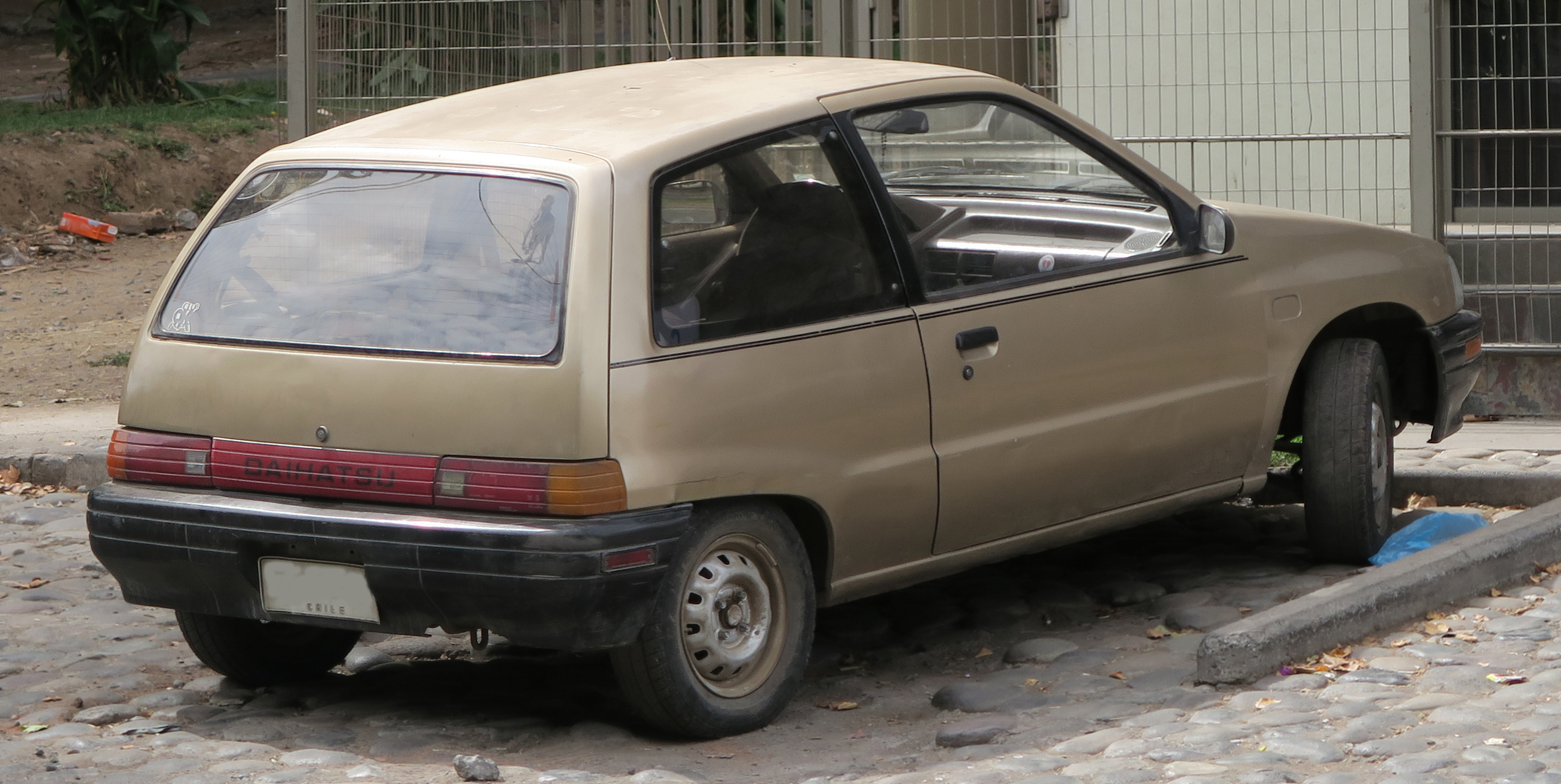
1987–1989 Daihatsu Charade 3-door (US)

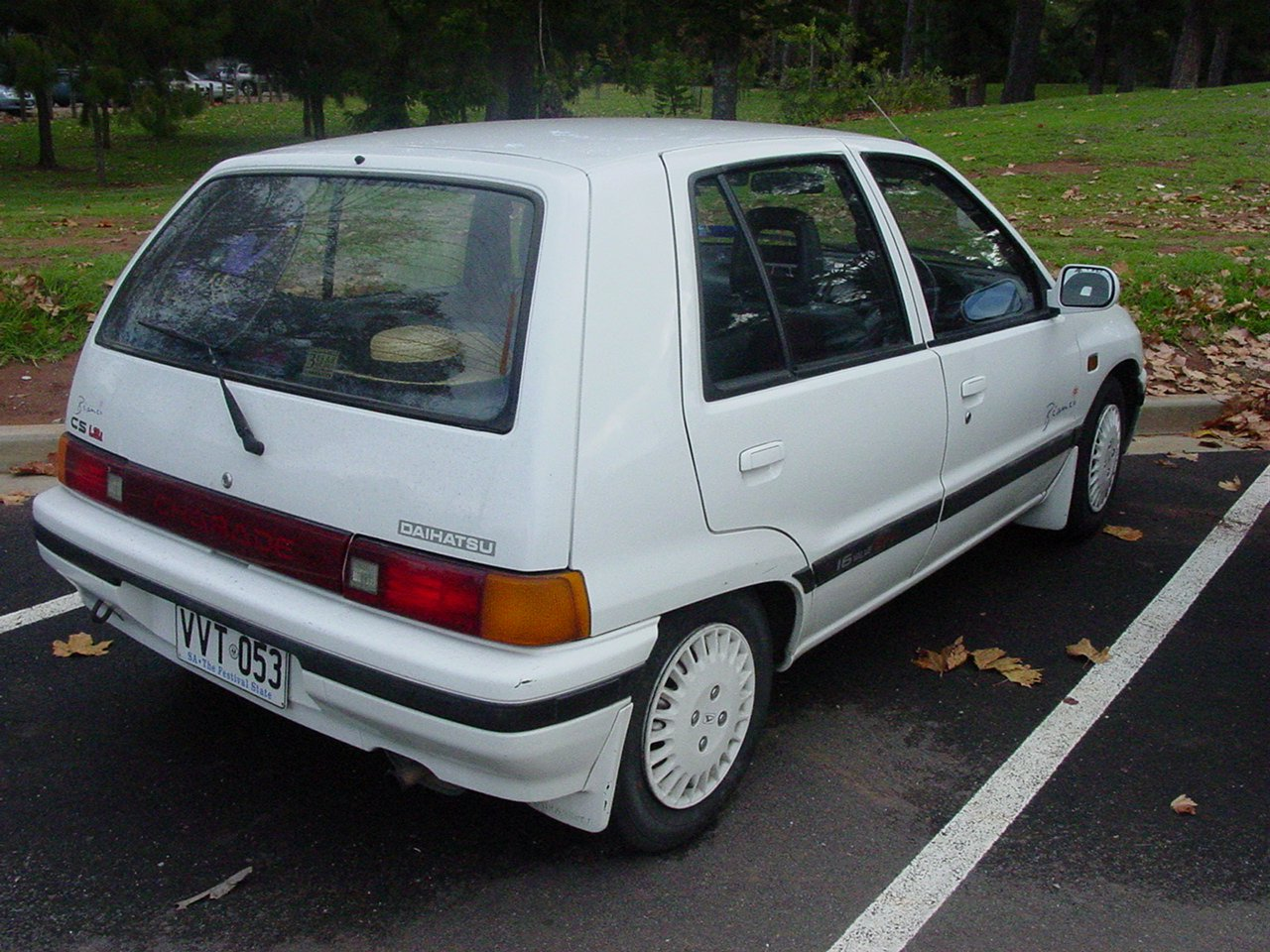
1989–1993 Daihatsu Charade 5-door (Australia)

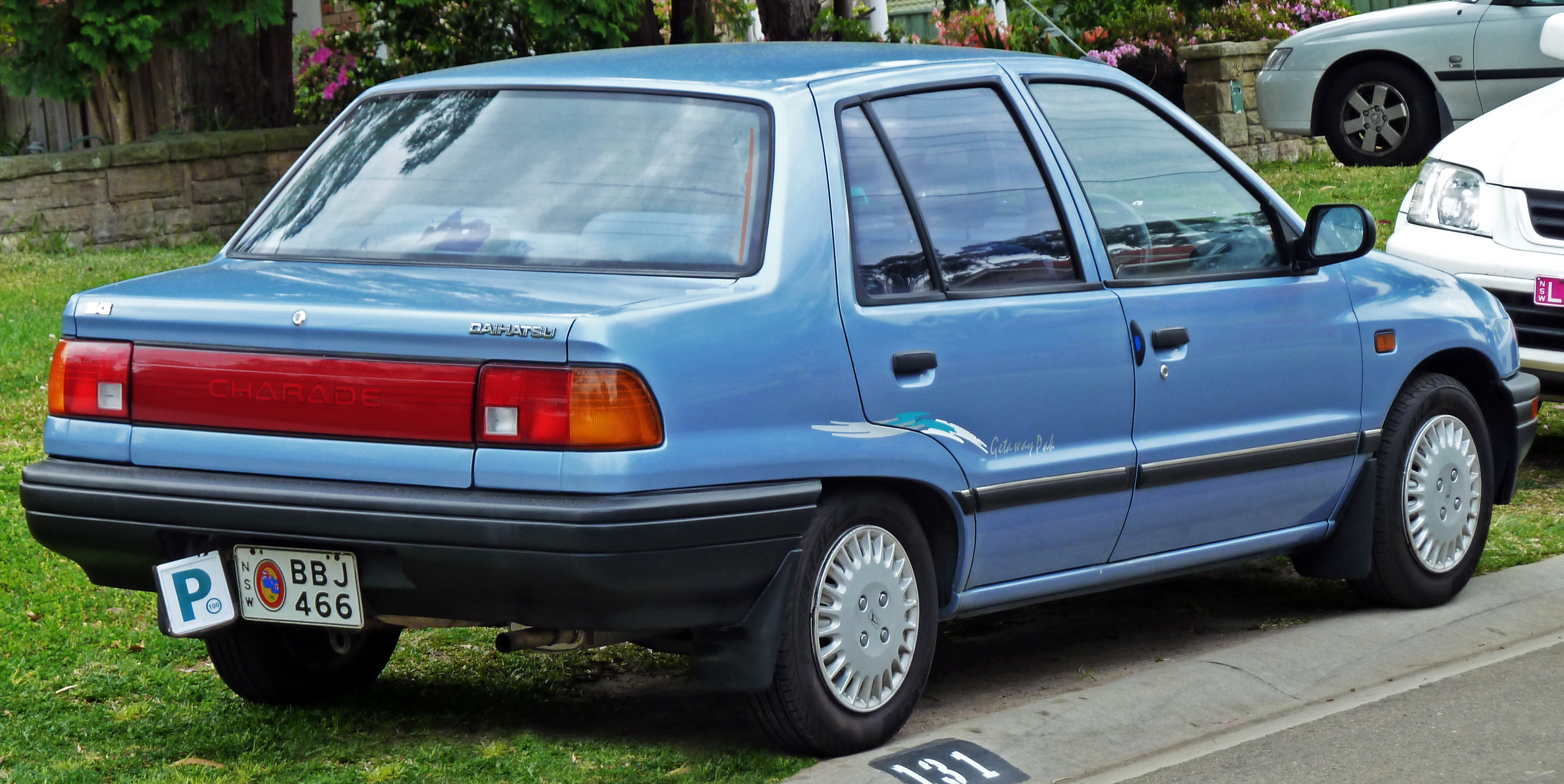
1989–1994 Daihatsu Charade sedan (Australia)

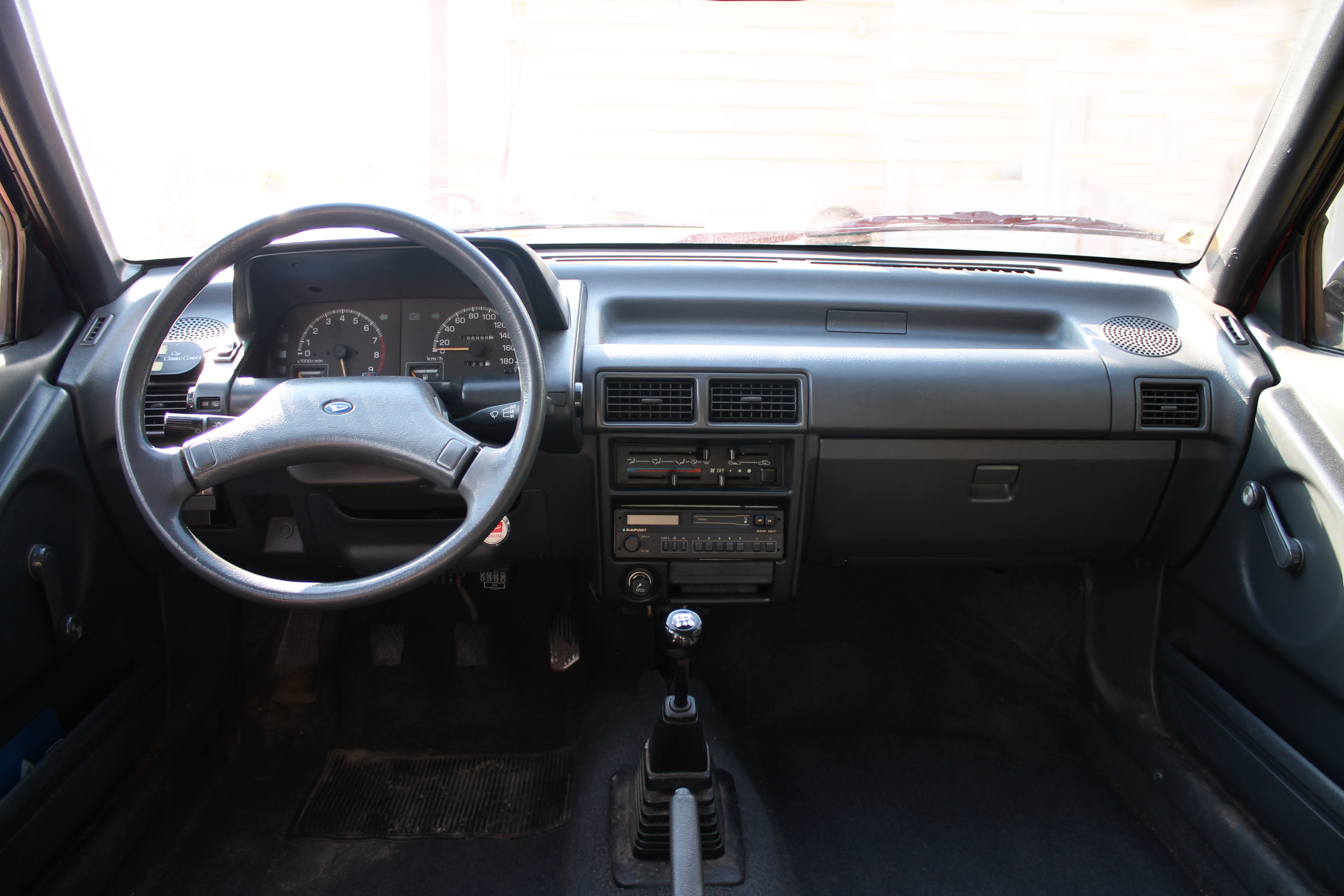
Interior with two-spoke steering wheel

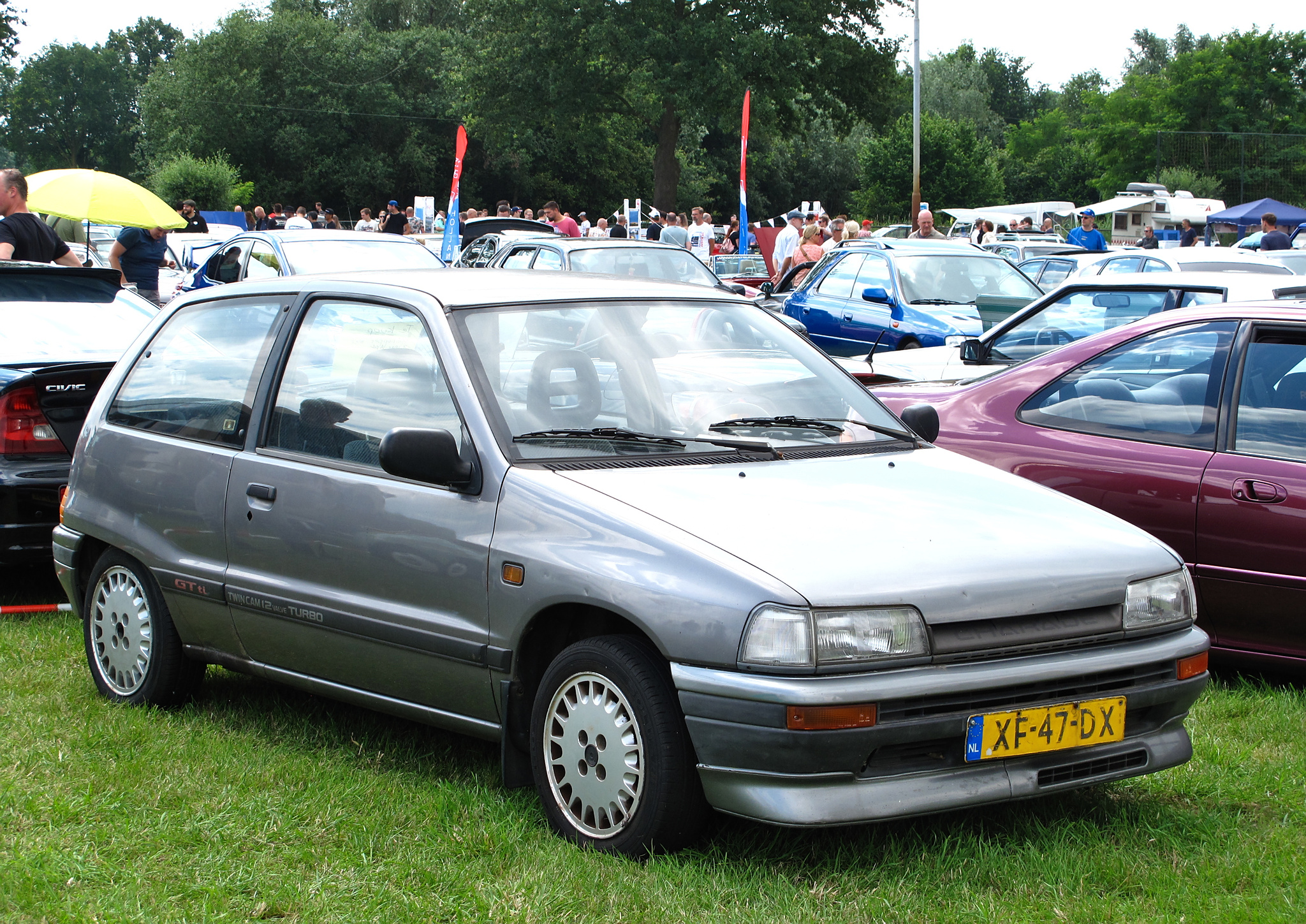
Daihatsu Charade GTti

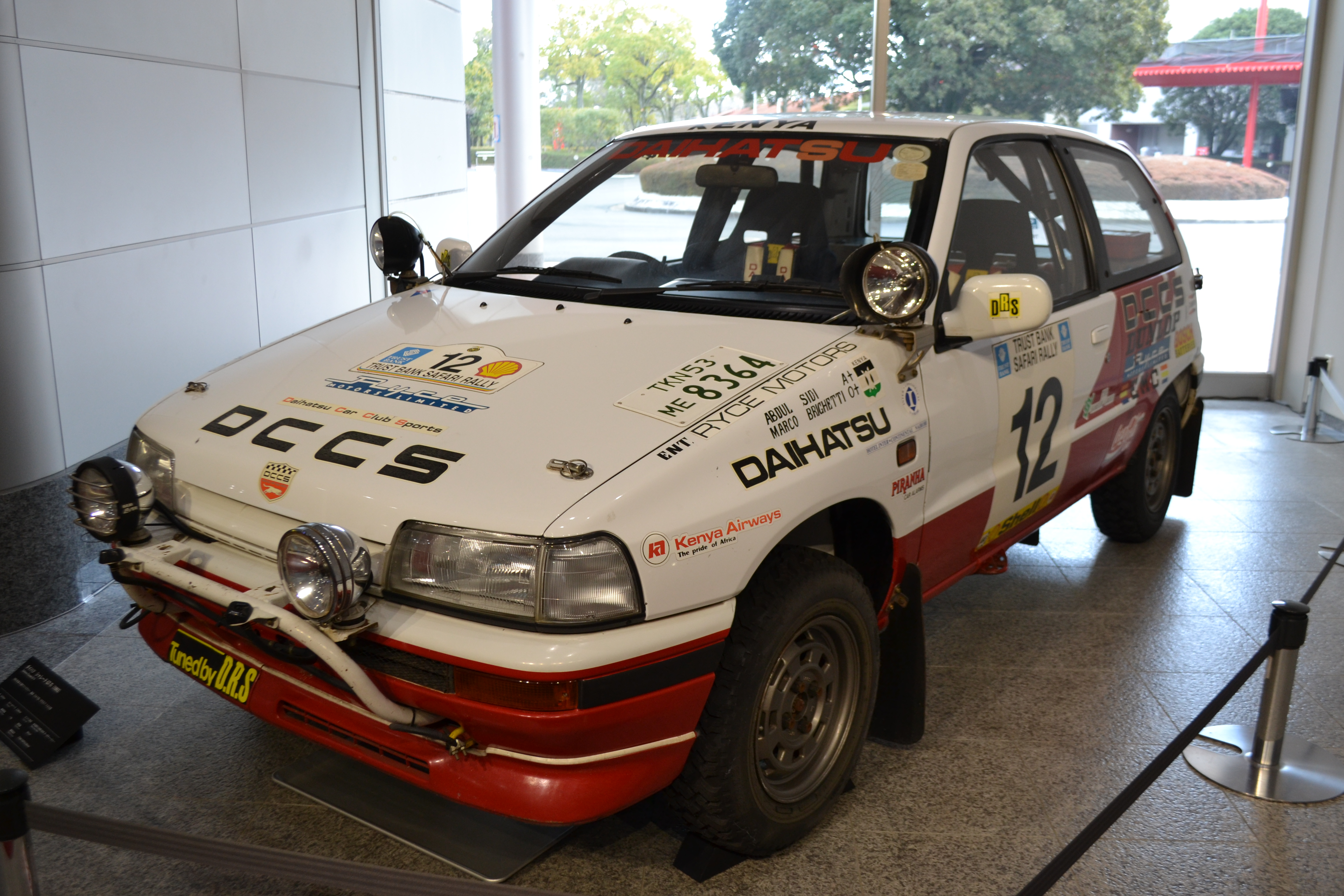
1992–1993 Daihatsu Charade GTti rally car

A slight facelift in February 1989 gave the cars smoother style rear lights and reflector panel, a slightly longer tailgate top spoiler, increased 70 mm length for hatchback (except for GTti/GT-XX), longer front blinkers (except for GTti/GT-XX) and a revised interior trim with fabric also on the door trim panels. A four-door sedan later expanded the range in April 1989, sold as the Charade Social in Japan. This generation was discontinued in 1993 for most markets, but the sedan version continued to be available in Japan until May 1994.

=== North America ===
The third-generation car was sold in the United States for just five years, from 1988 through 1992. The car sold poorly, despite construction "as tight as a frozen head bolt" and attractive styling for the market segment, perhaps because of its high price, few dealerships, rough-running three-cylinder, and low performance (0-60 mph or 97 km/h in 15 seconds). Toyota, which had recently procured a controlling interest in Daihatsu, retired the Daihatsu brand in the US market after an abbreviated 1992 model year, but continued to provide existing Daihatsu customers after-sales support through to at least 2002. Only the three-door hatchbacks and four-door sedans were available.

The North American Charade appeared in three different trim levels until 1989; the CES (base model), CLS, and CLX. For 1988, only a 53 bhp (54 PS; 40 kW), 1.0-litre three-cylinder, fuel injected engine called the CB90 was available. For 1989, the CLS and CLX also became available with the more powerful 1.3-litre four-cylinder SOHC 16-valve fuel injected, all-aluminum HC-E engine. This, along with the new availability of an automatic transmission and an expansion of dealerships, provided a useful boost to sales for the year.

For 1990, the trim levels were reduced to just two, the SE (base) and top trim package SX. The four-door sedan model was new for 1990. Four-cylinder models were available with a five-speed manual gearbox or a three-speed automatic transmission, while three-cylinder models were offered with the manual transmission only. From 1988 to 1991, only 43,590 Charades were sold in the US.

=== Australia ===
In the Australian market, the GTti was unavailable and the turbocharged petrol Charade used the lower powered carbureted engine (CB61) from the previous generation. Quite a few GTtis and GT-XXs have been imported from Japan and have a good following. In Australia, the third generation was assessed in the Used Car Safety Ratings as providing "worse than average" protection for its occupants in the event of a crash and the second generation was assessed as "significantly worse than average".

=== Taiwanese assembly ===
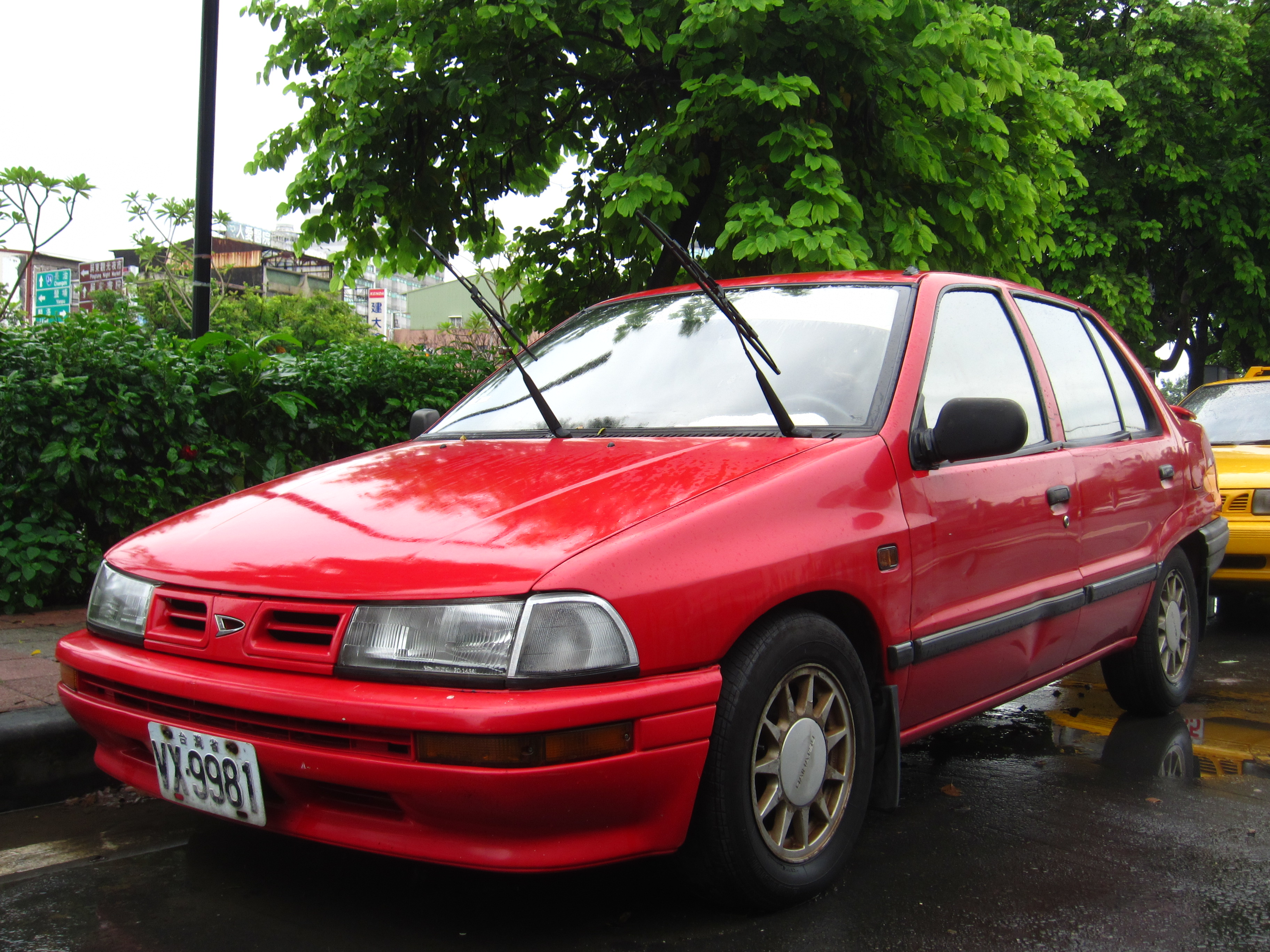
Daihatsu Social (facelift; Taiwan)

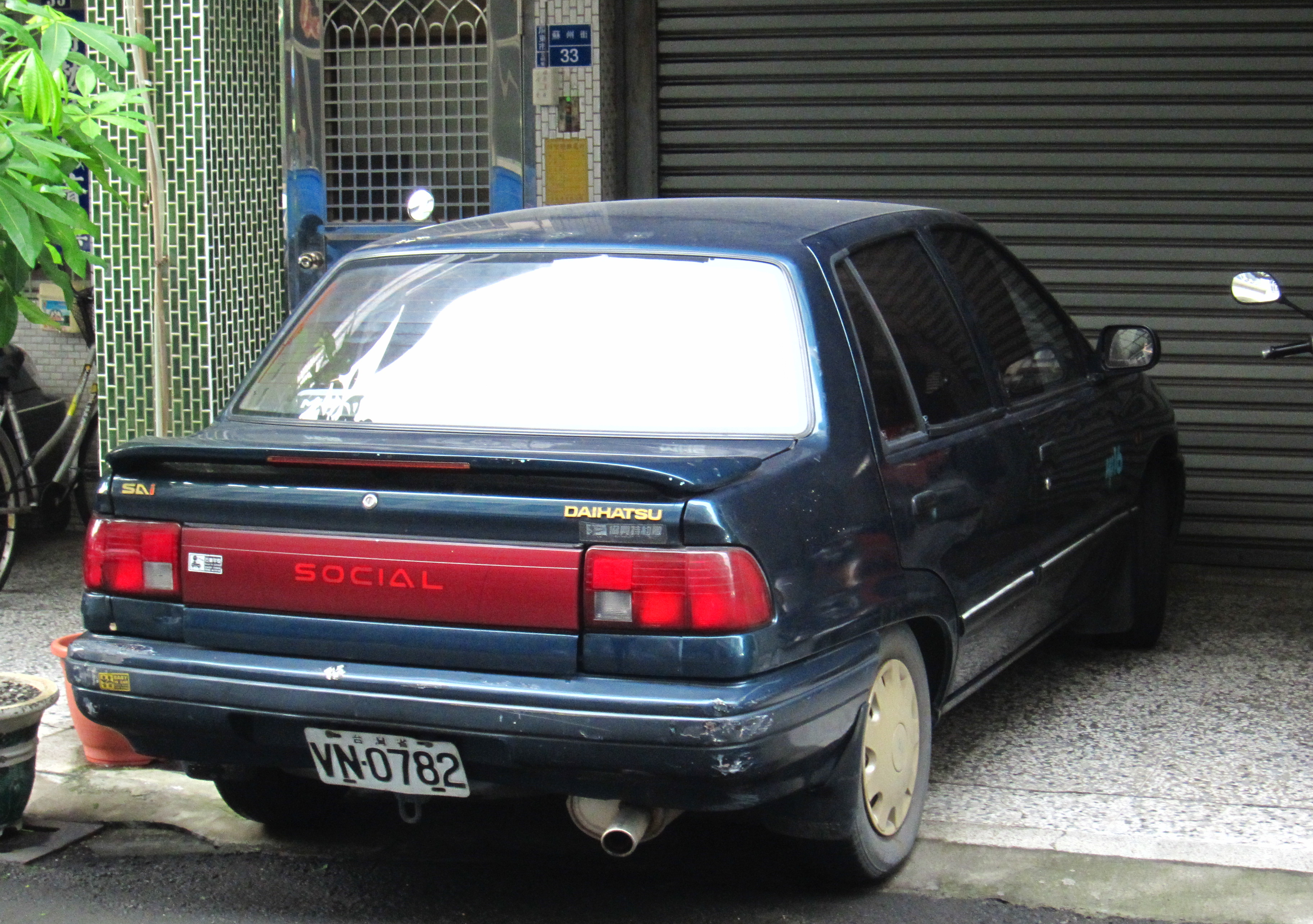
Daihatsu Social Mi-16 (Taiwan)

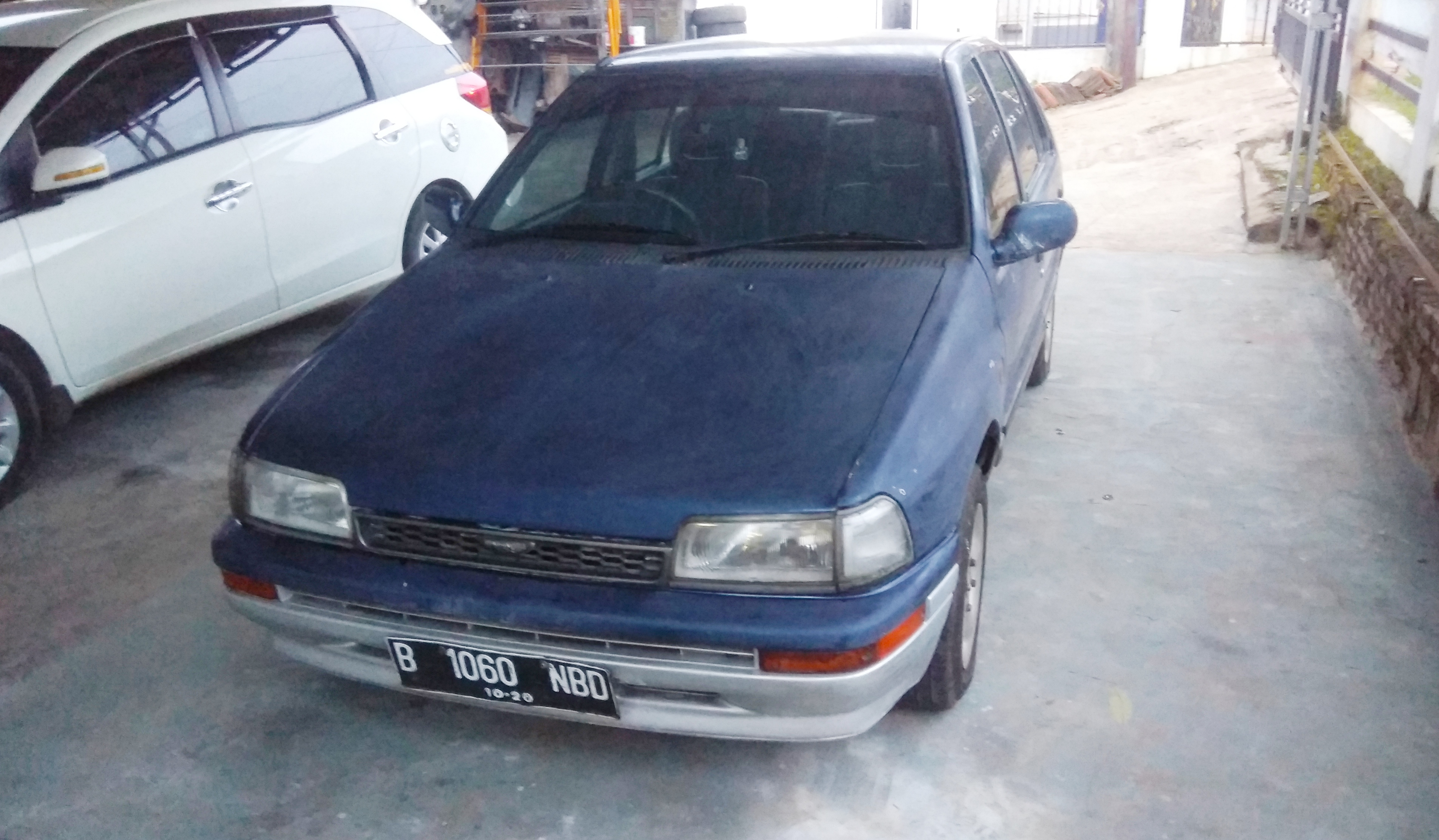
Daihatsu Charade Classy Royal (facelift, Indonesia)

Taiwanese assembly of the G100 began in 1989, although the Skywing liftback version of the G11 continued to be sold into 1990. It continued until local assembler Yu Tian went bankrupt in 1996 in the midst of a financial scandal.

=== Indonesian assembly ===
Daihatsu's subsidiary in Indonesia, Astra Daihatsu Motor, that was also producing the G10 and G11 Charades for local market also producing the G100 Charade starting in 1987. Initially, it was only available as a 5-door hatchback with 60 PS (59 hp; 44 kW) carbureted 1.0-litre three-cylinder CB23 petrol engine from the previous generation with a single CX trim. This model did not have power windows, power steering, rear wiper, nor alloy wheels. In 1990, the 76 PS (75 hp; 56 kW) 1.3-litre four-cylinder engined Winner 5-door hatchback and Classy SG Saloon sedan appeared. Unlike the basic CX, both Winner and Classy has better equipments such as power windows, power steering, electric mirrors, rear wiper for hatchback and alloy wheels. The facelifted hatchback model appeared in 1991 and the sales were stopped in 1993.

Due the high popularity of sedan segment in Indonesia before the 2000s, the Classy sedan continued to be produced with the same carbureted 76 PS (75 hp; 56 kW) 1.3-litre HC-C four-cylinder engine. It was strange because the neighboring countries, such as Malaysia and Australia, received the more modern G200 Charade. In 1994, the Classy sedan received minor changes with the new honeycomb grille and small rear spoiler, sold as Classy Pro. In 1996, another minor changes with new dual tone colours and leather seats became available as Classy Royal until the production was stopped in 1998.

=== Competition ===
The G100 Charade had a limited albeit fairly successful rally career. It won its class in the 1988 Monte Carlo Rally and continued to be competitive in the Safari Rally, where it finished 2nd in its class and 12th overall behind the Nissan March Turbo in 1988. It competed in the 1989 Lombard RAC Rally and finished at 4th place on its class or 32nd overall. In the 1990 Safari Rally, two Charade 1.3i models finished 1st and 2nd in their class, enough for 9th and 10th overall out of 59 starters.

The GTti won another class honours in 1991 and 1992 Safari Rally and was able to mix it with some of the 2.0-litre cars and on occasion troubling some of the considerably more powerful 4WD cars. With the "turbo factor" increased to 1.7, the one-litre Charade was later forced into the same category as the 2.0-litre cars. The best result was in the 1993 Safari Rally, where Charade GT-XX models finished 5th, 6th, and 7th overall.

== Fourth generation (G200; 1993–2000) ==
Fourth generation (G200)
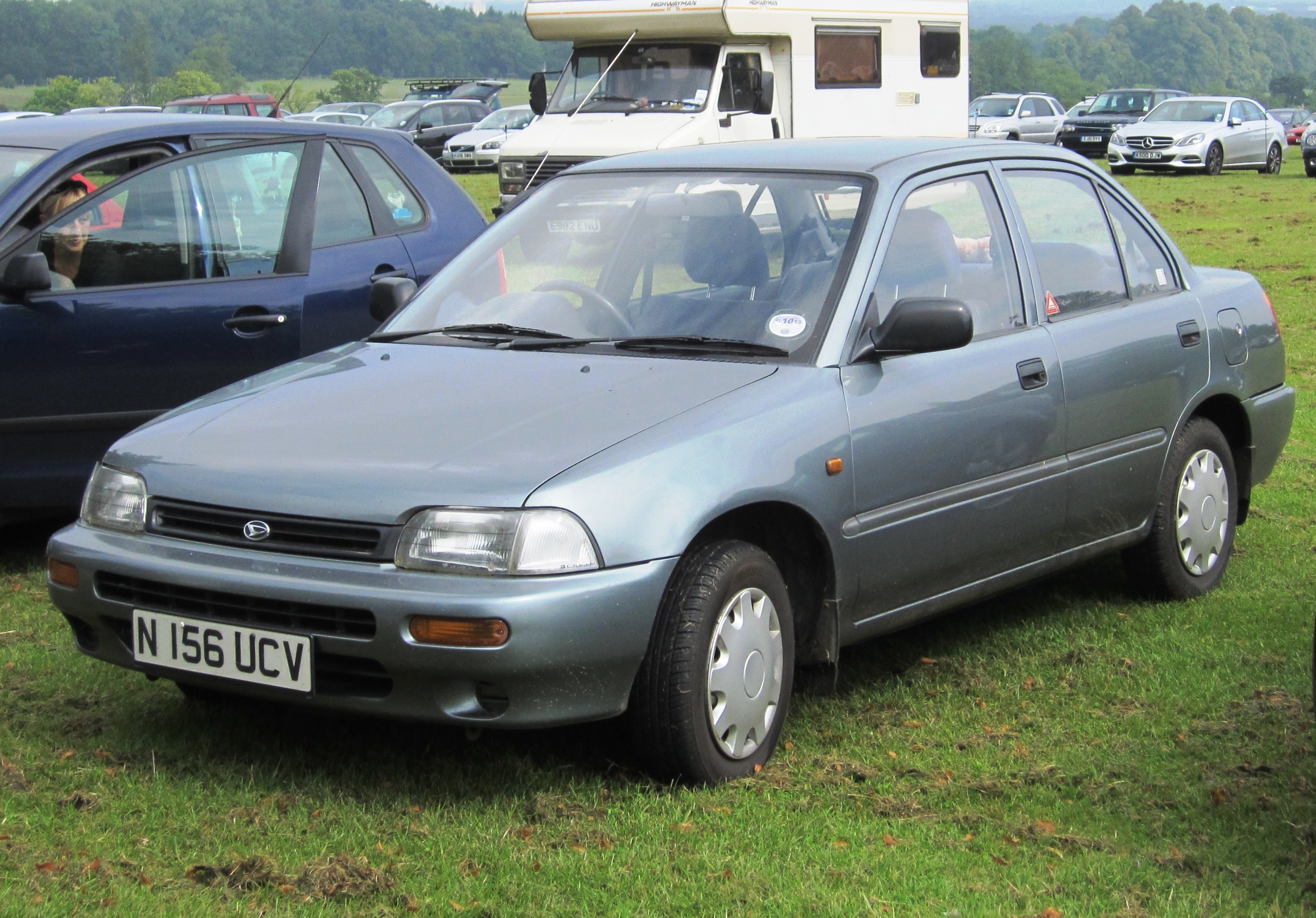
- 1994–1996 Daihatsu Charade GLXi saloon (UK)

Overview
- Also called: Daihatsu Valéra (Sedan, Netherlands); Daihatsu Ascend (Sedan, Malaysia)
- Production: January 1993 – May 2000

Body and chassis
- Body style: 3/5-door hatchback 4-door sedan
- Layout: Front-engine, front-wheel-drive Front-engine, four-wheel-drive (Note: Japanese models only)
- Related: Daihatsu Pyzar/Gran Move

Powertrain
- Engine: 993 cc CB24 I3 (G202: Australia, Brazil); 1.3 L HC I4 (G200); 1.5 L HE I4 (G203/213); 1.6 L HD I4 (G201)
- Transmission: 5-speed manual 3-speed automatic 4-speed automatic

Dimensions
- Wheelbase: 2,395 mm (94.3 in)
- Length: Hatchback: 3,780 mm (148.82 in); Sedan: 4,080 mm (160.8 in)
- Width: 1,620 mm (63.78 in)
- Height: 1,390 mm (54.72 in)
- Curb weight: 820–990 kg (1,810–2,180 lb)

The fourth generation was introduced in January 1993, again with hatchback and (later) sedan bodies. The design was more conservative than that of the third generation model. Being somewhat larger than the predecessor, in spite of a marginally longer wheelbase, it was still very compact. Although the 1.0-litre engines were no longer offered in most markets, the 1.0L remained available in the G202 Charade for Australia and also Brazil, where a lower tax rate for vehicles equipped with engines displacing less than 1.0 litres was in effect at the time.

The G202 came equipped with the CB24 1.0-litre engine. The heads and emission hose layout differ from those of the earlier CB23. The SOHC 1.3-litre became the base motor instead for most markets. The sedan, introduced in 1994, featured a 1.5-litre engine with optional 4WD. The bigger engines were available with hatchback bodywork. The four-wheel drive models received the G213 chassis code, while front-wheel-drive models had codes in the G200 range.

The diesel models were dropped in all markets where they had previously been available. In Australia, the fourth generation was assessed in the Used Car Safety Ratings as providing "worse than average" protection for its occupants in the event of a crash and the second generation was assessed as "significantly worse than average".

The turbocharged GTti version was replaced by a more conventional GTi with an SOHC 16-valve 1.6-litre engine. In the Japanese domestic market this version was named in honour of an Argentinian ex-racing driver Alejandro de Tomaso (the previous owner of Innocenti, who had worked closely with Daihatsu), including a racing-derived camshaft, and was capable of 124 PS (91 kW) JIS in the Japanese market.

The export version, simply called "GTi", was detuned to 105 PS (77 kW) DIN. De Tomaso added their own bodykit, Recaro seats, a Nardi Torino steering wheel, and Pirelli sports tires. A total of 120,000 Charade GTis were produced following this joint effort.

The Charade was restyled in 1996, only two years after release. It now had a "smiley face" grille and changed headlights, looking more like its Toyota sibling, the Starlet. It was produced until 2000, when it was replaced by the Sirion and Storia.

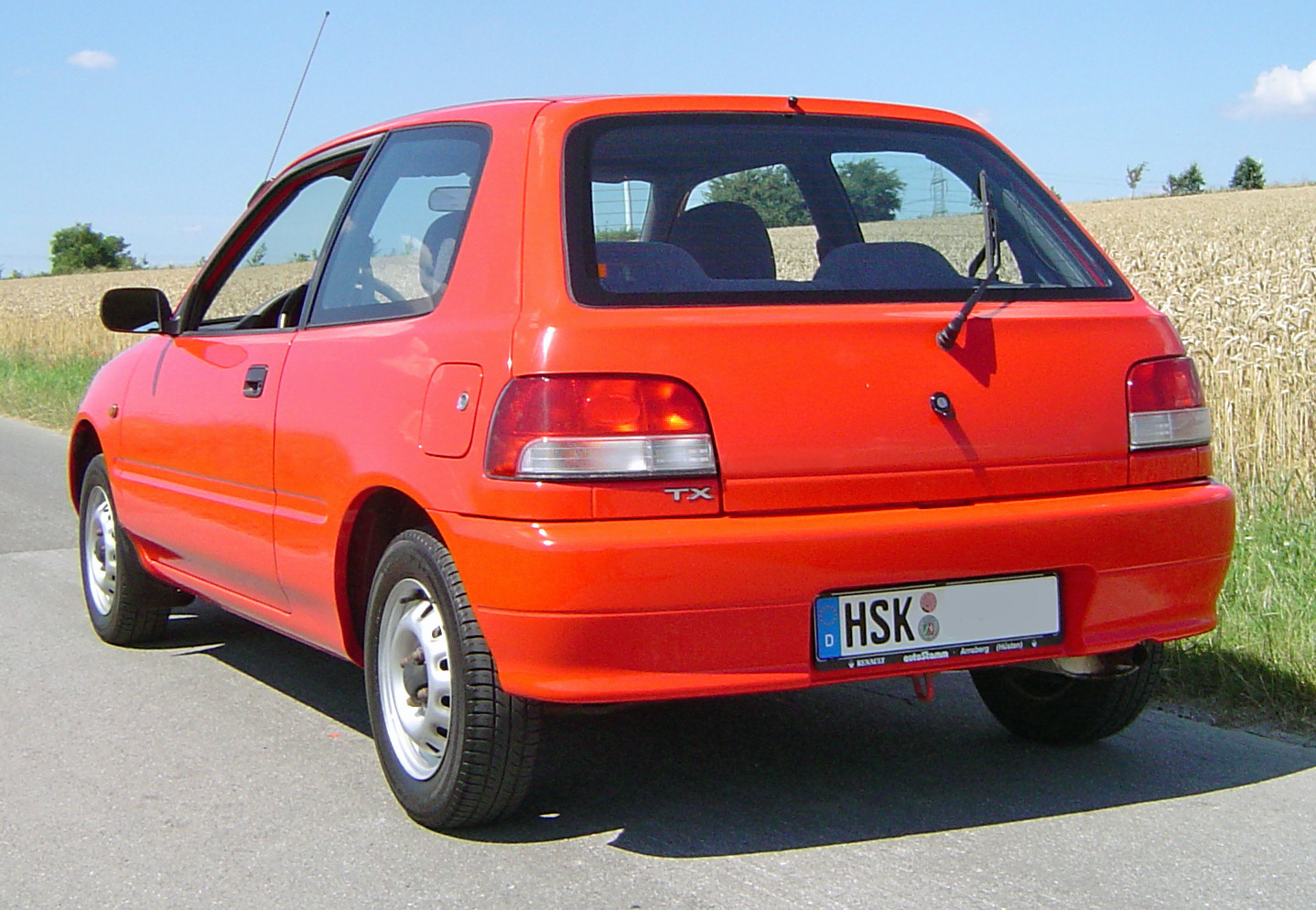
1993–1996 Daihatsu Charade TX 3-door (Germany)

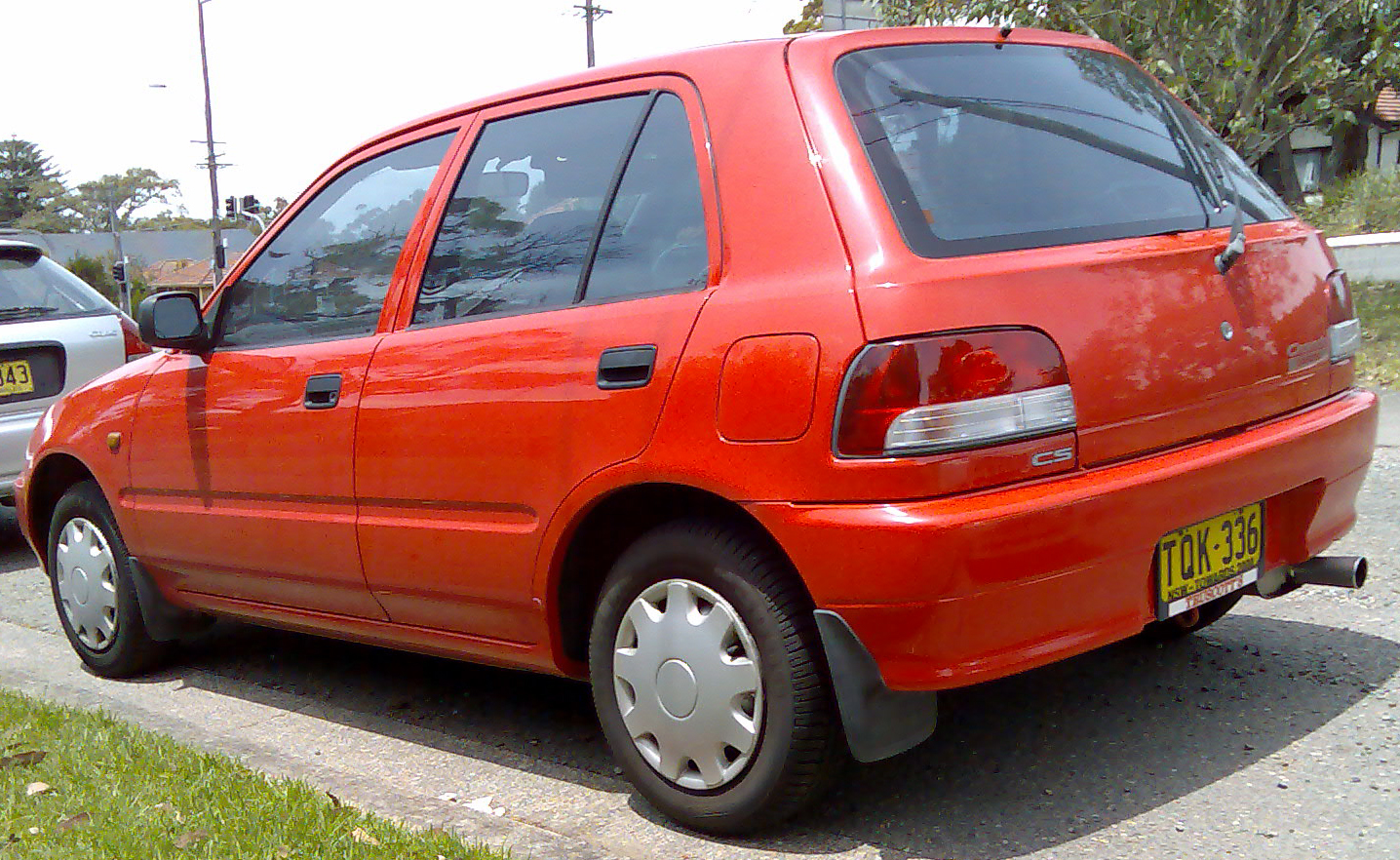
1993–1996 Daihatsu Charade CS 5-door (Australia)

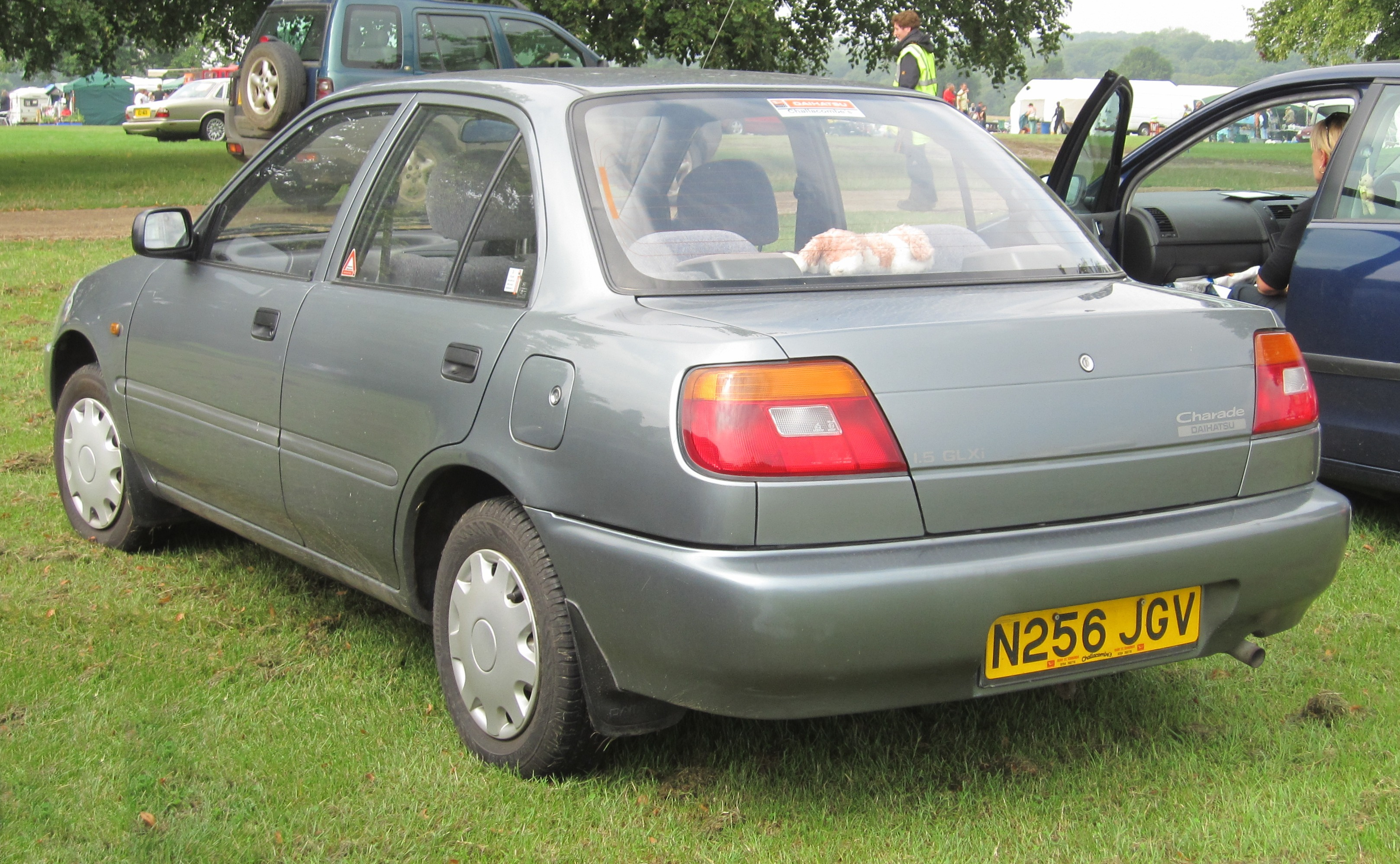
1994–1996 Daihatsu Charade GLXi saloon (UK)

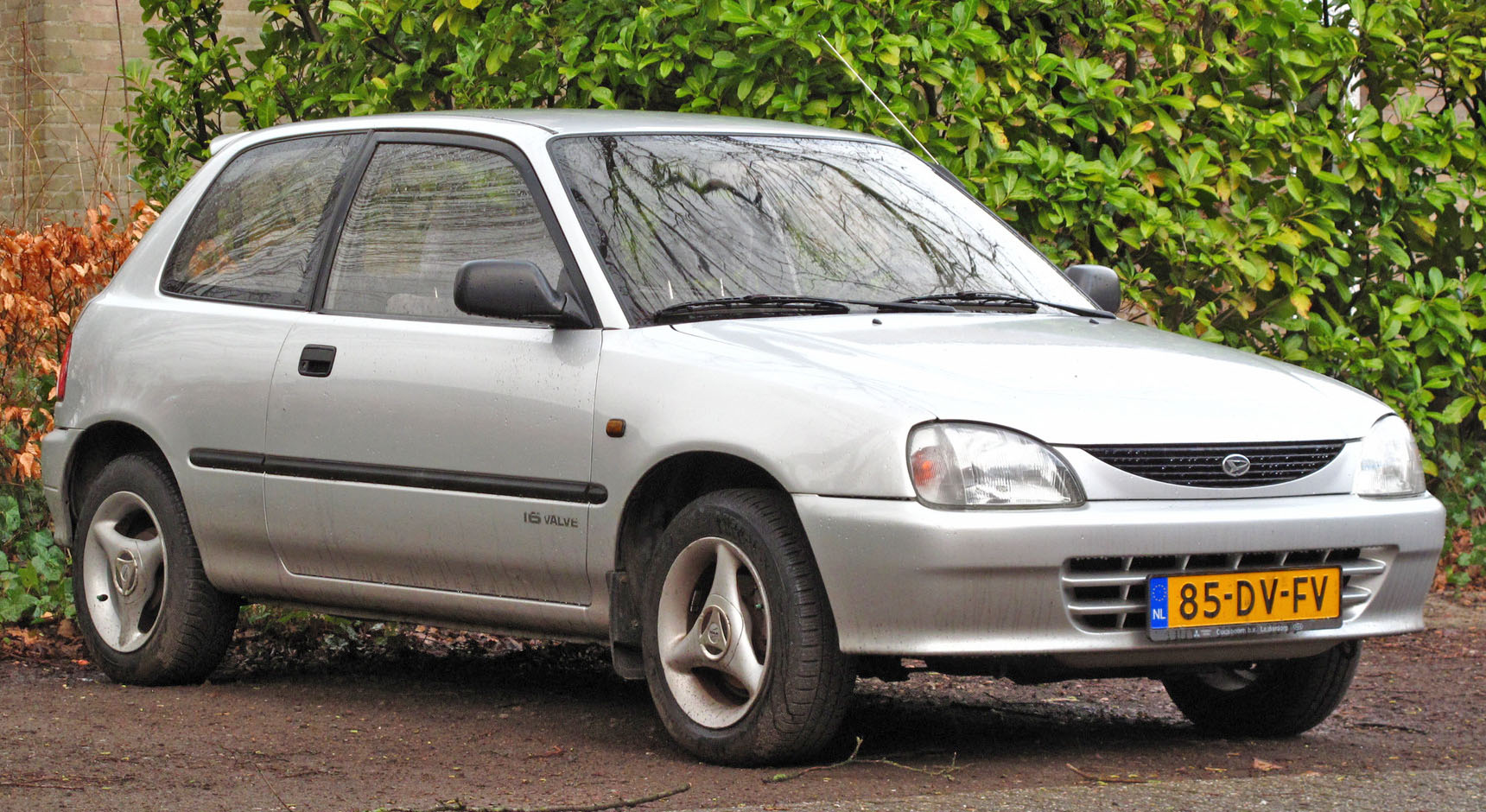
1996–2000 Daihatsu Charade 3-door (Netherlands)

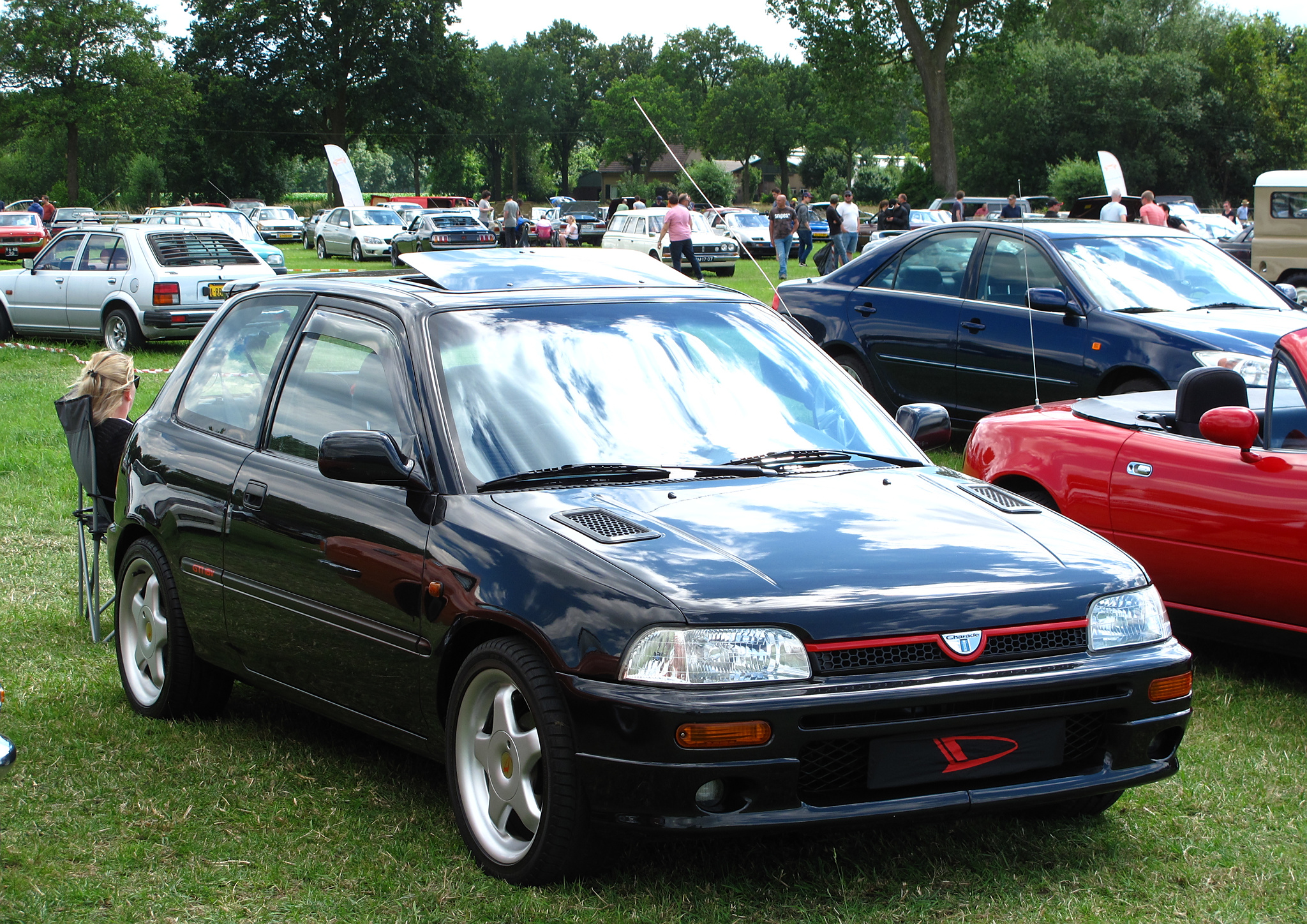
Daihatsu Charade GTi

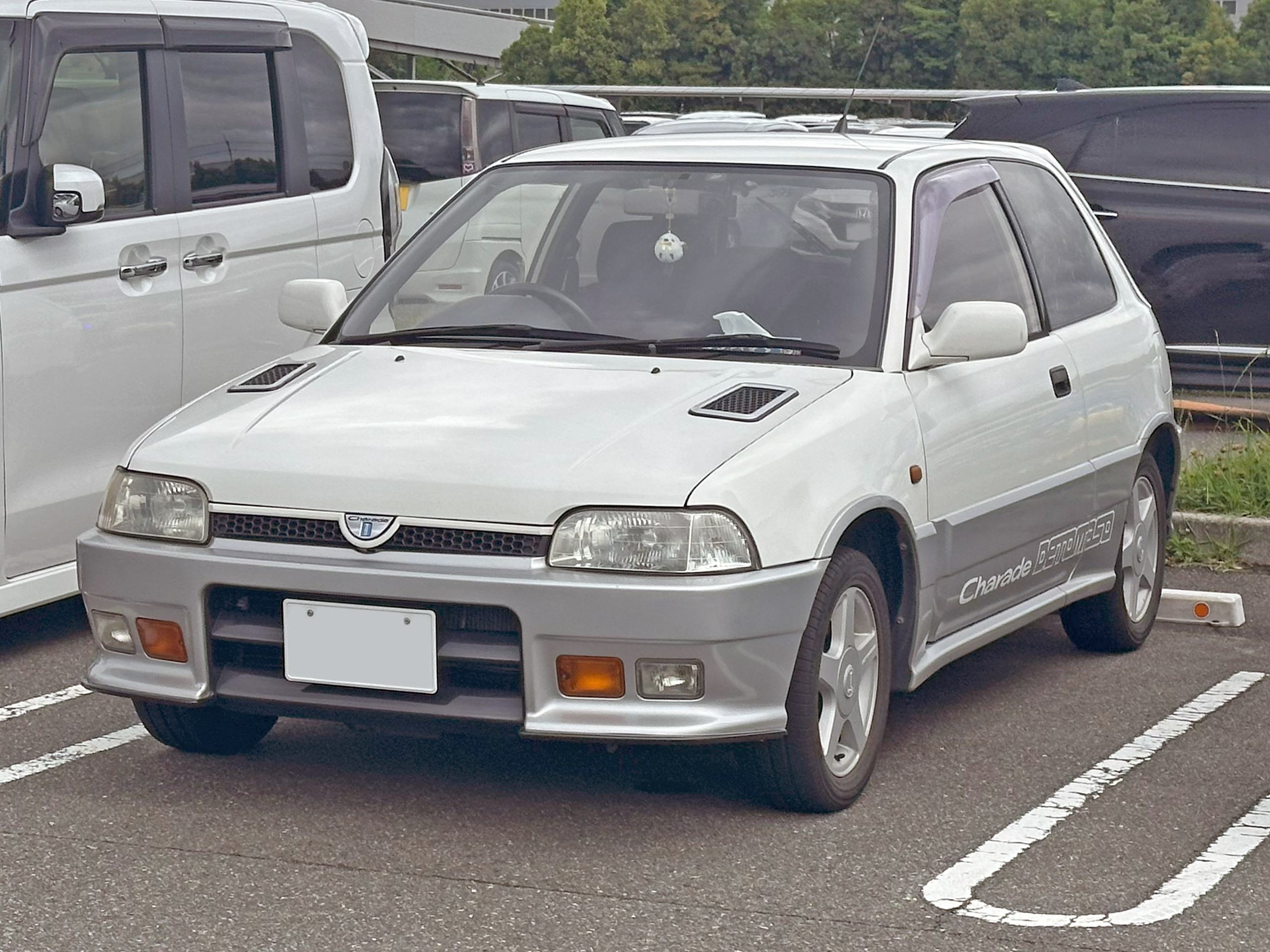
Daihatsu Charade De Tomaso (front)

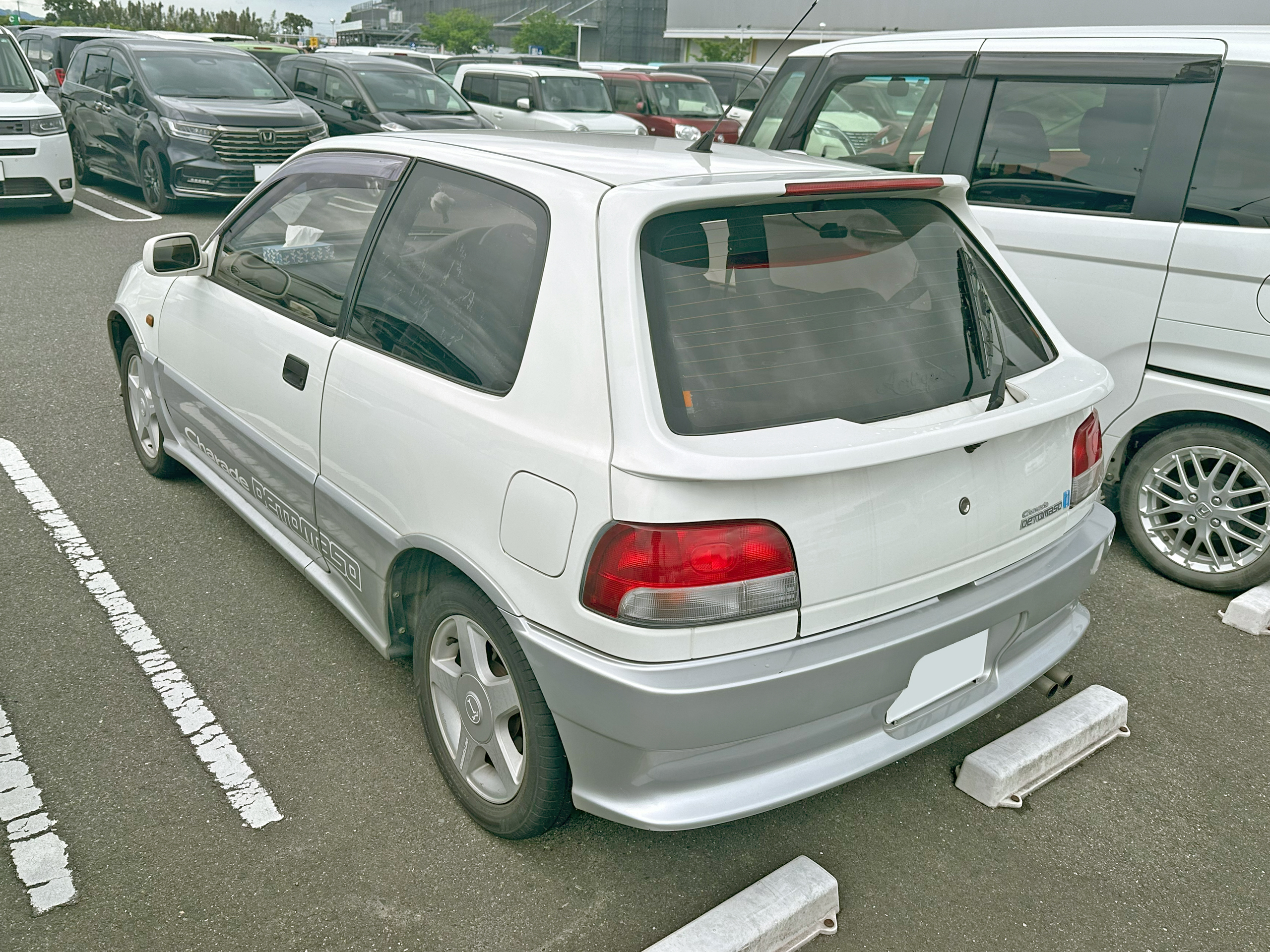
Daihatsu Charade De Tomaso (rear)

== Nameplate use with other vehicles ==
In Australia, the name had previously been used for the L500 series of the Daihatsu Mira, which was sold there as the Daihatsu Charade Centro between March 1995 and 1998.

In 2003, the Charade name was resurrected in Europe, Australia, and South Africa, on a rebadged version of the Daihatsu Mira (L250). It was positioned one market segment below its previous generations and was available as a three- or five-door hatchback with a 1.0-litre inline-four engine. It has since been discontinued in Australia in 2006, due to Toyota retiring the Daihatsu nameplate there. The L250 series of the Daihatsu Mira was produced for other markets until 2007.

From 2007, Daihatsu in South Africa offered the Daihatsu Mira (L275) as the Charade in that market. Production ended around 2011.

Between 2011 and 2013, Daihatsu Europe sold the France-built Toyota Yaris (XP90) on the market as the Daihatsu Charade. This was the last Charade model introduced under the Daihatsu nameplate in Europe.

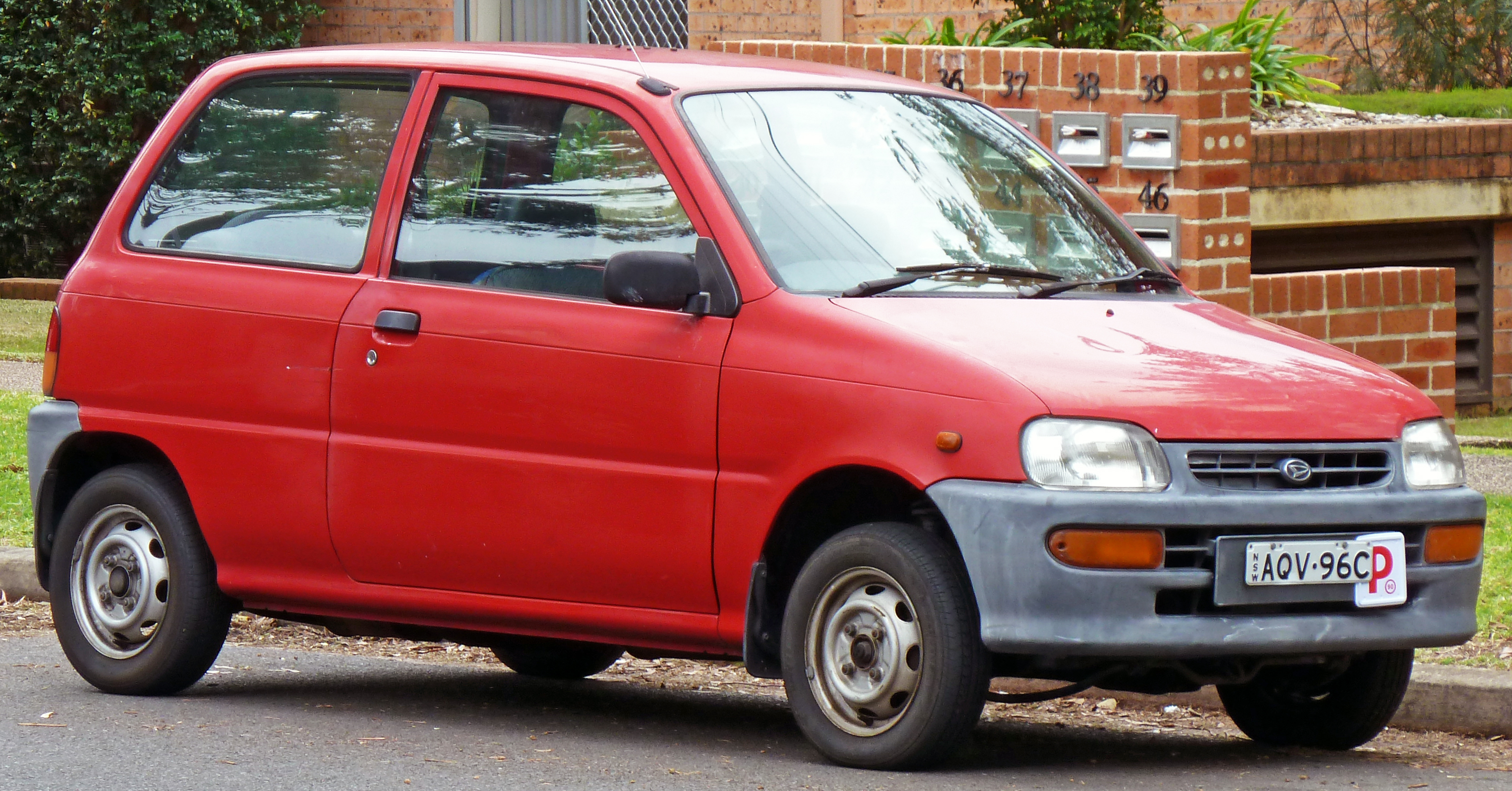
1995–1998 Daihatsu Charade Centro
(Australia)

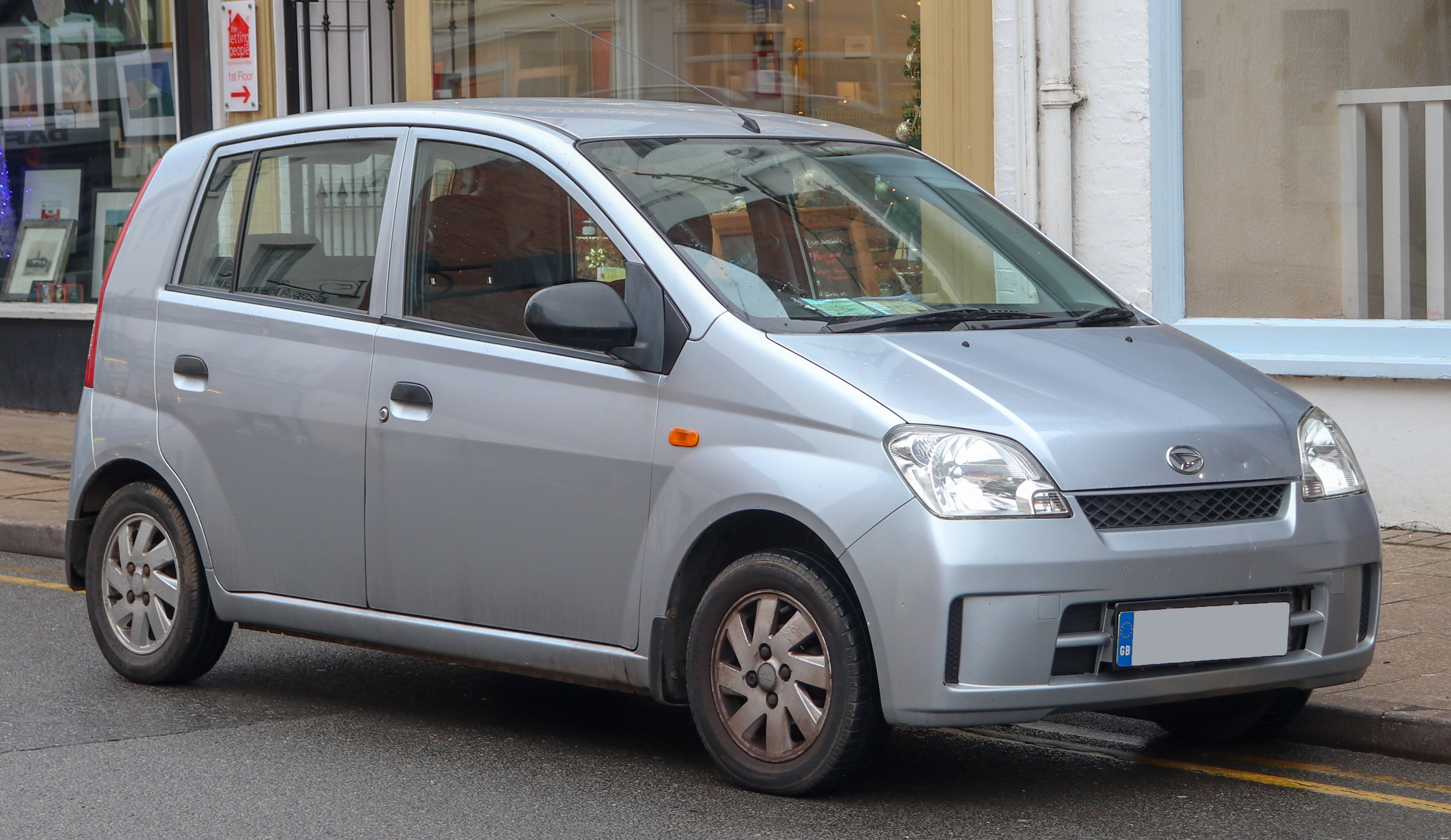
2003–2007 Daihatsu Charade
(Australia/Europe/South Africa)

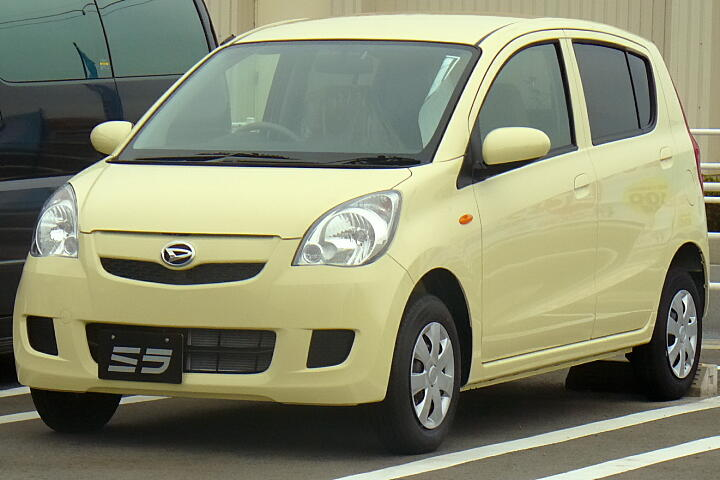
2007–2011 Daihatsu Charade
(South Africa)

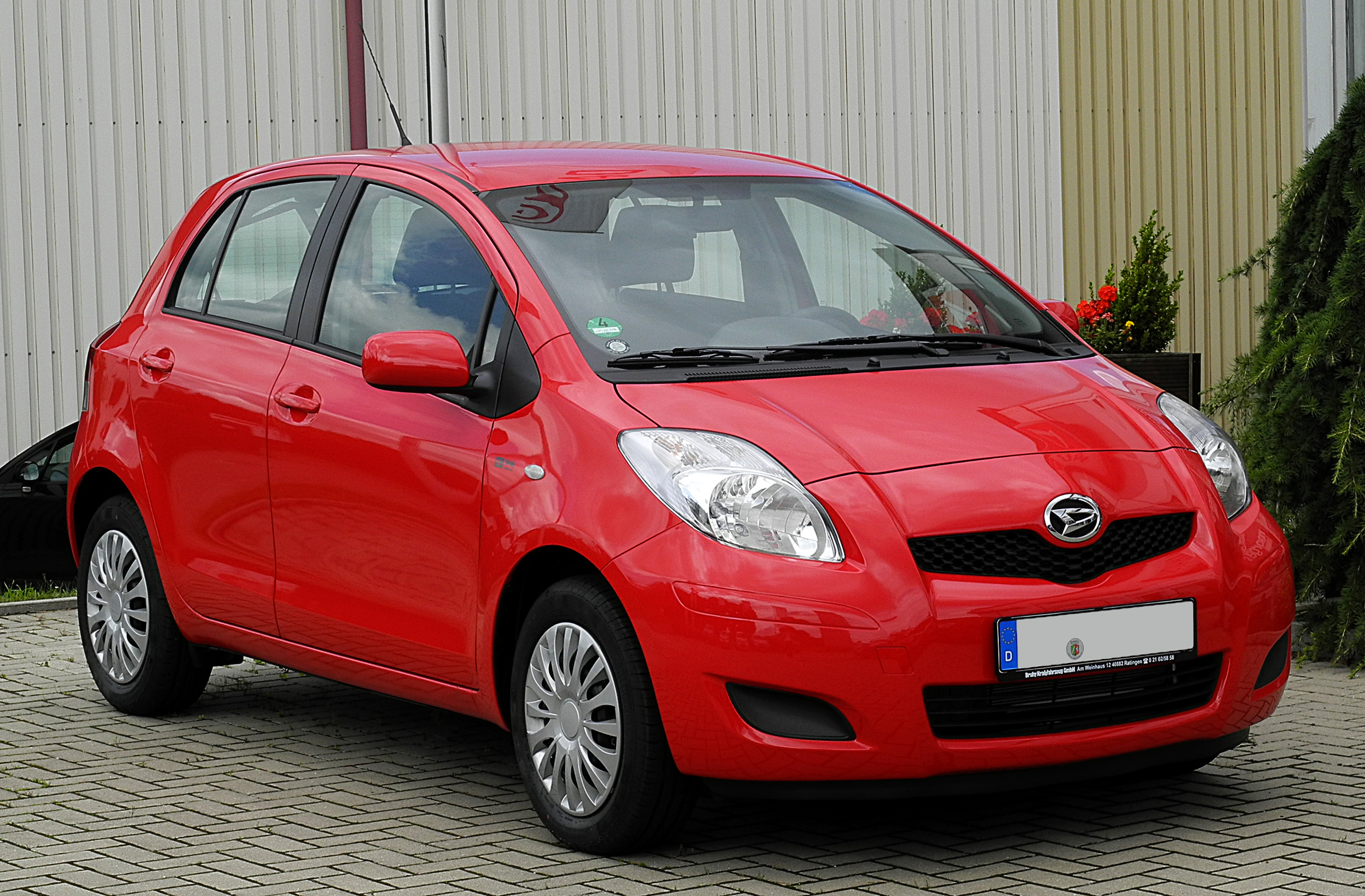
2011–2013 Daihatsu Charade
(Europe)

== Chinese copies and derivatives ==
Chinese copies and derivatives
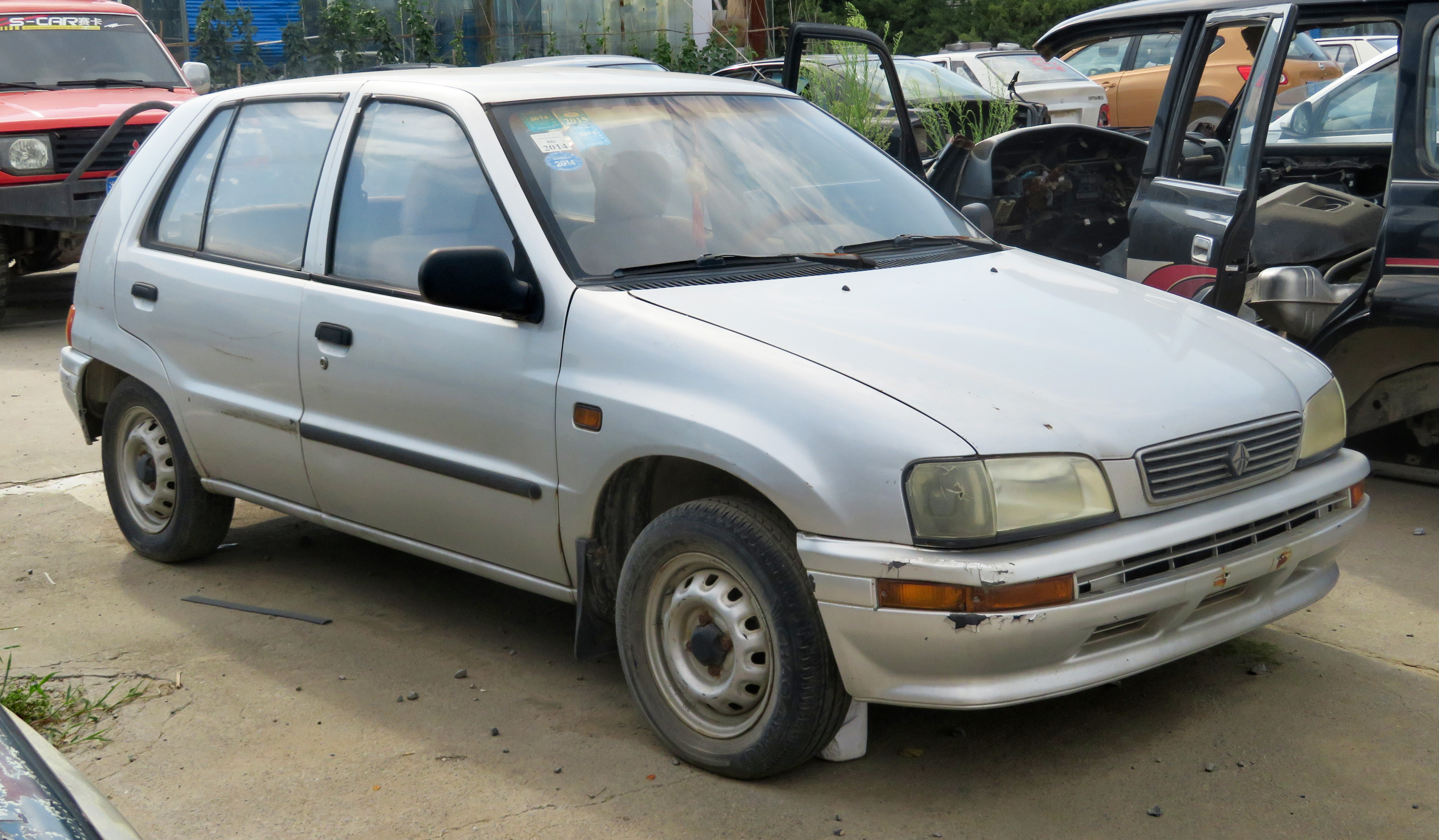
- Xiali TJ7101/TJ7131

Overview
- Production: 1986–2012 (Xiali); 1988–1995 (Ling Kong); 1996–1999 (CMC Zhonghua); 1996–2003 (Anda'er); 1998–2007 (Geely)
- Assembly: Tianjin (Tianjin FAW); Luoyang, Henan (Ling Kong); Beijing, China (CMC Zhonghua); Anqing, Anhui (Anda'er); Taizhou, Zhejiang (Geely)

Body and chassis
- Body style: 5-door hatchback 4-door sedan 5-door MPV; 5-door notchback 2-door van/pickup

Powertrain
- Engine: Xiali: 993 cc CA3GA2 I3 (2008–2012 N3); 993 cc TJ376QE I3 (TJ7100/TJ7101 series, 2004–2005 N3, 2006 Xiali A+, 2008 N3+ hatch and sedan); 1052 cc TJ378QE I4 (2005 Xiali N3 hatch and sedan); 1342 cc 8A-FE I4 (2004 N3 hatch); 1425 cc CA4GB1 I4 (2004–2005 Xiali Shenya/Junya/A+, 2008 Xiali N3+); Ling Kong: 1.0 L 377Q-L I4; 1.0 L DA462 I4; 1.0 L JL462 I4; Geely: 993 cc JL376QE I3 (Liangjing, JL1010N/E1); 1.3 L JL/MR479Q I4 (Haoqing SRV, JL1010N/E1, MR); 1.5 L MR479A I4 (JL1010N, MR)
- Transmission: 5 speed manual 4 speed manual

Dimensions
- Wheelbase: Xiali: Standard (Geely HQ/JL/MR): 2,340 mm (92.1 in); LWB: 2,420 mm (95.3 in); Ling Kong; KJ6380 sedan:2,460 mm (96.9 in); Anda'er; AAQ 6370: 2,300 mm (90.6 in)
- Length: Xiali: N3 hatchback: 3,744 mm (147.4 in); A+ hatchback: 3,900 mm (153.5 in); Xiali sedan: 3,993 mm (157.2 in); Xiali sedan (LWB): 4,074 mm (160.4 in); Xiali N3 sedan: 4,069 mm (160.2 in)/3,754 mm (147.8 in) (2012 model year); Xiali A+ sedan: 3,993 mm (157.2 in); Ling Kong: 3,800 mm (149.6 in) (KJ6380 sedan); Anda'er: AAQ 6370: 3,750 mm (147.6 in); Geely: Pride HQ7130B1U/Pride SRV: 3,900 mm (153.5 in); Liangjing JL63601E: 3,650 mm (143.7 in); MR: 3,825 mm (150.6 in); Merrie/Uliou: 4,150 mm (163.4 in); JL1010N/JL5010X: 3,965 mm (156.1 in)
- Width: Xiali: 1,615 mm (63.6 in); Ling Kong: 1,510 mm (59.4 in) (KJ6380 sedan); Anda'er: AAQ 6370: 1,580 mm (62.2 in); Geely: Haoqing SRV: 1,650 mm (65.0 in); Liangjing JL63601E: 1,635 mm (64.4 in); MR: 1,670 mm (65.7 in); Merrie/Uliou: 1,620 mm (63.8 in); JL1010N/JL5010X: 1,640 mm (64.6 in)
- Height: Xiali: 1,385 mm (54.5 in); Ling Kong: 1,480 mm (58.3 in) (KJ6380 sedan); Anda'er: AAQ 6370: 1,770 mm (69.7 in); Geely: Haoqing SRV: 1,420 mm (55.9 in); Liangjing JL63601E: 1,410 mm (55.5 in); MR: 1,386 mm (54.6 in); Merrie/Uliou: 1,450 mm (57.1 in); JL1010N/JL51010X: 1,435 mm (56.5 in)

The Tianjin Xiali TJ730, based on the G11 Charade was built by FAW Tianjin from knock-down kits from 1986 to 1988. It was then replaced by the Xiali TJ7100 and TJ7100U, which were both based on the G100 and G102, respectively. The hatchback commenced production in 1988, while the sedan arrived in October 1990 for the 1991 model year. Both variants were produced up to 1997 and 1999 respectively where facelifted versions with more modern Toyota engines were put into production. The Xiali N3 commenced production in 2004, was given a minor facelift for 2008, and was facelifted again in 2010, with production ending soon after. It, however, is still displayed on the Tianjin FAW website as of 2018.

Production for most versions ended in 2006. The TJ7101AU and TJ7141AU continued production and were also known as the Junya (Junior) (from 2005) and Shenya (Senior) (from 2003) and came equipped with the 1-litre Daihatsu-based TJ376QE three cylinder or a 1.4-litre engine known as the 4GB1 with four cylinders (from 2005 onwards). The Shenya and Junya were both given a facelift for 2006 and continued until production ended in 2011.

All Xiali-based Charades had a 4-speed manual on early models and later models with a 5-speed manual gearbox as standard. The Xiali brand was defunct in 2015.

The Xiali was also used a taxicab in Beijing throughout the 1980s and 1990s coloured in a red livery with Chinese characters in white, and the fare was 1.2 yuan per kilometer, lower than Citroën Fukang whose fare was 1.6 yuan per kilometer. The Xiali taxi was retired from the taxi market in February 2006 in an effort to cut down pollution where the Hyundai Elantra replaced it. It was also available as a taxicab in its home city, Tianjin and Shanxi.

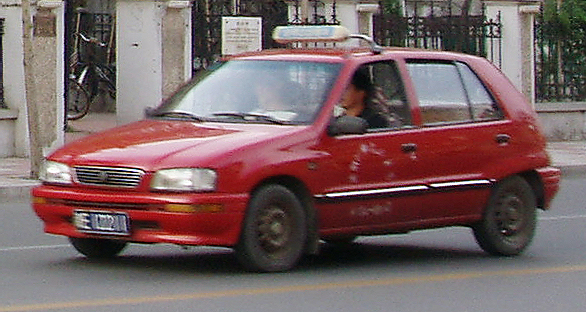
1999–2007 Xiali TJ7101

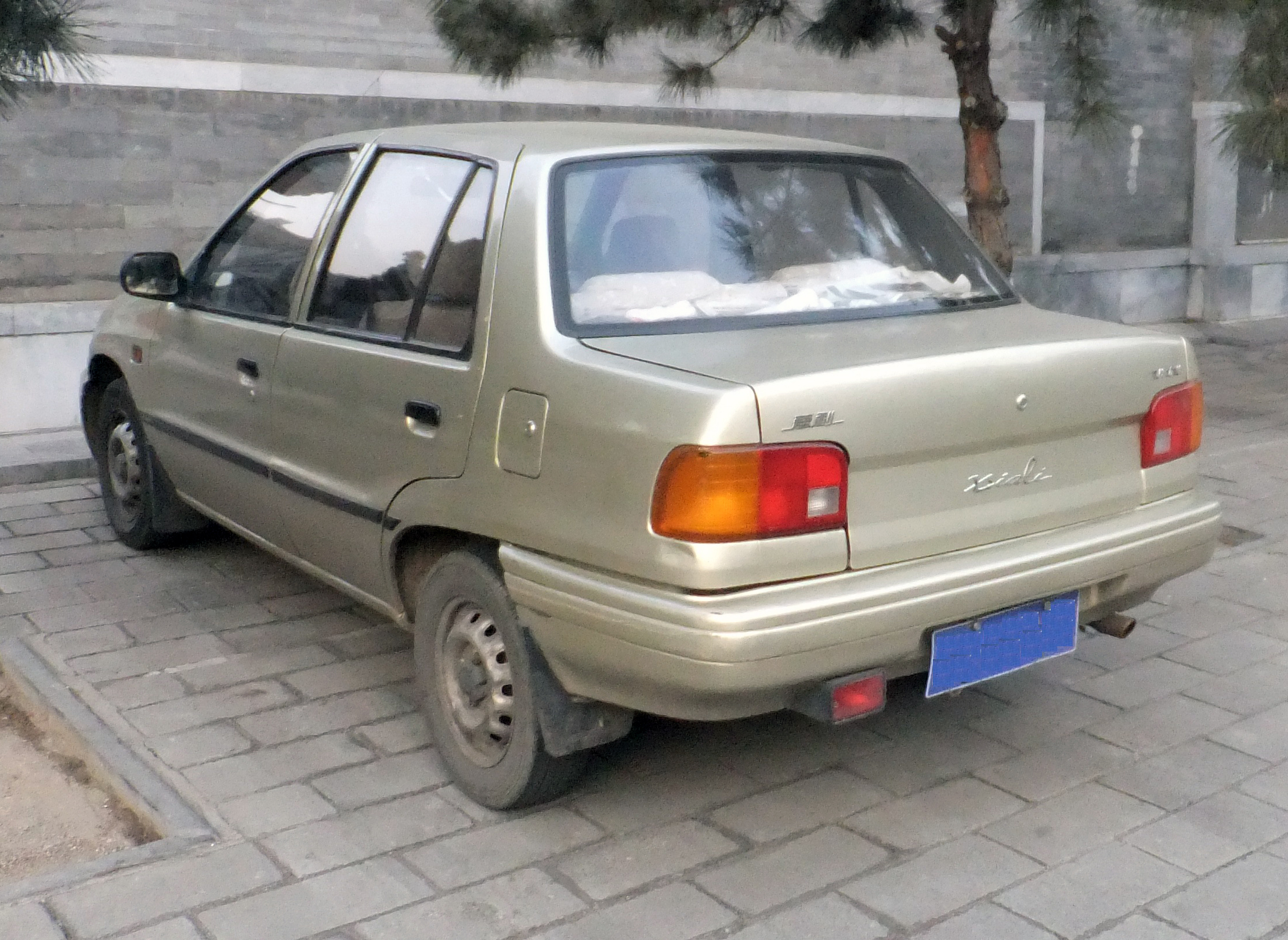
2001–2006 Tianjin Xiali TJ7101U

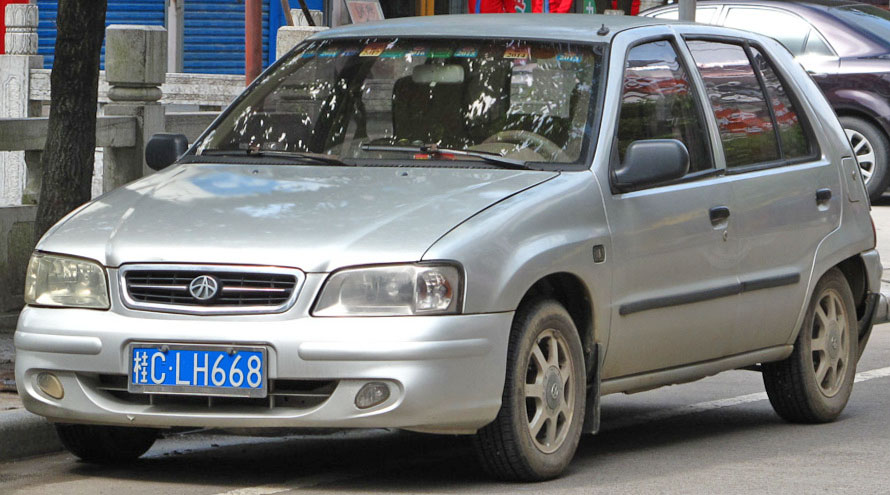
2005–2006 Tianjin Junya TJ7131A

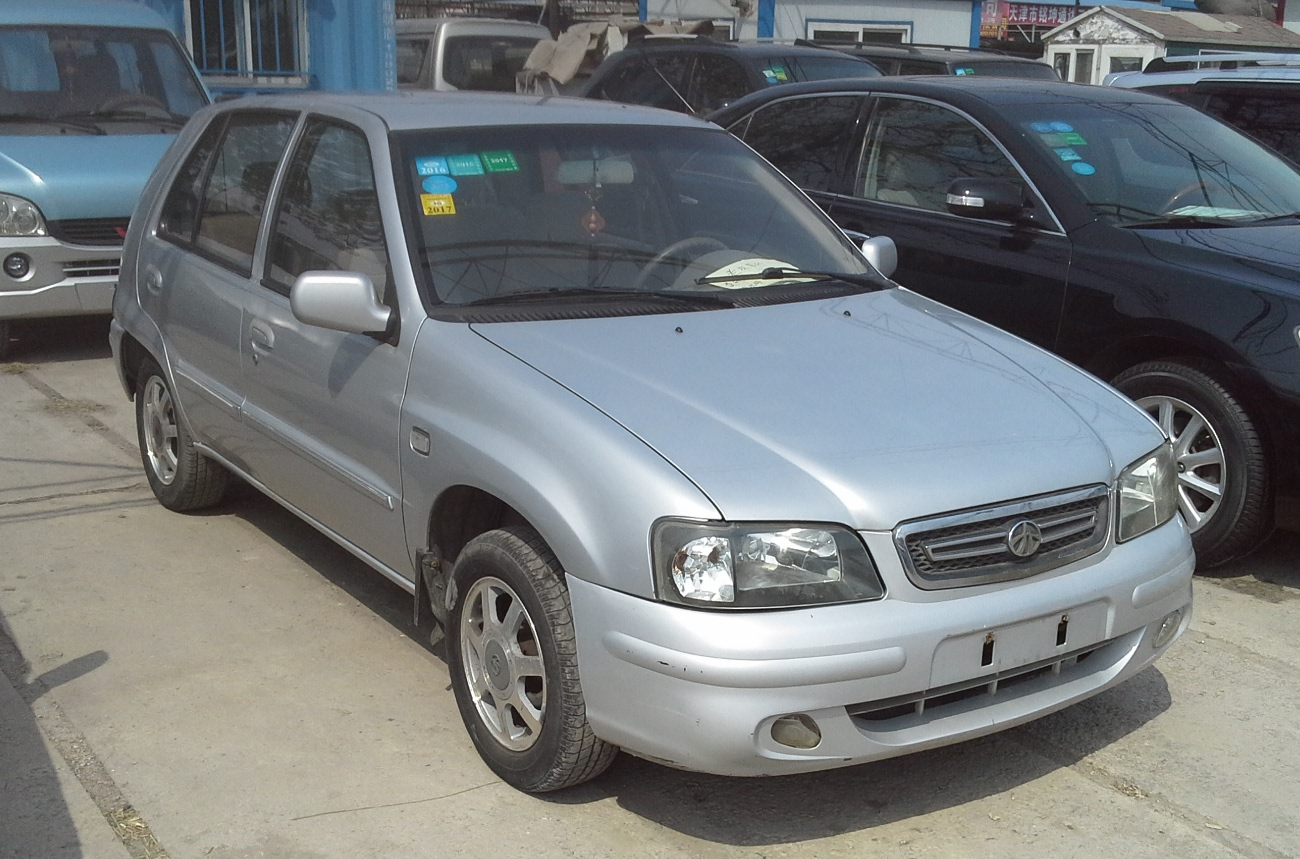
2005–2011 Tianjin Xiali A+ hatch

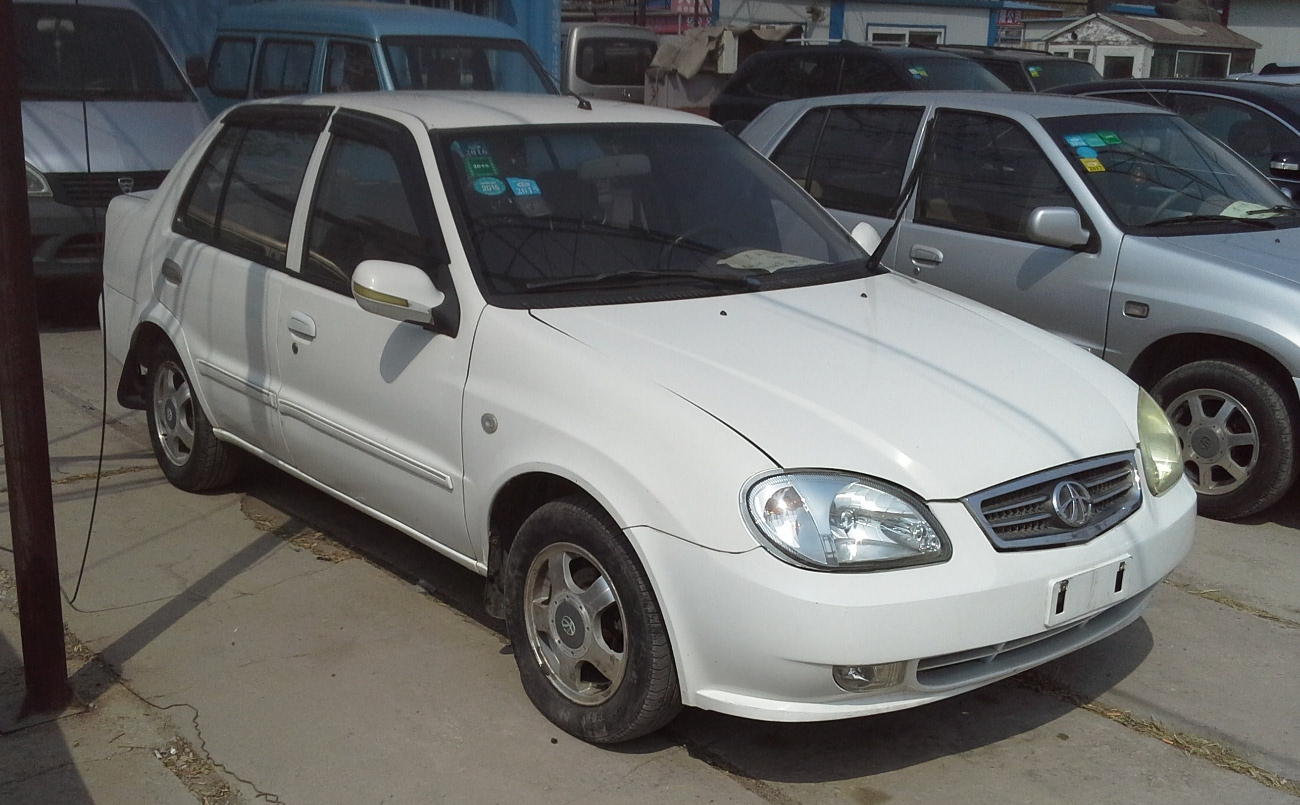
2004–2011 Tianjin Xiali N3 sedan

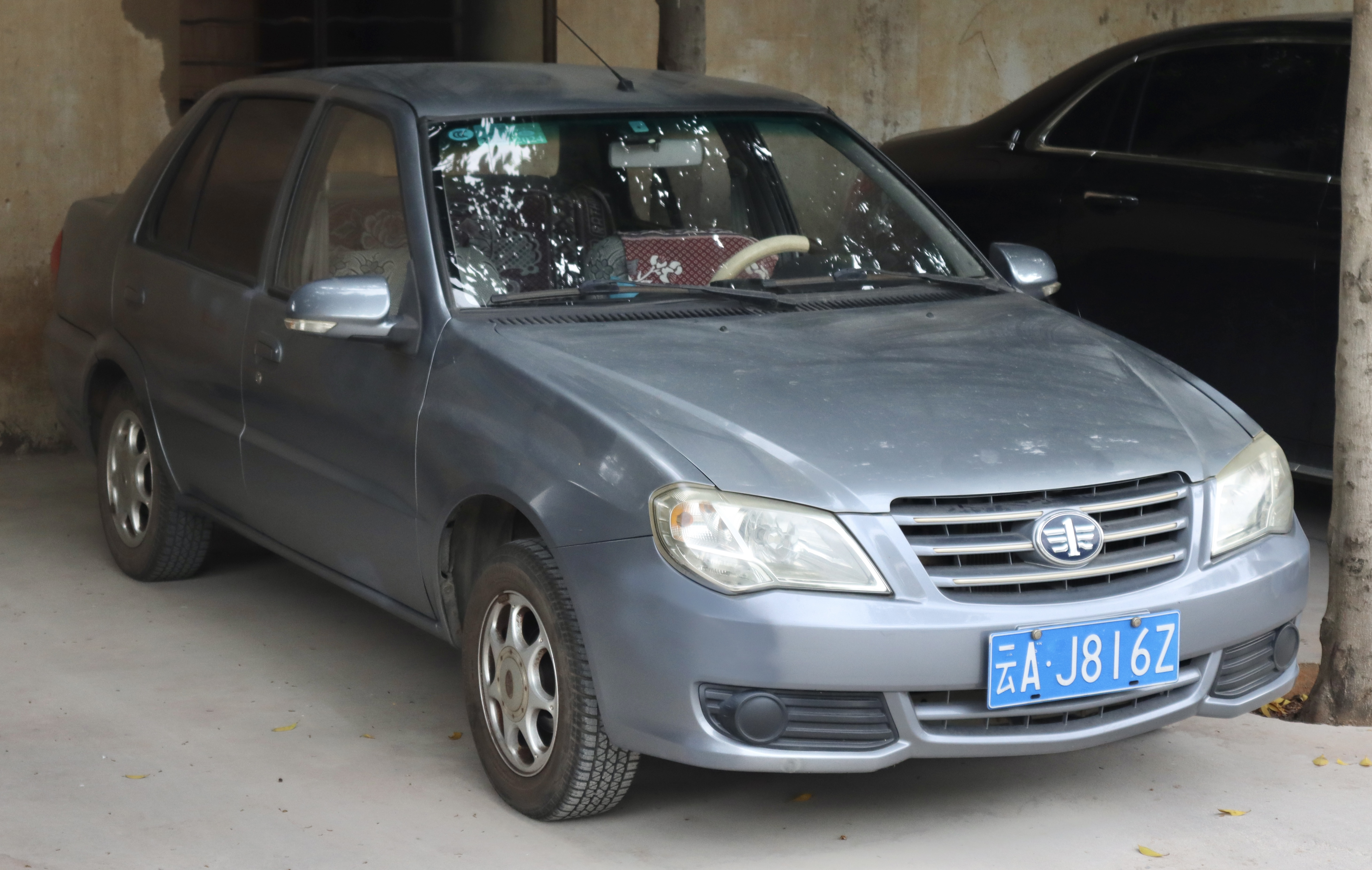
2010–2012 Tianjin Xiali N3 sedan

Chinese brand Ling Kong made a series of cars based on the Tianjin Xiali in exterior design and was known as the KJ6380. Available as a sedan, notchback and hatchback, the KJ6380 was available with three one litre four-cylinder engines known as the JL462, DA462 and 377Q-L. All variants were equipped with a 4-speed manual gearbox as standard. For the sedan, it has a 3800 millimetre length, 1510 millimetre width, 1480 millimetre height and sits on a 2460 millimetre wheelbase. Production started in 1988 and ended in 1995 after the company merged with Sanjiu Auto.

Another manufacturer based in Anhui called Anda'er made an MPV variant of the Xiali in 1996 known as the Anda'er AAQ 6370 along with other cars. The 1-litre TJ376QE engine came standard paired with a 4 speed manual gearbox. The MPV is 3750 millimetres long, 1580 millimetres wide, 1770 millimetres high and runs on a 2300 millimetre wheelbase. Kerb weight is 950 kilograms. The MPV was given a facelift in 2001 featuring a new set of lights and dashboard then ended production in 2003.

Chinese car brand China Motor Corporation, based in Beijing, made a car known as the Zhonghua with the codename CHB6401TA and was designed by Chinese designer Tang Jinsheng, with the body shape of made entirely out of plastic and was a licensed-built Tianjin Xiali derivative. An 800 cc three cylinder engine came standard producing 55 horsepower and 76 newton metres of torque paired to a 5 speed manual gearbox. Production for the Zhonghua started in 1996 and ended in 1999.

Geely also made a series cars based on the Xiali which were licensed by FAW Tianjin known as the Liangjing JL6360E1 for the hatchback, sold from 1998 to 2004, the Haoqing SRV and Pride station wagon, sold from 2002 to 2005 and 2002 to 2007 respectively, the Merrie (吉利美日)/MR303 notchback, sold from 2003 to 2006 and the Uliou (优利欧) sedan sold from 2003 to 2005. A pickup variant was introduced in 2001 and was known as JL1010N sold up to 2005. A panel van variant known as the JL5010X was sold from 2001 to 2004 which was replaced by the JL1010E1 and was sold from 2005 to 2007.

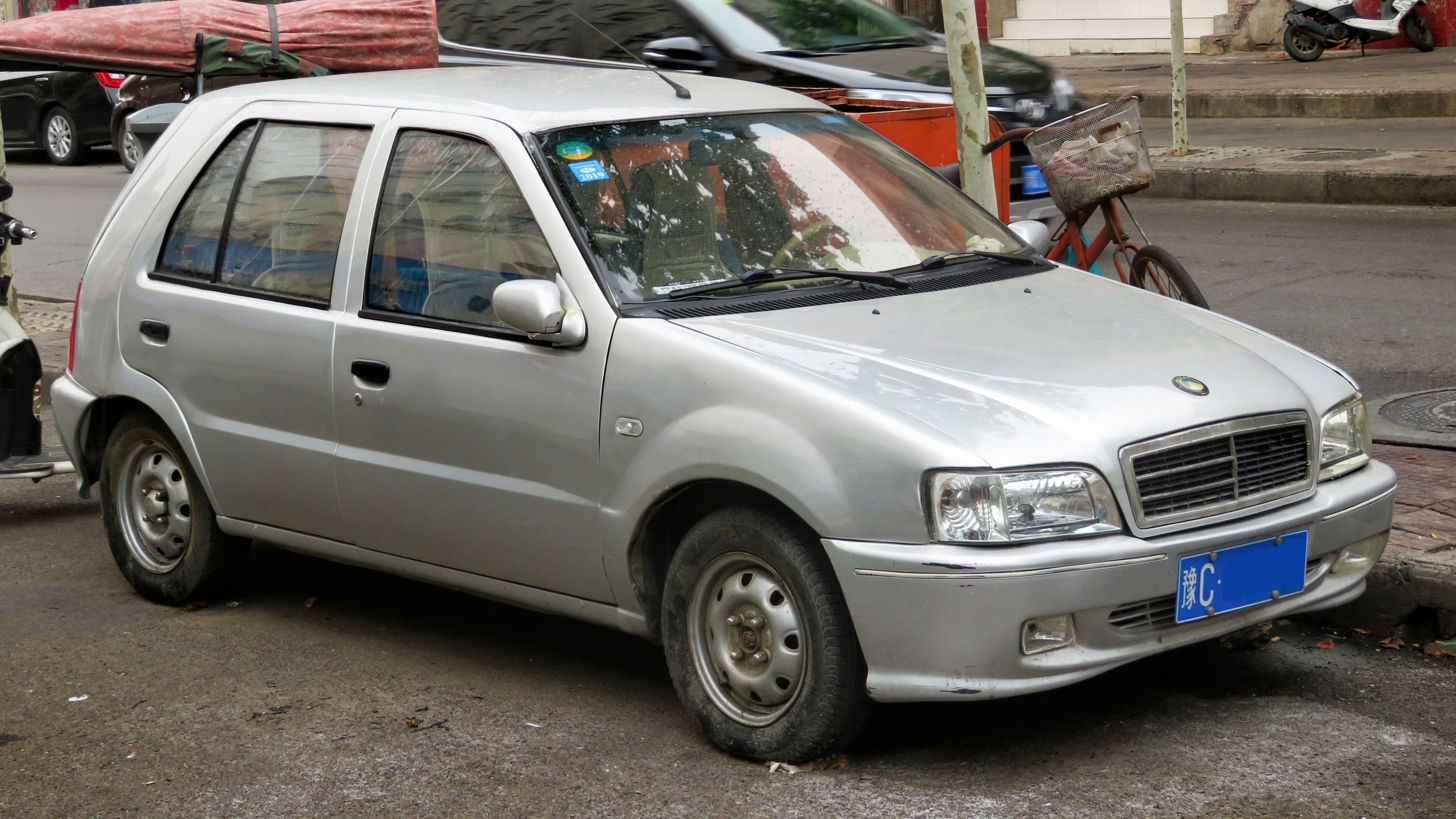
1998–2004 Geely Liangjing/Haoqing JL6360E1 (hatchback)

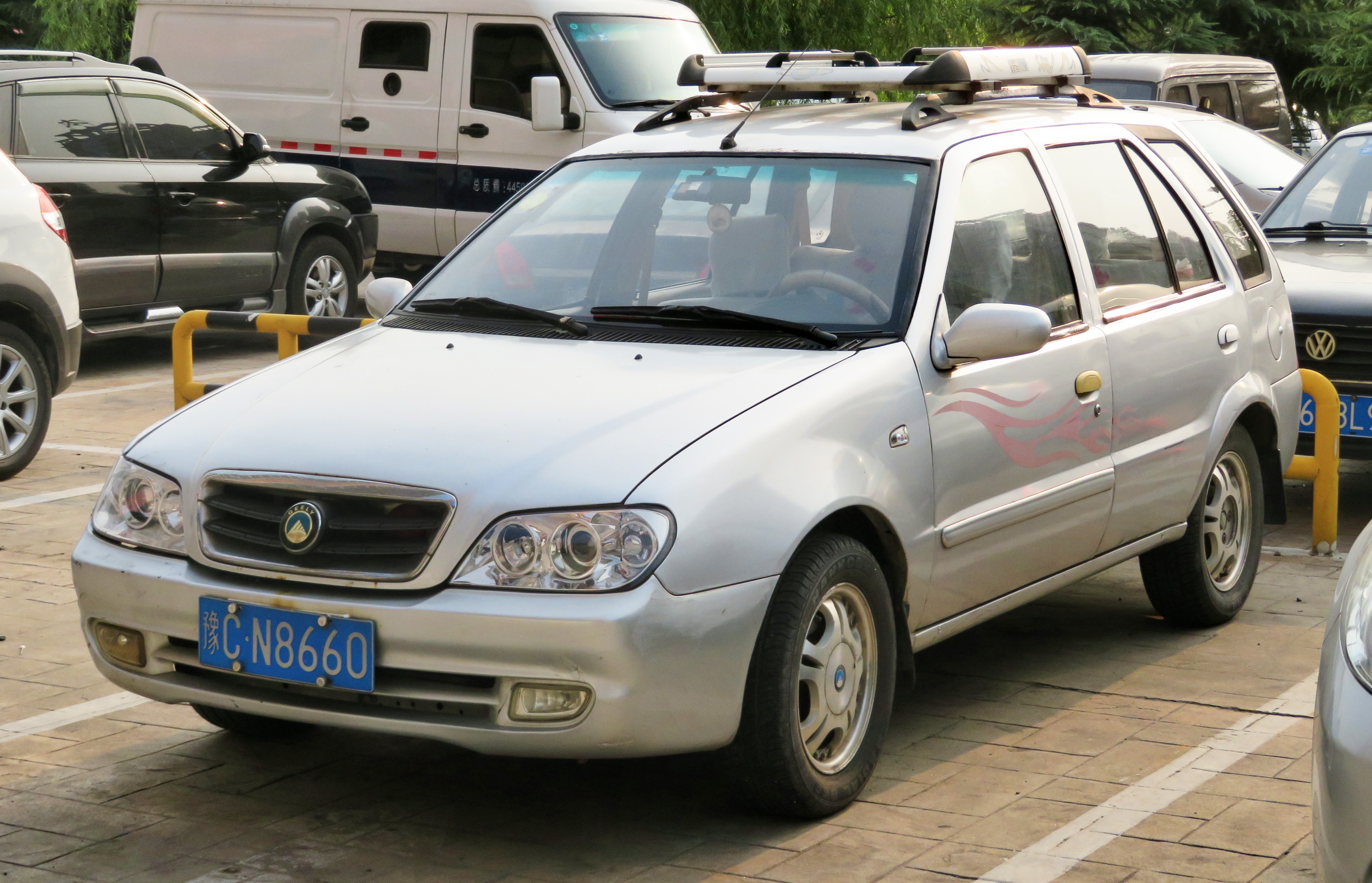
2004 Geely Haoqing (HQ) S-RV HQ7130B1

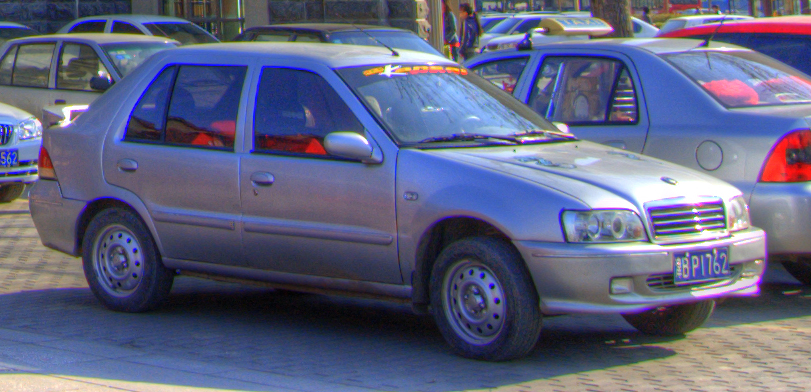
2003–2006 Geely Merrie notchback

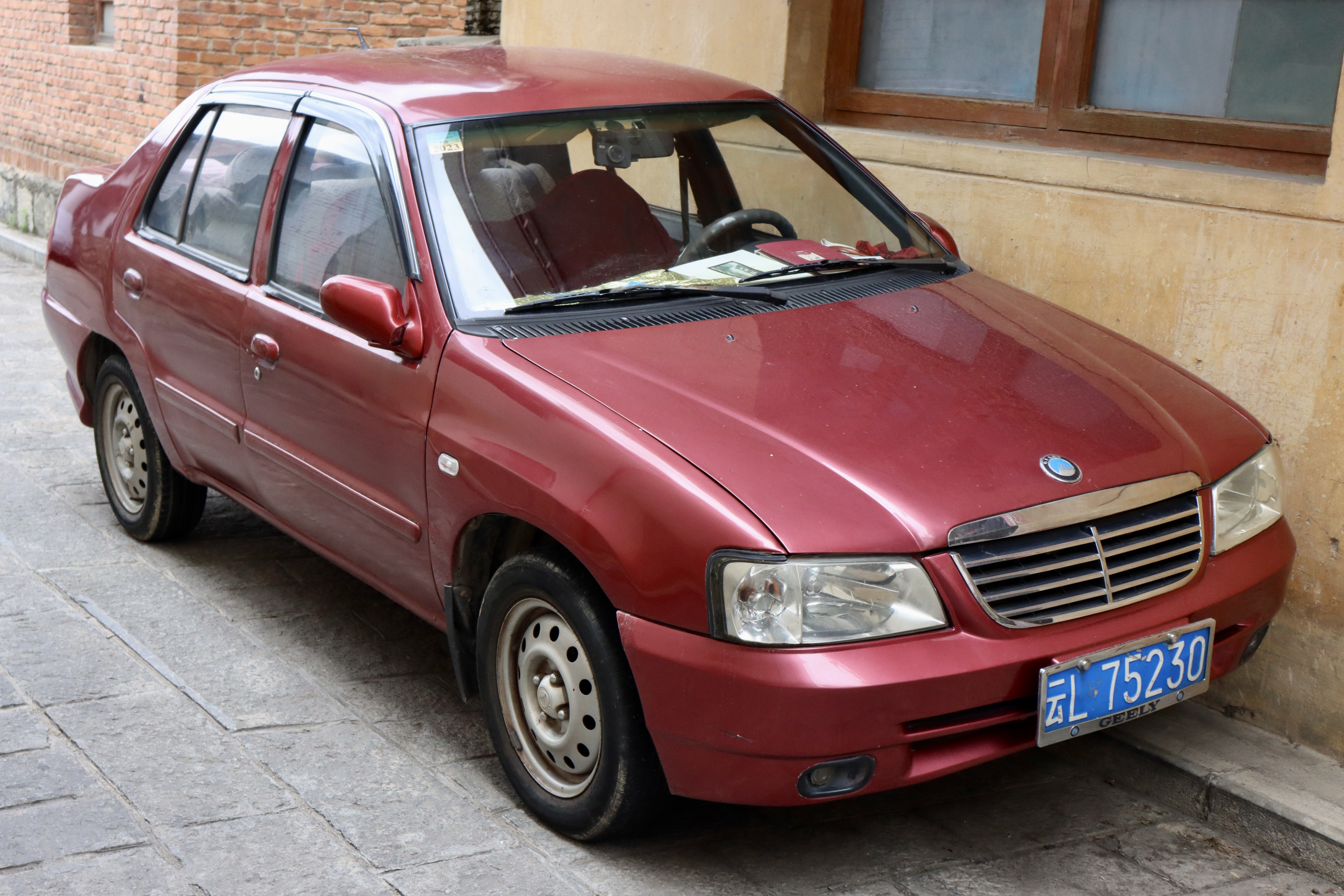
2003–2005 Geely Merrie sedan
