= Perodua Rusa =

Malaysian cab over microvan

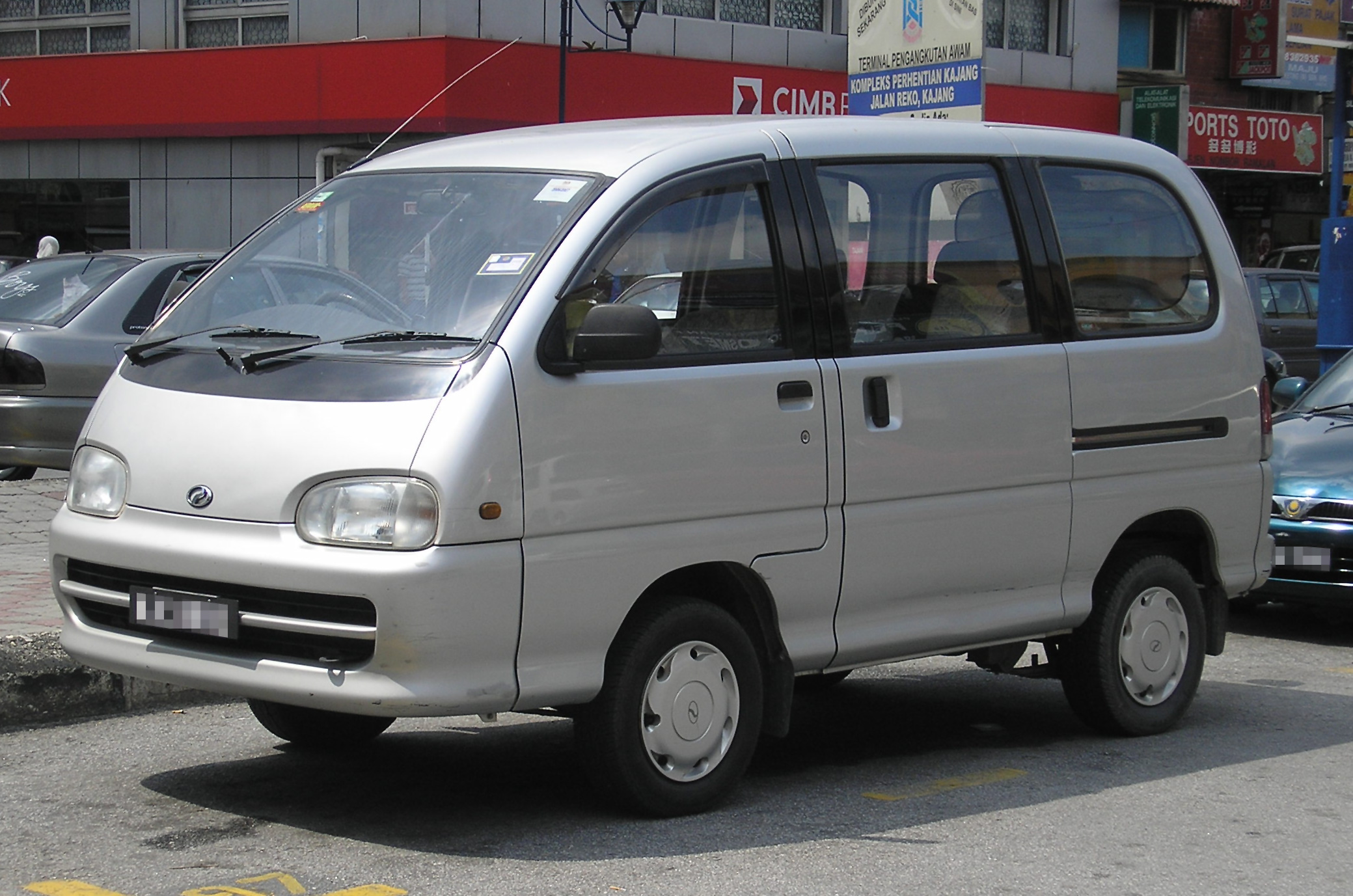

Overview
- Manufacturer: Perodua
- Production: 1996–2007

Body and chassis
- Class: Microvan
- Body style: 5-door van
- Platform: Front mid-engine, rear-wheel-drive
- Related: Daihatsu Zebra (S90)

Powertrain
- Engine: petrol: 1.3 L HC-C/E I4; 1.6 L HD-C/E I4

Dimensions
- Wheelbase: 2,080 mm (81.9 in)
- Length: 3,880 mm (152.8 in)
- Width: 1,560 mm (61.4 in)
- Height: 1,845 mm (72.6 in)
- Curb weight: 935–1,145 kg (2,061–2,524 lb)

The Perodua Rusa is a cab over microvan manufactured by the Malaysian automaker Perodua between 1996 and 2007, and based on the Daihatsu Zebra. Launched on March 6, 1996, the Rusa is the first van model to be produced by a Malaysian automotive company. The original model received a 1.3-litre engine, complemented by a 1.6-litre model in May 1997.

== Etymology ==
The vehicle's name "Rusa" is the Malay translation of "Deer". Later replaced by the Perodua logo, the van's original logo was a galloping deer.

== History ==
Perodua Rusa received almost 3,000 bookings on its launch day. At launch, Rusa was priced between RM 34,000 for the standard model and RM 39,200 for the deluxe models.

== Models ==
Three variations of the Rusa vans were offered: The CX (1.3-litre, two-seat version), the EX (1.3 litre, five-seat version) and the GX (1.6-litre, seven-seat version). The CX is primarily intended to serve as a cargo vehicle, while the EX and GX are intended for private use. The van is also used by Malaysian police and fire fighting forces. The engines were both of Daihatsu origins, from that company's H engine family.

== Specifications ==
Data		CX	EX	GX
Overall Length/Width/Height (mm)		3880/1560/1845		
Wheelbase (mm)		2080		
Track	Front (mm)	1340		
Track	Rear (mm)	1330		
Minimum Road Clearance (mm)		170		
Kerb Weight (kg)		935	1140	1145
Gross Vehicle Weight (kg)		1600		
Seating Capacity		2	5	7
Min. Turning Radius (m)		4.2		
Engine Type		HD-C petrol engine, water-cooled, in-line 4-cylinder,		
Engine Type		4-cycle, 16V, SOHC		
Total displacement		1296		1590
Bore X stroke		76 x 71.4		76 x 87.6
Max. Output (EEC)		73 PS (54 kW) at 6000 rpm		82 PS (60 kW) at 5600 rpm
Max. torque (EEC)		92 N⋅m (68 lb⋅ft) at 3200 rpm		115 N⋅m (85 lb⋅ft) at 3200 rpm
Compression ratio		9.5 : 1		
Clutch		Dry single plate with diaphragm		
Transmission		5 M/T		
Transmission Gear Ratio		1st: 4.059, 2nd: 2.045, 3rd: 1.376, 4th: 1.000. 5th: 0.838, Rev.: 4.12		
Final reduction gear ratio		4.875		4.222
Steering type		Rack-and-pinion Hydraulic power steering		
Main brakes	Front	Disc		
Main brakes	Rear	Leading-Trailing Drum		
Brake Booster Size (inch)		8		
Suspension	Front	MacPherson Strut		
Suspension	Rear	Leaf Spring		
Tyres		175/70R13		185/70R14
Fuel Tank Capacity (litre)		47		
Running Performance	Max. Speed (km/h/j)	133		143
Running Performance	0-400 (sec)	24.1		22.0
Fuel Consumption	90 km/h Constant	12.7		13.2
Fuel Consumption	Speed with 5th gear	12.7		13.2

== Gallery ==
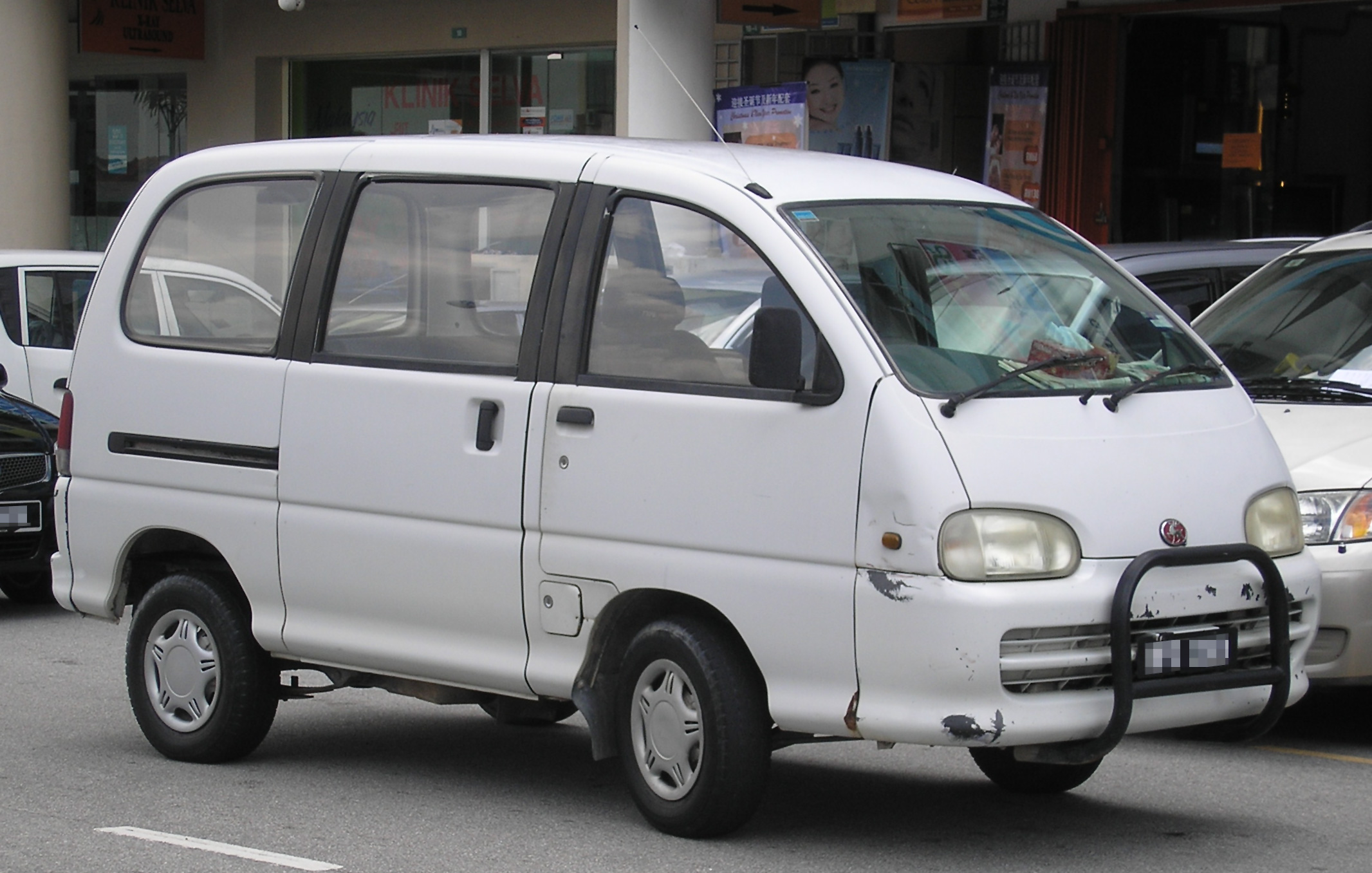
Front-side shot of a first generation Perodua Rusa (commercial variant), in Serdang, Selangor, Malaysia.

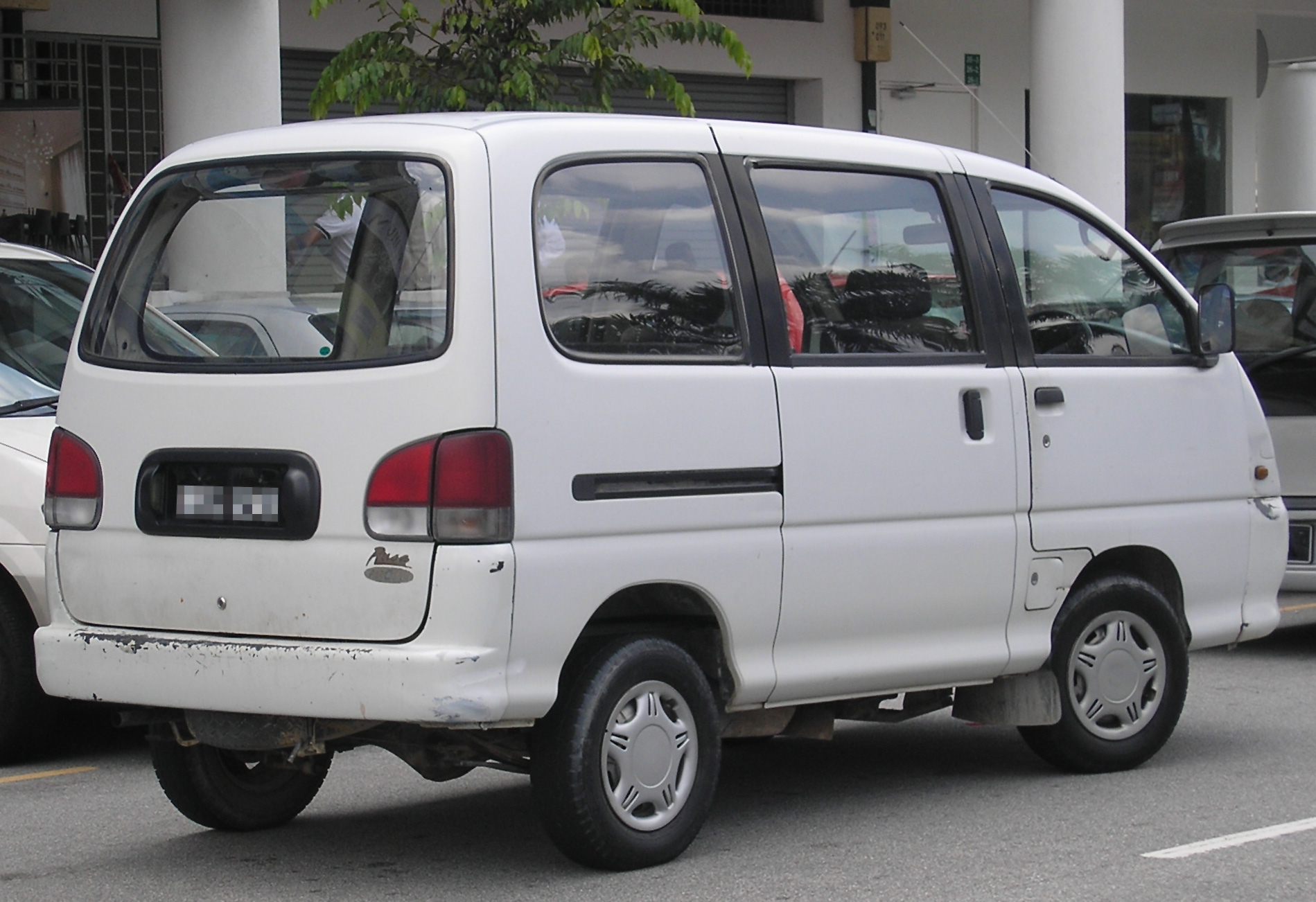
Rear-side shot of a first generation Perodua Rusa (commercial variant), in Serdang, Selangor, Malaysia.

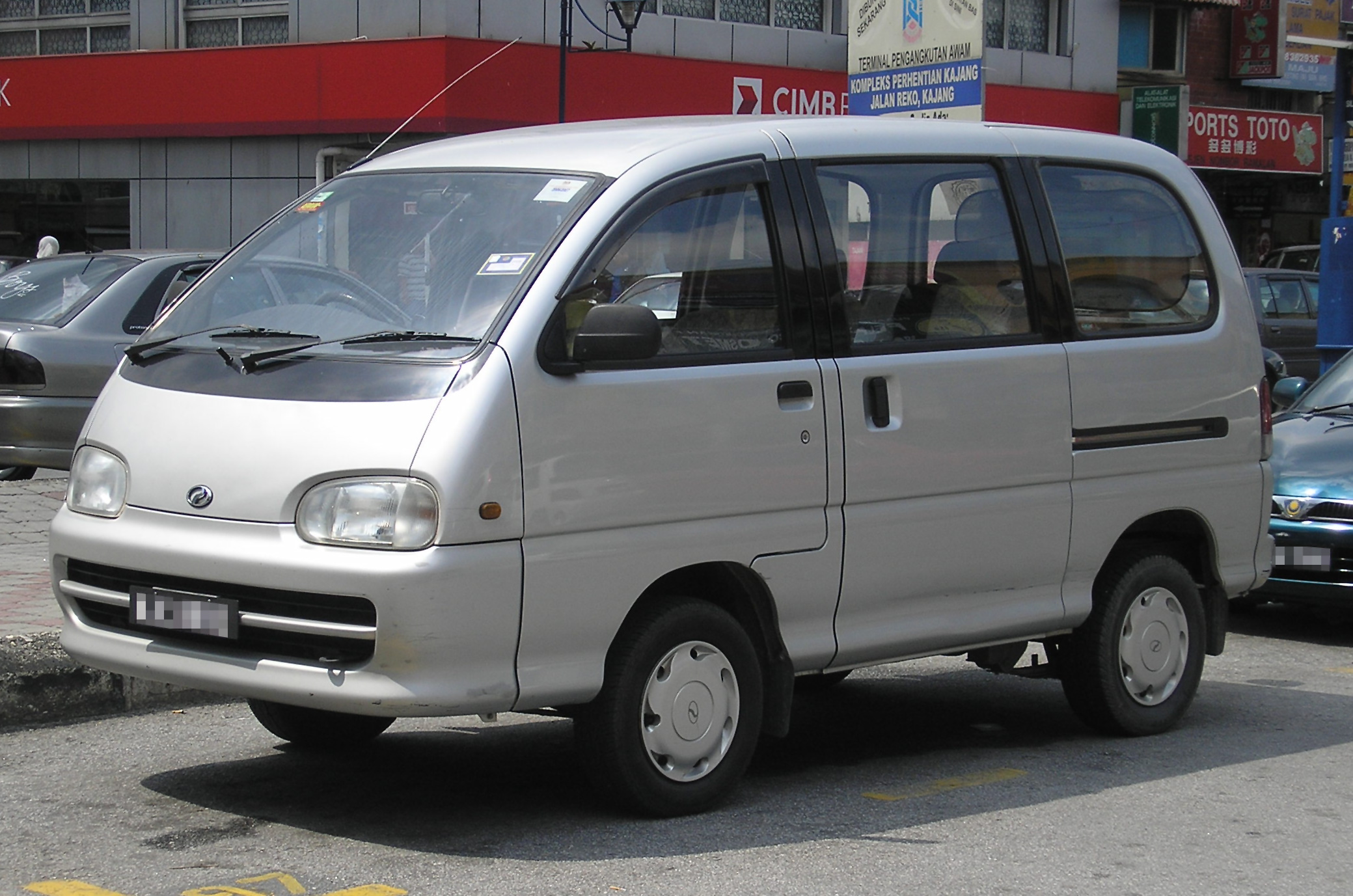
Front-side shot of a first generation Perodua Rusa EX (1.3), in Kajang, Selangor, Malaysia.

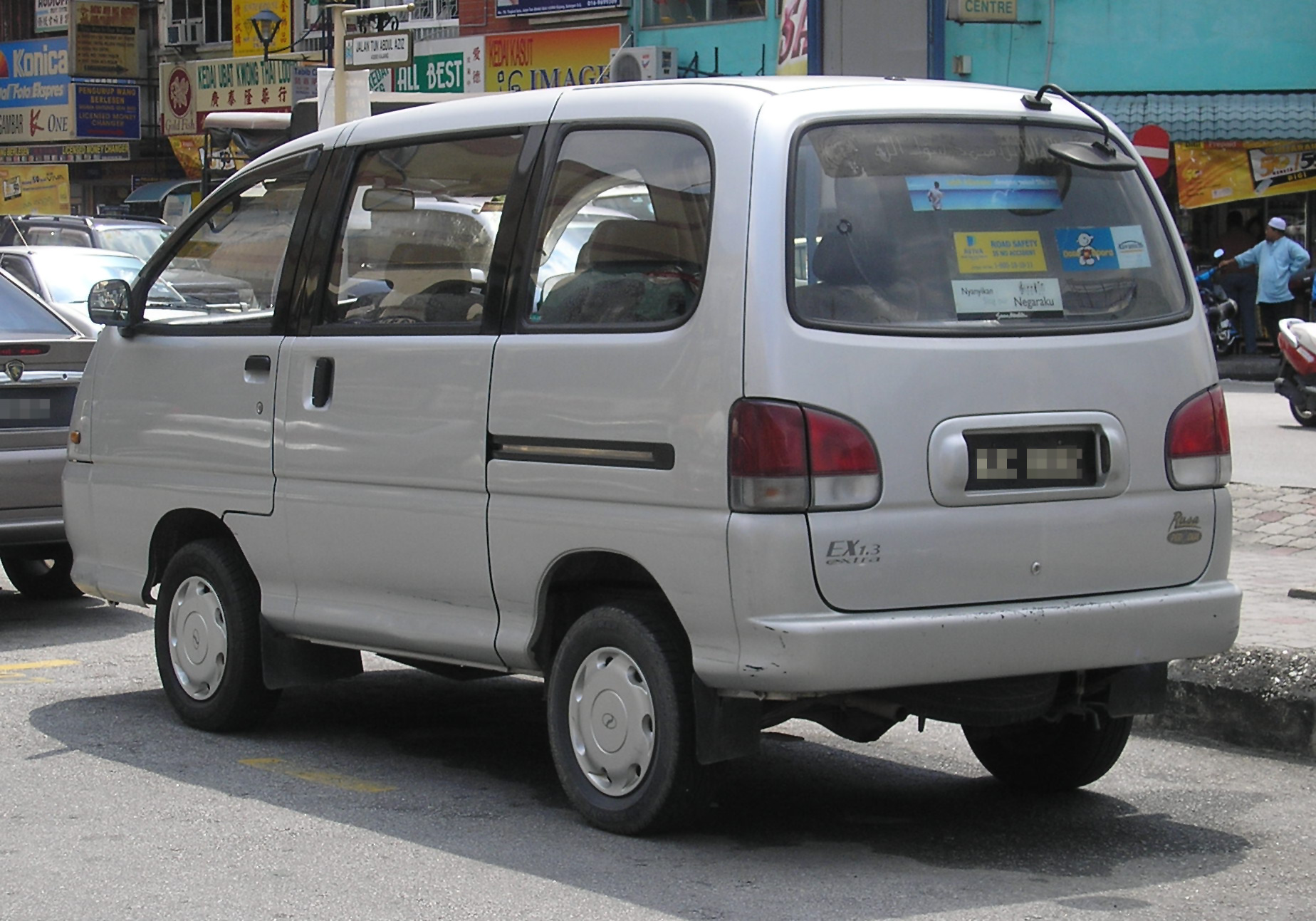
Rear-side shot of a first generation Perodua Rusa EX (1.3), in Kajang, Selangor, Malaysia.

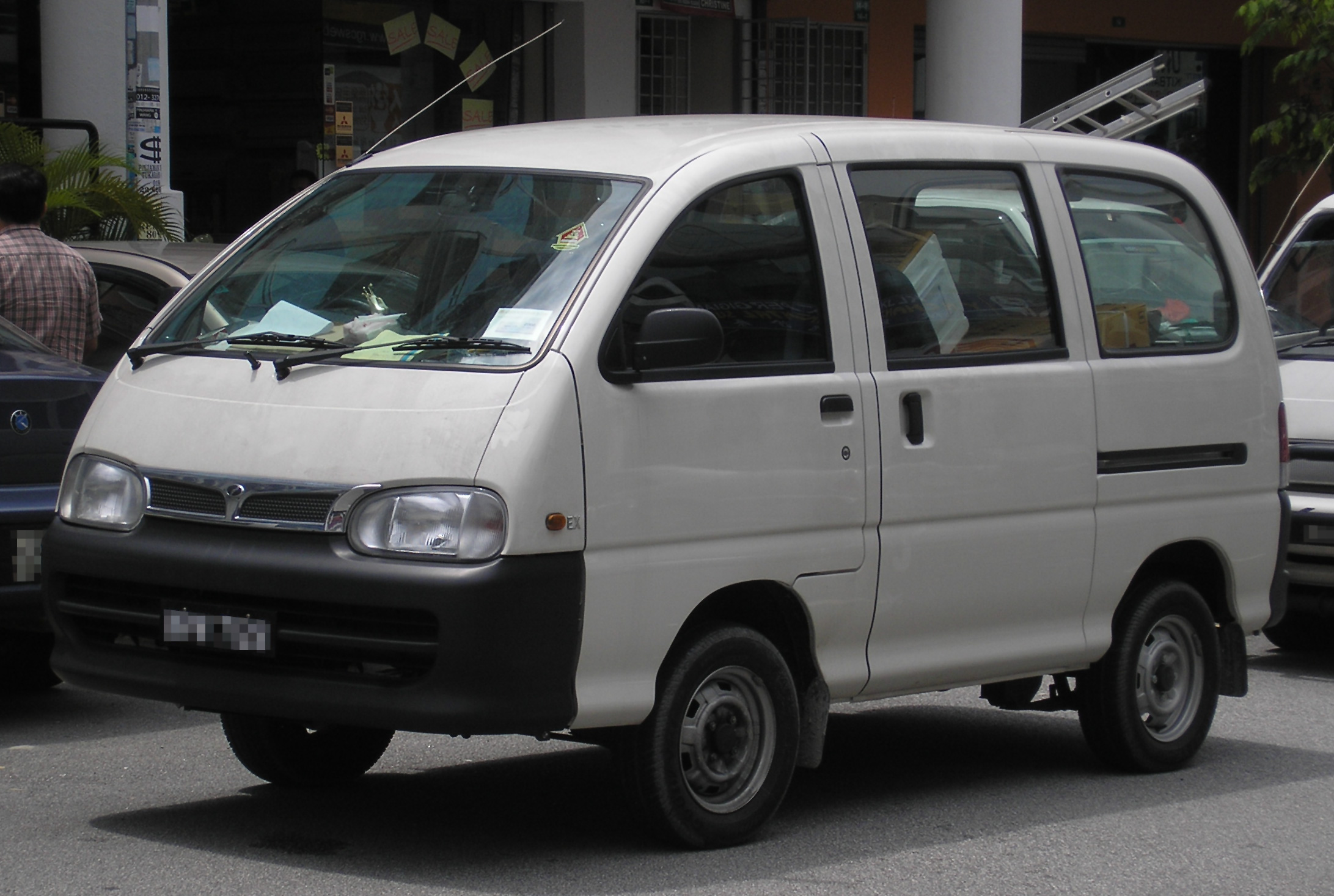
Front-side shot of a first generation, second facelift Perodua Rusa (commercial variant), in Serdang, Selangor, Malaysia.

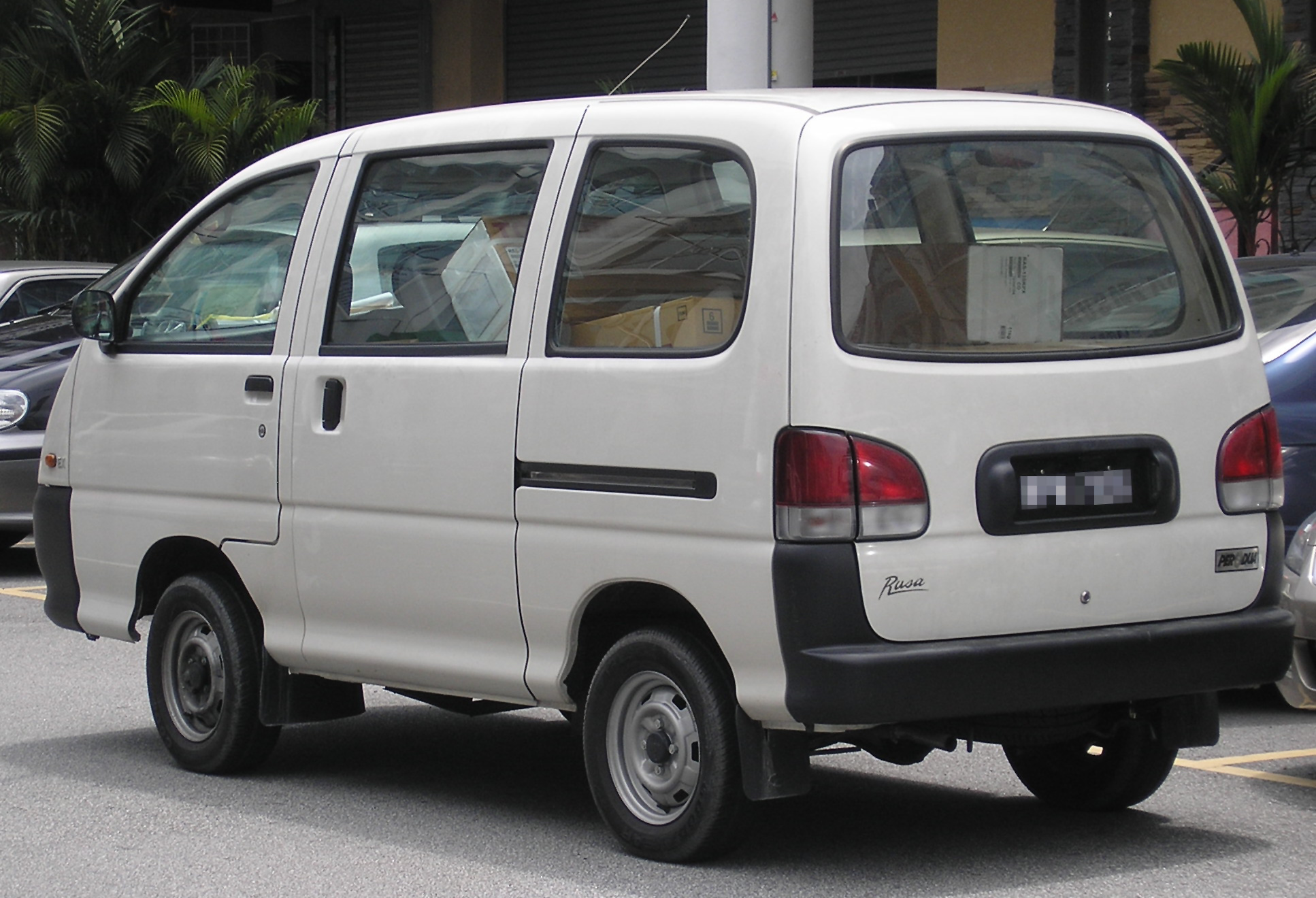
Rear-side shot of a first generation, second facelift Perodua Rusa (commercial variant), in Serdang, Selangor, Malaysia.

== Sales ==
Year	Malaysia (Note: Figures based on registration)
2000	2,341
2001	2,262
2002	2,296
2003	2,603
2004	1,342
2005	1,115
2006	416
2007	344
2008	62
