= Daihatsu Rocky (F300) =

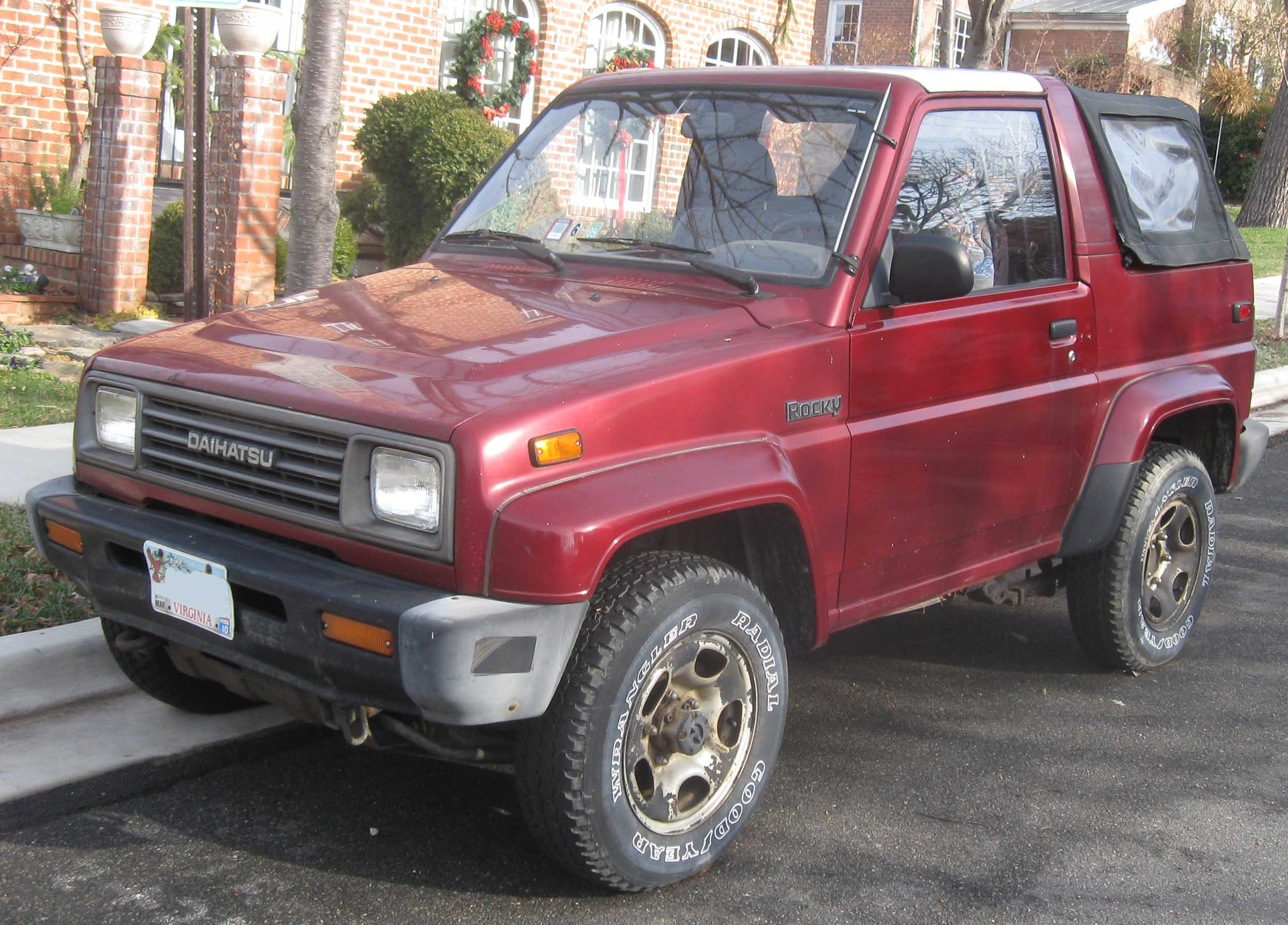

Overview
- Manufacturer: Daihatsu
- Also called: Daihatsu Feroza (Europe/Australia/Asia); Daihatsu Sportrak (UK)
- Production: 1989–2002

Body and chassis
- Class: Mini SUV
- Body style: 3-door SUV
- Layout: Front-engine, rear-wheel-drive; Front-engine, four-wheel-drive

Powertrain
- Engine: Petrol: 1.6 L HD-C I4; 1.6 L HD-E I4
- Transmission: 5-speed manual; 4-speed automatic

Dimensions
- Wheelbase: 2,175 mm (85.6 in)
- Length: 3,765–3,845 mm (148.2–151.4 in)
- Width: body: 1,580 mm (62.2 in) incl. mirrors: 1,740 mm (68.5 in)
- Height: 1,720–1,725 mm (67.7–67.9 in)

Chronology
- Successor: Daihatsu Terios; Daihatsu Rocky (A200)

The F300 series Daihatsu Rocky (Japanese: ダイハツ・ロッキー, Hepburn: Daihatsu Rokkī) is a mini SUV that was manufactured by the Japanese automaker Daihatsu between 1989 and 2002. It was gradually replaced by the introduction of the Terios in 1997.

== Name ==
The "Rocky" nameplate is used in Japan and some American countries. In Europe and Australia, the F300 series Rocky is known as the Daihatsu Feroza, as the name "Rocky" was used for the larger F70 series Rugger/Fourtrak in most countries. The name "Feroza" is also used in Latin America and Asia. In Indonesia, the "Feroza" name was used instead for the petrol-engined rear-wheel drive version of the Rugger (called "Taft" there). The F300 series Rocky was also marketed as the Daihatsu Sportrak in the UK.

To avoid confusion, owners often refer to the models by their factory model number F300 or F310. The F310 variant, marketed as the "MkII Sportrak" or "Feroza II" featured a flared guards to accommodate a wider track than the F300 model. The F310 variant was released in 1992, before the later facelift. It had widened suspension, including differentials and rear leaf springs. The body was kept the same, except for the wider fender flares and the concealed rear wheel arches, covered by these flares. After this facelift, both the F300 and F310 variations were kept, with differing trim levels and interior design. This is most notable on the materials, colour and pattern of the seats.

== Overview ==
The Rocky is powered by a 1.6-litre HD-C/HD-E SOHC 16-valve four-cylinder petrol engine shared with the Applause. This is linked via a manual or Aisin automatic transmission, propshaft and differential to the front wheels and rear axle to provide either four-wheel drive or rear-wheel drive depending on the driver requirement. 2WD, 4WD Low and 4WD High modes are selected using a selector next to the gear stick in the cabin. Full-time 4WD with lockable inter-axle differential version were available, but without a low gear in transfer case. Power ranged between 55–77 kW (74–103 hp; 75–105 PS) in Japan. It was available with a three-door bodystyle only, and was one of the first mini SUVs introduced by Japanese manufacturers during the 1980s. The Rocky was one of two models, alongside the Charade, to be sold in the United States during Daihatsu's brief presence in that market.

In Europe, Latin America, Australia and most Asian markets, the F300 model was sold as the Feroza. "Feroza" is a made-up name, a combination of "ferocious" and the name "Rosa". The export models were usually fitted with a detuned version of the more powerful fuel injected engine, with 70 kW (94 hp; 95 PS) at 5,700 rpm. There was also a carburetted version in export trim, producing 63 kW (84 hp; 86 PS) at 6,000 rpm.

The multi-point fuel-injected engine was available in Australia. The Australian Feroza II SXP variant was available in 1993 although the carburetted model was dropped from the Japanese lineup, with only the 70 / 77 kW (94 / 103 hp; 95 / 105 PS) engine remaining in the lineup. The Rocky/Feroza was gradually replaced in 1998 by the J100 series Terios.

The F300 series Rocky/Feroza underwent some very minor facelifts during its production, mostly limited to different grilles with early cars having a chromed unit. The taillights were mounted in the bodywork, but some cars had blinds in these spaces and instead carried their taillights in an enlarged rear bumper. This was due to legislation introduced in some markets regarding the rear pivot door.

In 1990, an electrically-powered version called the "Rocky EV" was developed together with the Kansai Electric Power Company, who also purchased 26 of them. Its 20 kW (27 hp; 27 PS) electrical motor could propel the Rocky up to 90 km/h (56 mph) and gave a 200 km (124 mi) range at a steady speed of 40 km/h (25 mph). The four-wheel drive system remained, allowing it to climb a 21 percent slope.

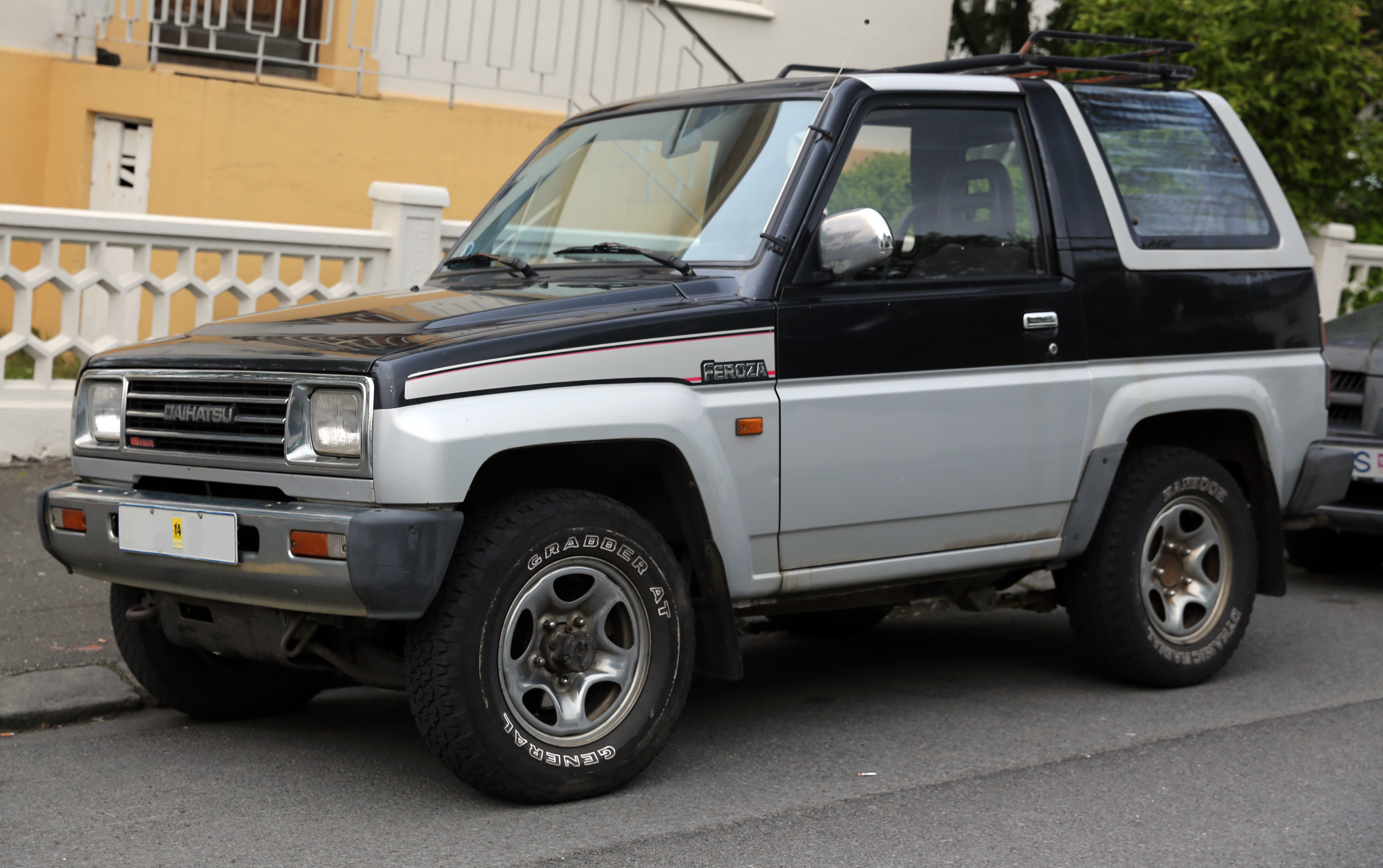
1990 Daihatsu Feroza 1.6 EL-II (F300; pre-facelift, Iceland)

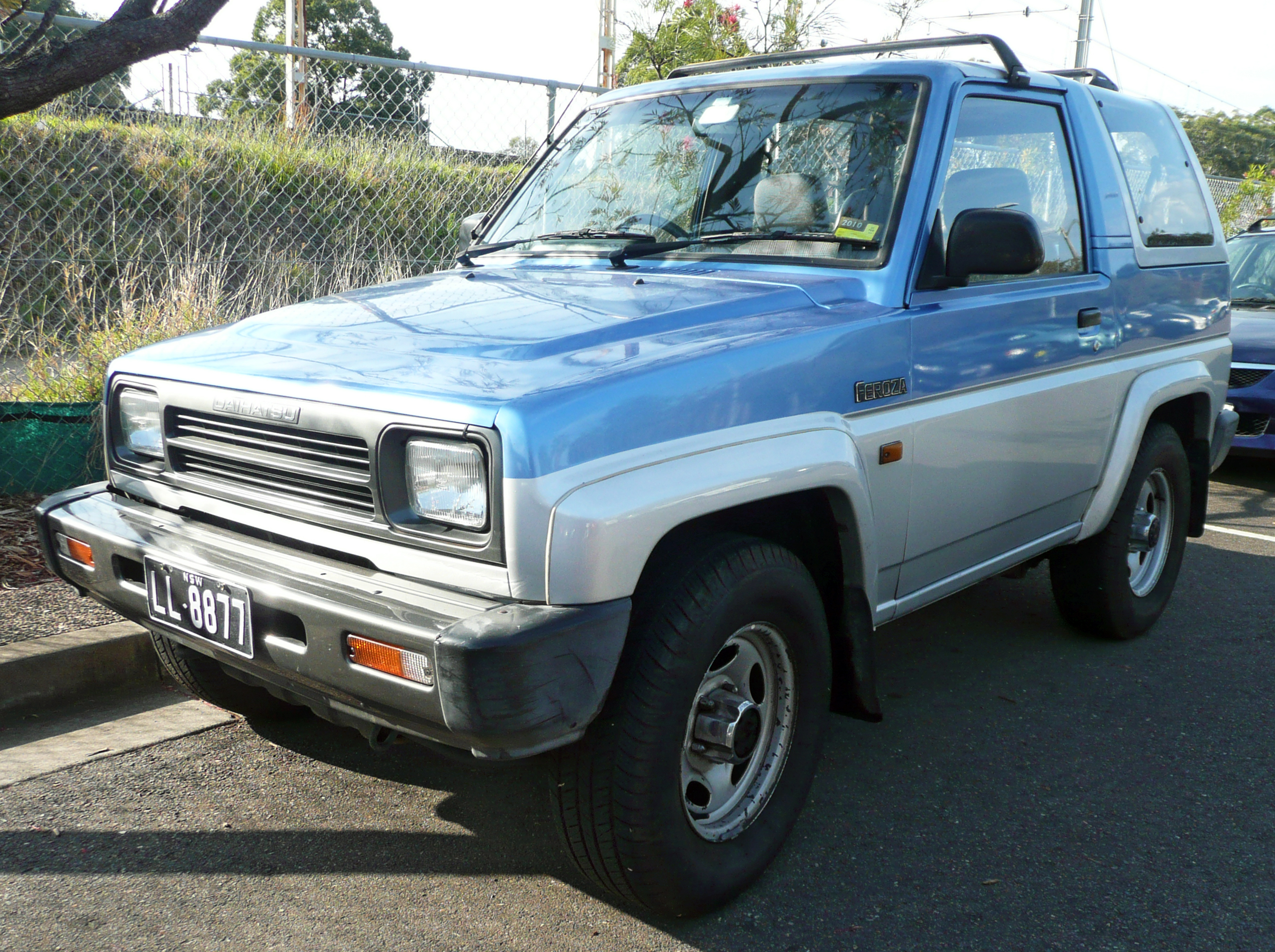
1992–1993 Feroza SE hardtop (F300GD; first facelift, Australia)

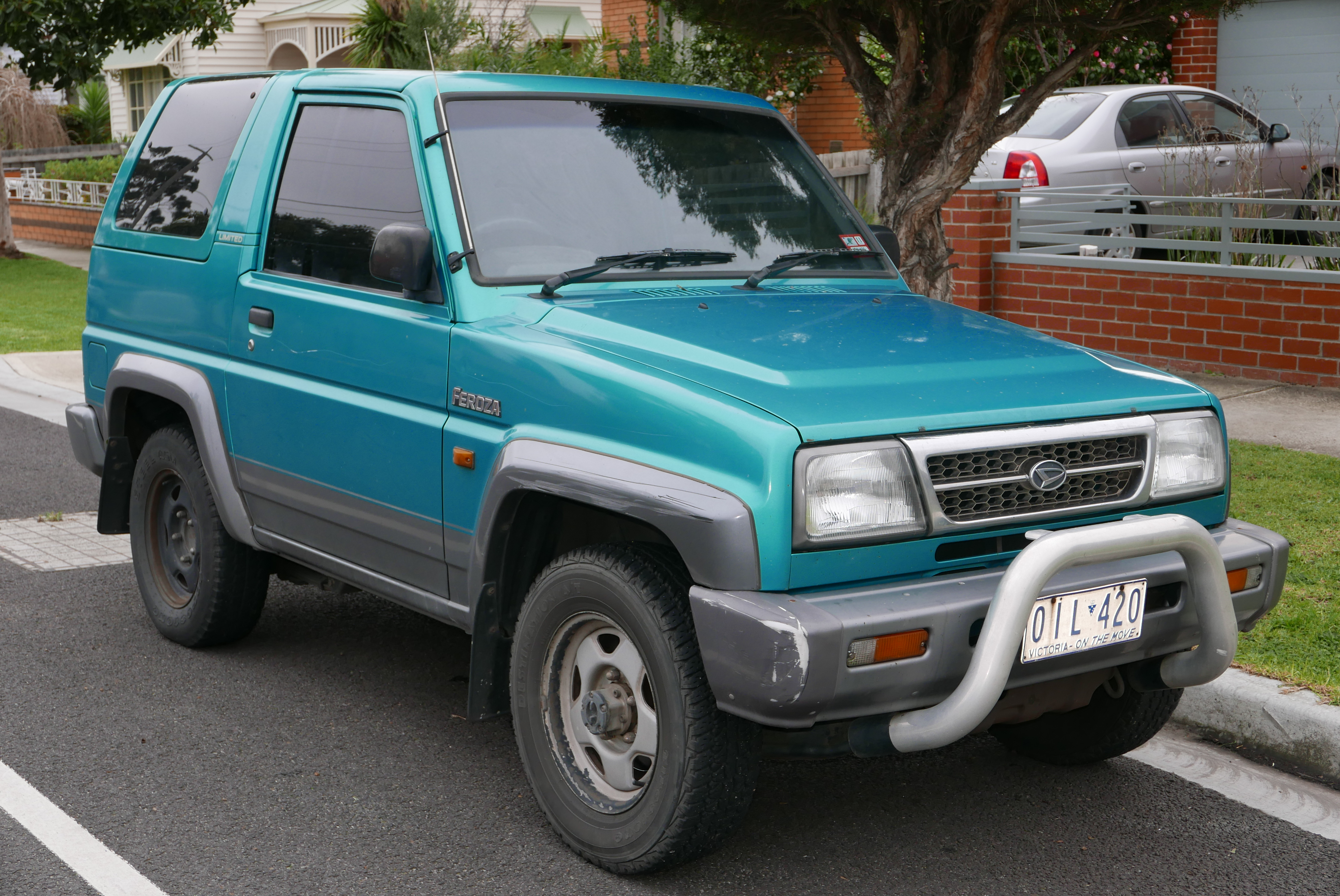
1997 Feroza Limited hardtop (F300B; second facelift, Australia)

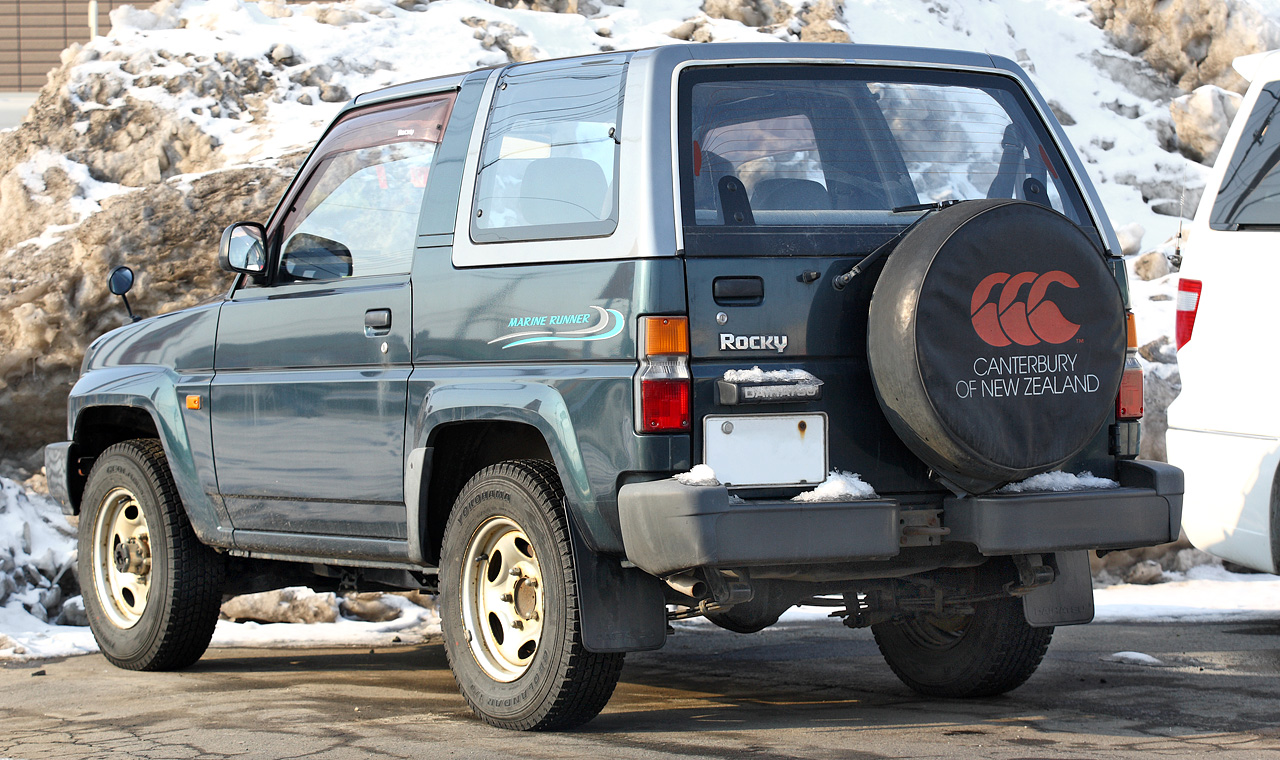
Rocky (Japan)

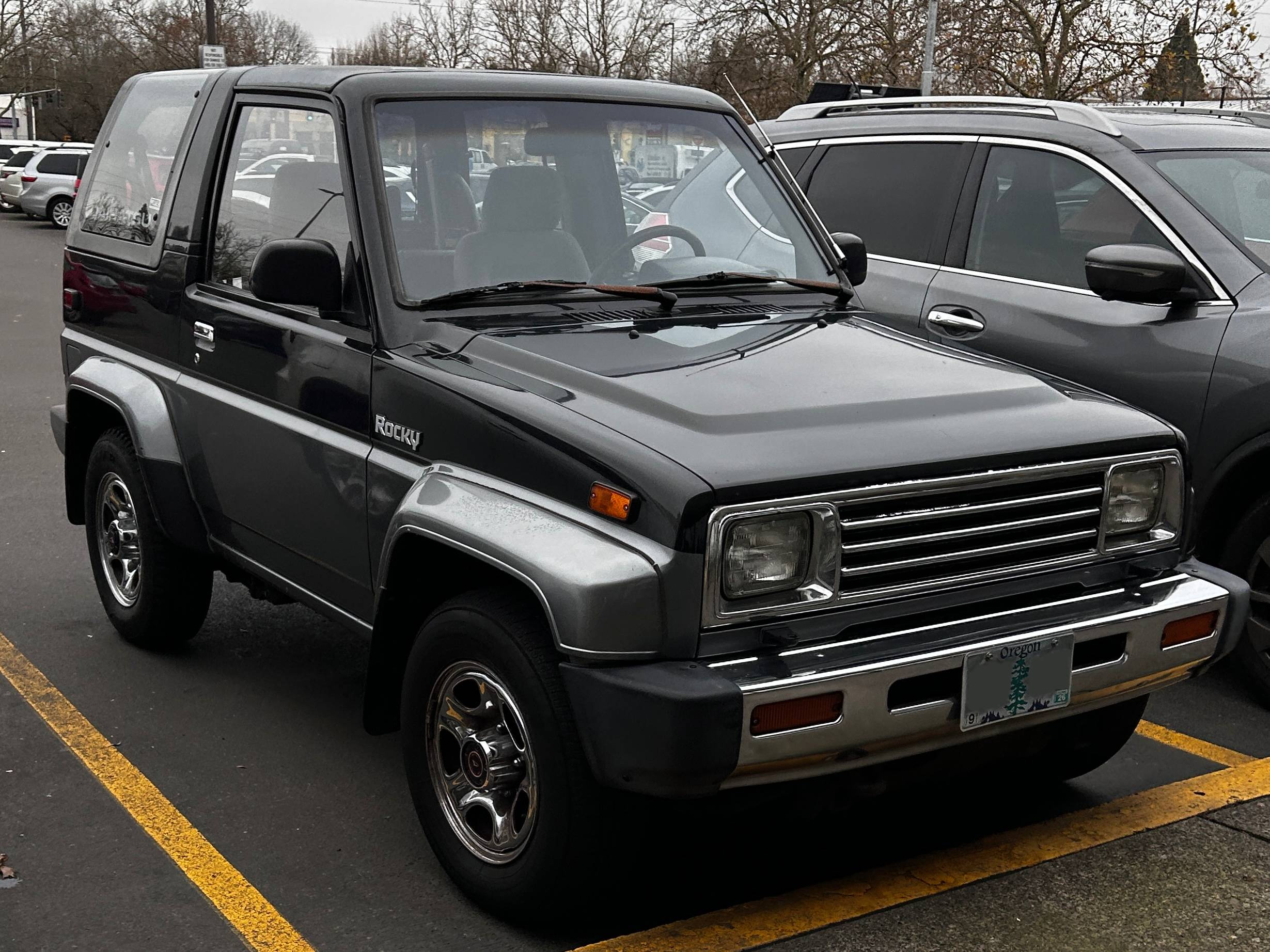
1992 Rocky SX (pre-facelift, US)

== Bertone Freeclimber II ==
Italian manufacturer Bertone built a variation of the Rocky/Feroza powered by a 1.6-litre BMW M40 engine, with 73.5 kW (99 hp; 100 PS), called the Bertone Freeclimber II. There was also a version called "Blue Lagoon", after a perfume by Nicolas de Barry. The Freeclimber was popular in France and Italy in particular, as it was unaffected by the quotas imposed on Japanese imports.

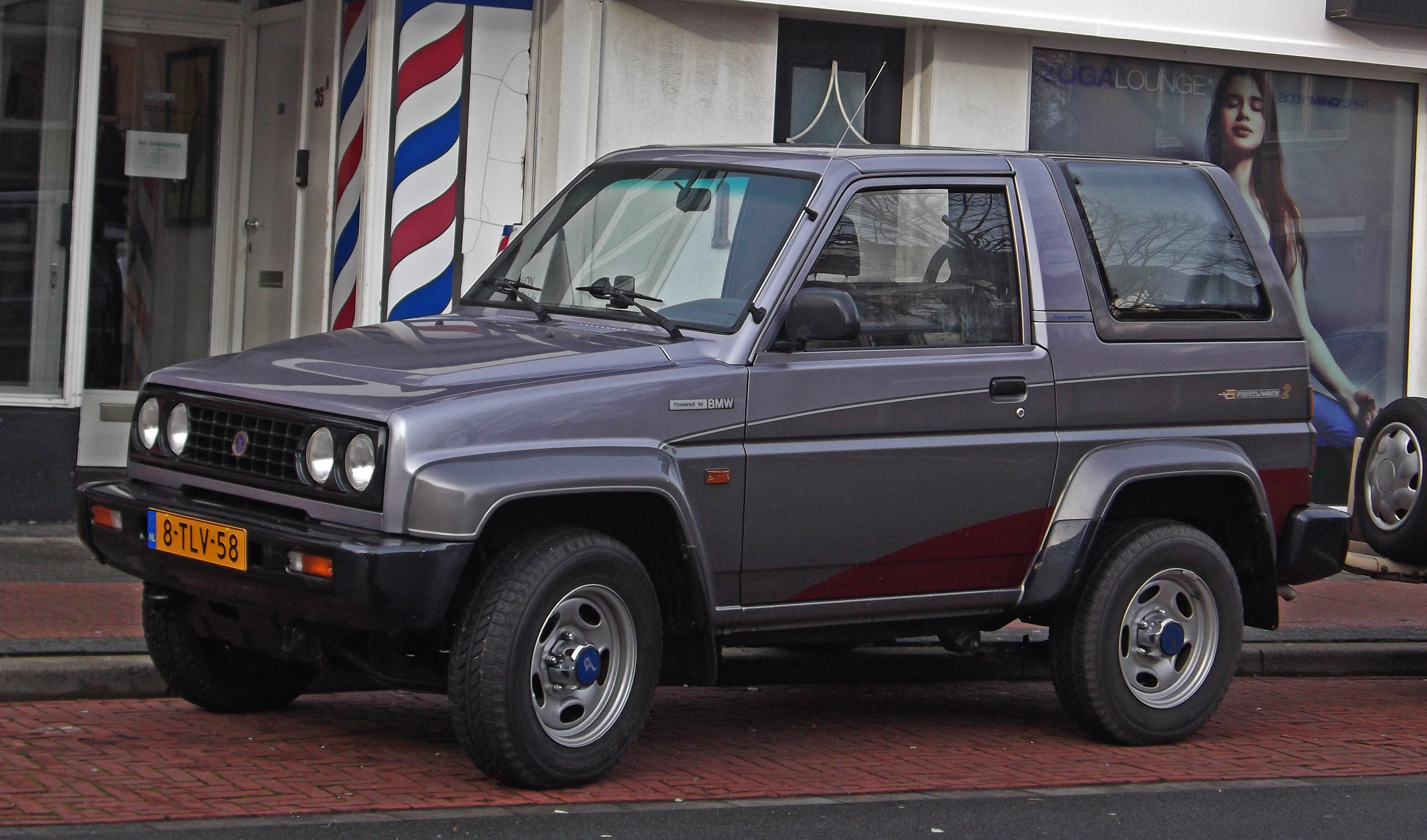
Bertone Freeclimber II

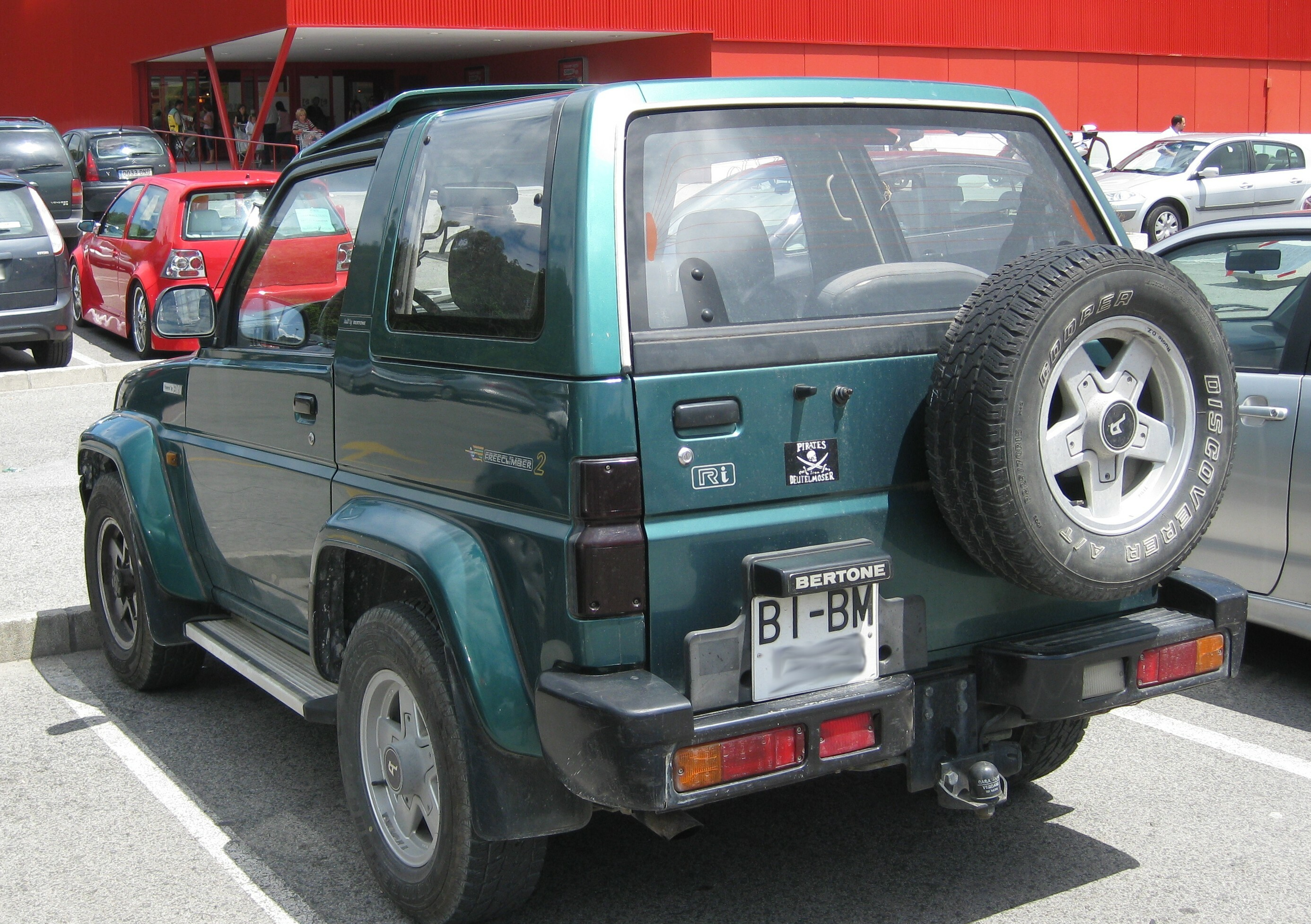
1992 Bertone Freeclimber II

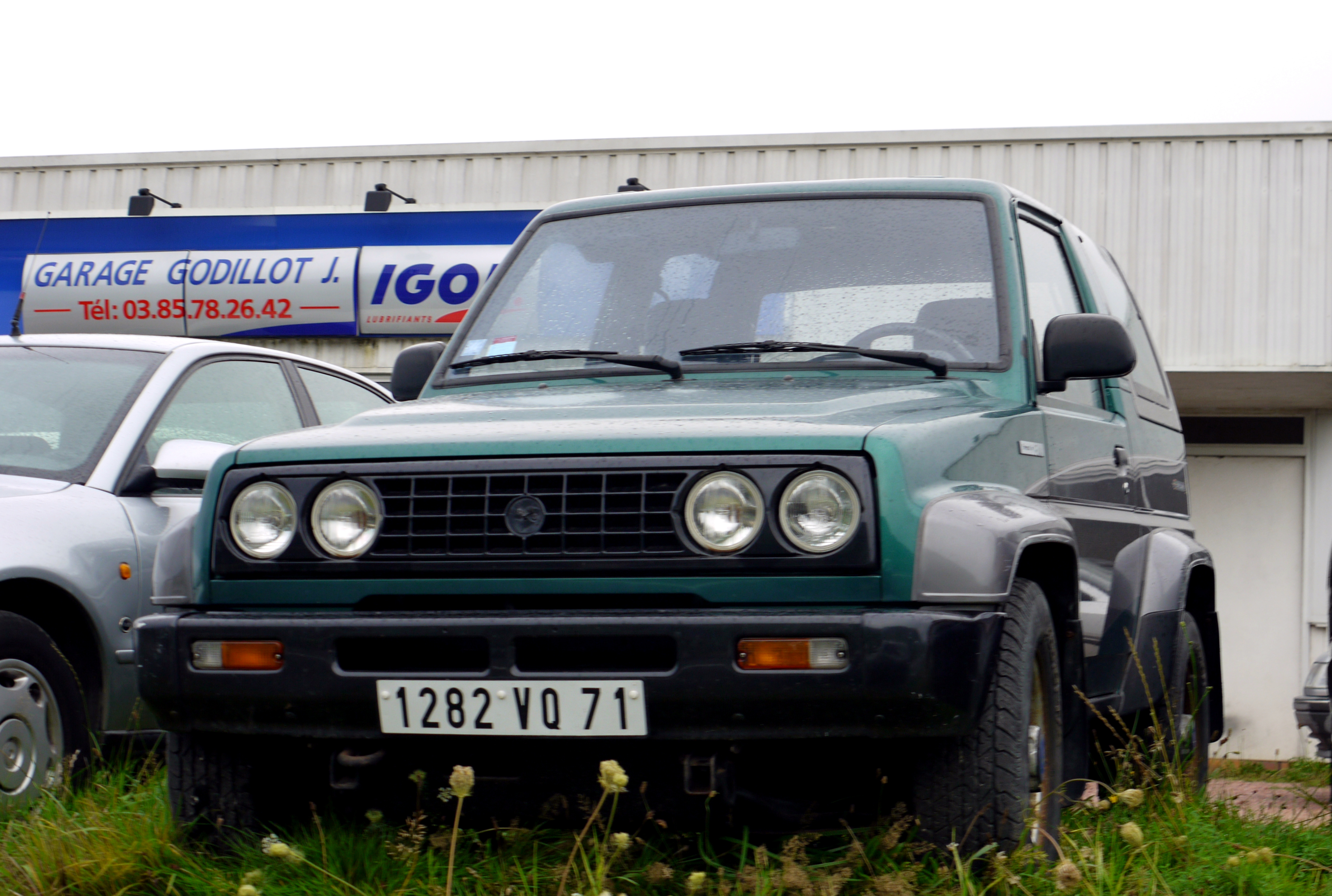
Bertone Freeclimber II Blue Lagoon
