= Daihatsu H-series engine =

Daihatsu H engine
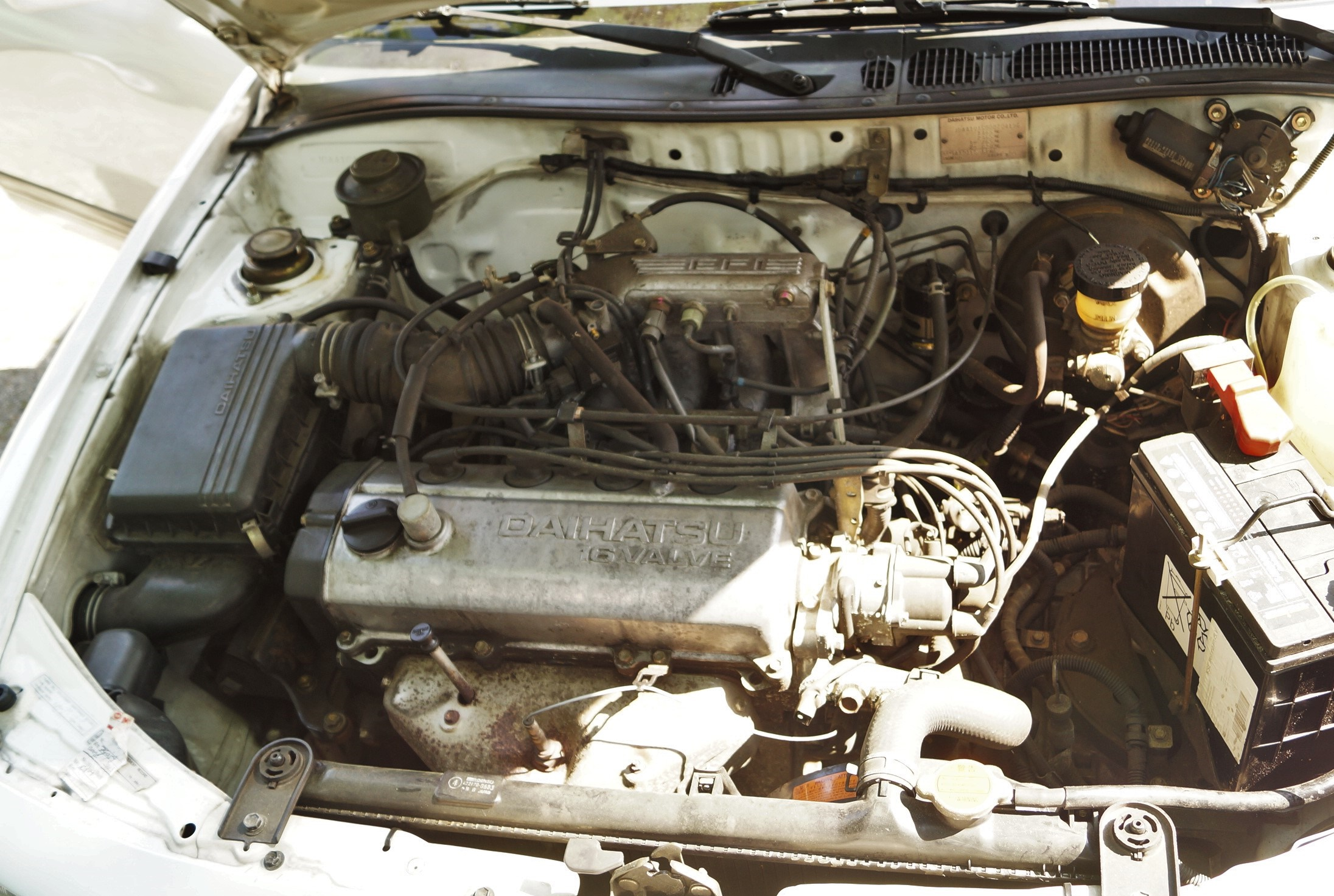
- Daihatsu 1.6 L HD-E engine

Overview
- Manufacturer: Daihatsu
- Production: 1987–2009

Layout
- Configuration: Inline-4 cylinder
- Displacement: 1.3 L (1,295 cc); 1.5 L (1,498 cc); 1.6 L (1,589 cc)
- Cylinder bore: 76.0 mm (2.99 in)
- Piston stroke: 71.4 mm (2.81 in); 82.6 mm (3.25 in); 87.6 mm (3.45 in)
- Cylinder block material: Aluminium
- Cylinder head material: Aluminium
- Valvetrain: SOHC 16-valve
- Compression ratio: 9.0–10.5:1

RPM range
- Max. engine speed: 6,000–6,500 rpm

Combustion
- Fuel system: Carburettor; Fuel injection
- Fuel type: Petrol
- Cooling system: Water-cooled

Output
- Power output: 73–125 PS (72–123 hp; 54–92 kW)
- Torque output: 95–144 N⋅m (9.7–14.7 kg⋅m; 70–106 lbf⋅ft)

Chronology
- Successor: Toyota SZ engine

The Daihatsu H-series engine is a range of four-stroke four-cylinder, internal combustion piston engines, designed by Daihatsu, which is a subsidiary of Toyota. These engines were produced from 1987 through 2009. Ranging from 1.3 L up to 1.6 L, these four-cylinder engines were built with lightness in mind, featuring a hollow crankshaft and camshaft, and the weight of a four-cylinder engine (1.3 L HC) is similar to the 1.0 L three-cylinder CB engines. The H-series engine has aluminium engine blocks and cylinder heads, timing belt driven heads, water-cooled engine cooling system, equipped with both carburetors (earlier models) and Multi-Point Fuel Injection (later models) and only available in 16-valve SOHC design.

== HC (1.3 L) ==
Based on the Japanese Wikipedia article

The engine first appeared in Daihatsu Charade G102/112 in 1987 and was discontinued in 2009. The displacement is 1.3 L (1295 cc), bore and stroke is 76.0 mm x 71.4 mm. Available with carburettor (HC-C/F) and fuel injection (HC-E/EJ). The compression ratio is between 9.0:1 to 9.5:1. Maximum power is between 73–94 PS (72–93 hp; 54–69 kW) at 6000–6500 rpm with 92–118 N⋅m (9.4–12.0 kg⋅m; 68–87 lbf⋅ft) of torque at 3200–4500 rpm. This engine was later replaced by the K3 engine.

Applications:

- Daihatsu Charade (G102/112/200) (1988–2000)
- Daihatsu Terios/Toyota Cami (J100G) (1997–1999)
- Daihatsu Personal Coupe concept (1993)
- Daihatsu Zebra/D130 Jumbo/Hijet Maxx (S89/91) (1989–2007)
- Perodua Kembara (1998–2003)
- Perodua Rusa (1996–2005)
- Shelby Patriot (1990–1994)

== HD (1.6 L) ==
Based on the Japanese Wikipedia article

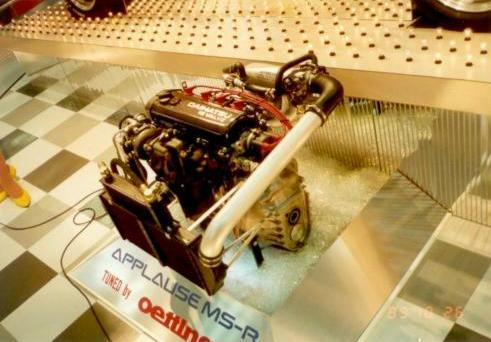
A turbocharged Daihatsu HD-E engine tuned by Oettinger (fi), made specially for the Daihatsu Applause MS-R concept In 1989.

First appeared in Daihatsu Applause in June 1989 and discontinued in 2008. The displacement was increased to 1.6 L (1589 cc) by increasing the stroke size of the HC engine to 87.6 mm but retaining the same 76.0 mm bore size. Available with carburettor (HD-C/F1) or fuel injection (HD-E/E1/EG/EP). The compression ratio is between 9.5:1 to 10.5:1. Maximum power is between 82–125 PS (81–123 hp; 60–92 kW) at 5600–6300 rpm with 115–144 N⋅m (11.7–14.7 kg⋅m; 85–106 lbf⋅ft) at 3200–4800 rpm of torque.

Applications:

- Daihatsu Applause (1989–2000)
- Daihatsu Charade De Tomaso/GTi (G201) (1993–1998)
- Daihatsu Feroza (F70/75)
- Daihatsu Pyzar/Gran Move (1996–2002)
- Daihatsu Rocky (F300) (1989–2002)
- Daihatsu Taruna (F500RV/F520RV) (1999–2001)
- Daihatsu Zebra Espass (S92) (1994–2003)
- Perodua Rusa (1997–2008)
- Daihatsu X-021 concept car (1991)

== HE (1.5 L) ==
The HE-E/EG engine first appeared in the Daihatsu Charade (G203/213) in 1993 and was discontinued in 2007. The displacement was decreased to 1.5 L (1498 cc) by decreasing the stroke size of HD engine to 82.6 mm but retained the same 76.0 mm bore size. The compression ratio is 9.5:1. Maximum power is between 81–100 PS (80–99 hp; 60–74 kW) at 5600–6300 rpm with 112–127 N⋅m (11.4–13.0 kg⋅m; 83–94 lbf⋅ft) at 3200–3600 rpm of torque. This engine was later replaced by the Toyota 3SZ-VE engine.

Applications:

- Daihatsu Charade (G203/213) (1993–2000)
- Daihatsu Taruna (F501RV/F521RV) (2001–2006)
- Daihatsu Pyzar/Gran Move (1996–2002)
- Daihatsu Zebra Espass (S92) (2003–2007)

== See also ==
- List of Daihatsu engines
