= Daihatsu Applause =

Daihatsu Applause (A101/111S)
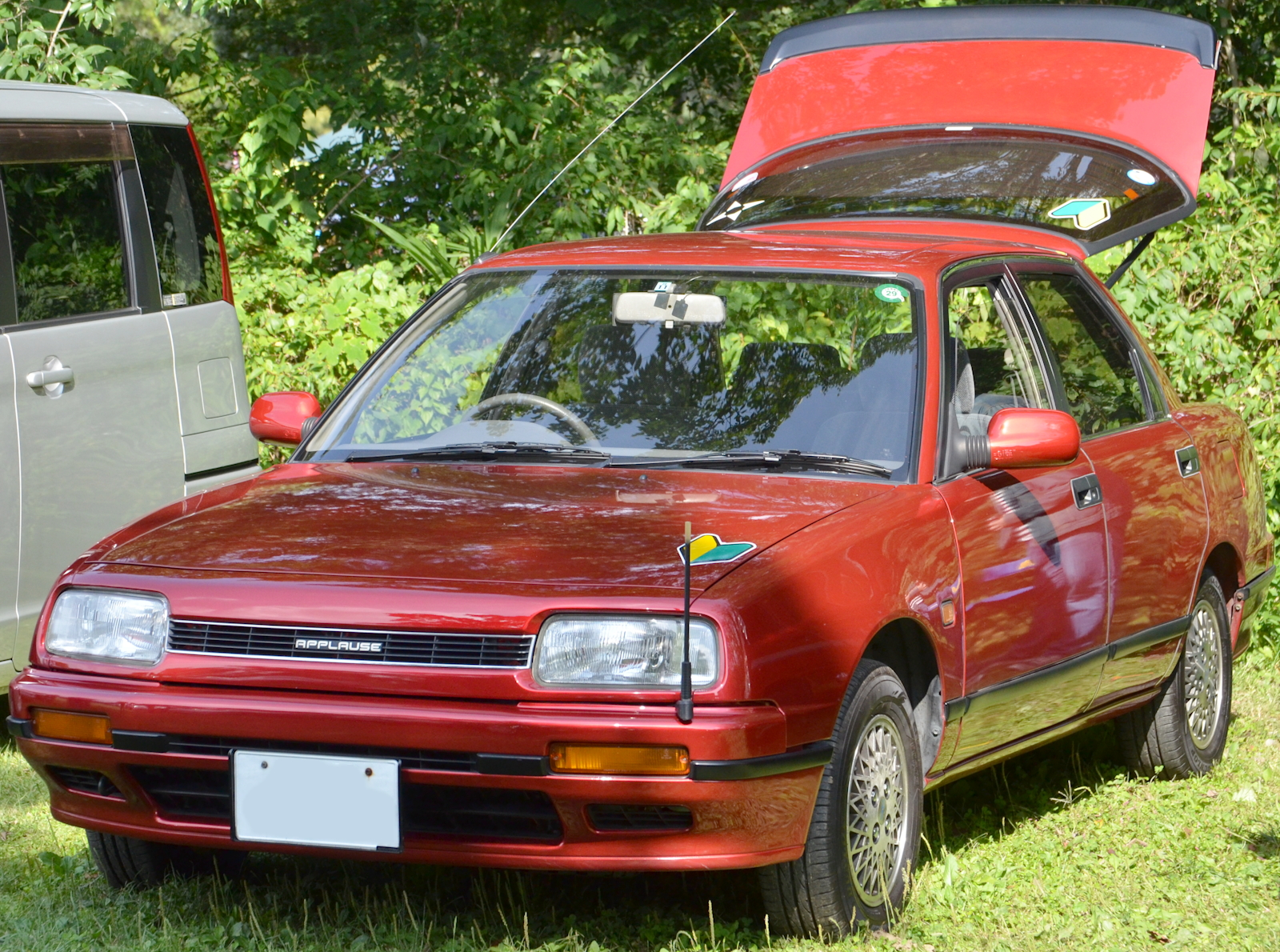
- 1989–1992 Daihatsu Applause

Overview
- Manufacturer: Daihatsu
- Production: 1989–2000
- Assembly: Ryūō, Shiga, Japan (Daihatsu Shiga Plant)

Body and chassis
- Class: Compact car (C)
- Body style: 5-door liftback sedan
- Layout: Front-engine, front-wheel-drive (A101S); Front-engine, four-wheel-drive (A111S)

Powertrain
- Engine: 1.6 L HD I4
- Transmission: 5-speed manual; 3/4-speed automatic

Dimensions
- Wheelbase: 2,470 mm (97.2 in)
- Length: 4,260 mm (167.7 in) (1989–1992); 4,310 mm (169.7 in) (1992–1997); 4,340 mm (170.9 in) (1997–2000)
- Width: 1,660 mm (65.4 in)
- Height: 1,375 mm (54.1 in) (FWD); 1,390 mm (54.7 in) (AWD)
- Curb weight: 920–1,060 kg (2,028–2,337 lb)

Chronology
- Predecessor: Daihatsu Charmant
- Successor: Daihatsu Altis

The Daihatsu Applause (Japanese: ダイハツ・アプローズ, Daihatsu Apurōzu) is a compact car (C-segment in Europe) manufactured by the Japanese automaker Daihatsu for British and Australian markets. The Daihatsu Applause was manufactured from 1989 to 2000. It is most notable for its unusual body style, which, despite appearing to be a 4-door notchback sedan, is in fact a 5-door liftback with a notchback-shaped 412-litre trunk and a tailgate.

== History ==
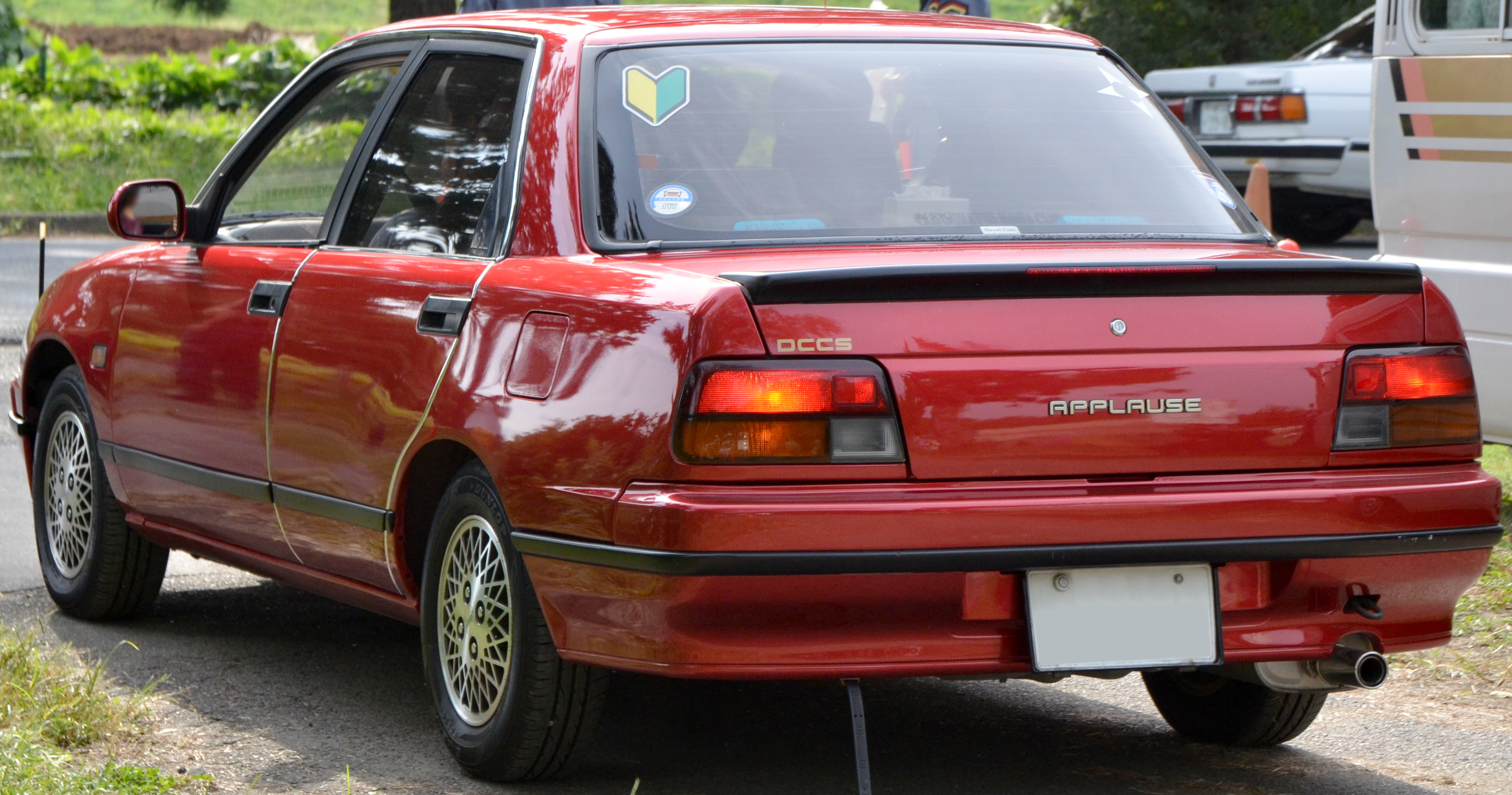
1989–1992 Daihatsu Applause

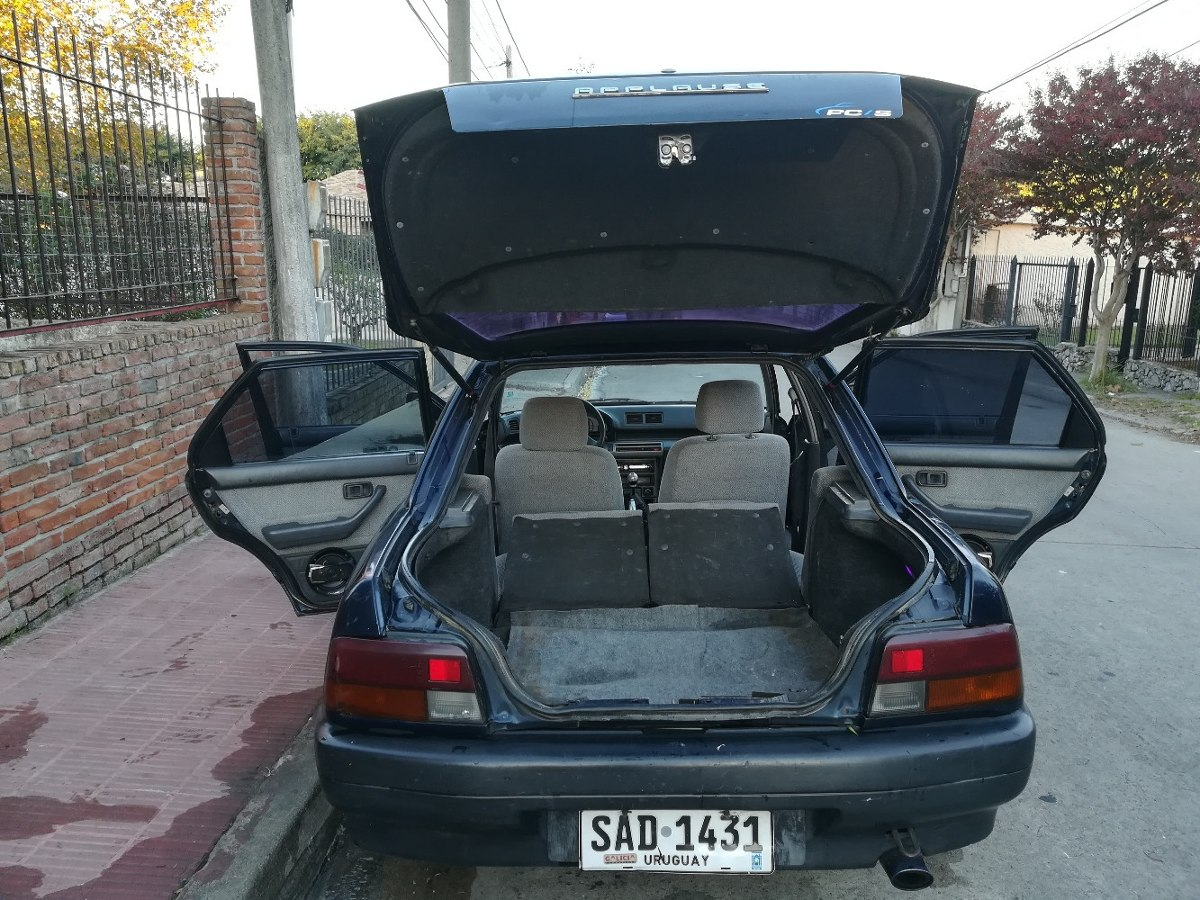
A Daihatsu Applause with its trunk open

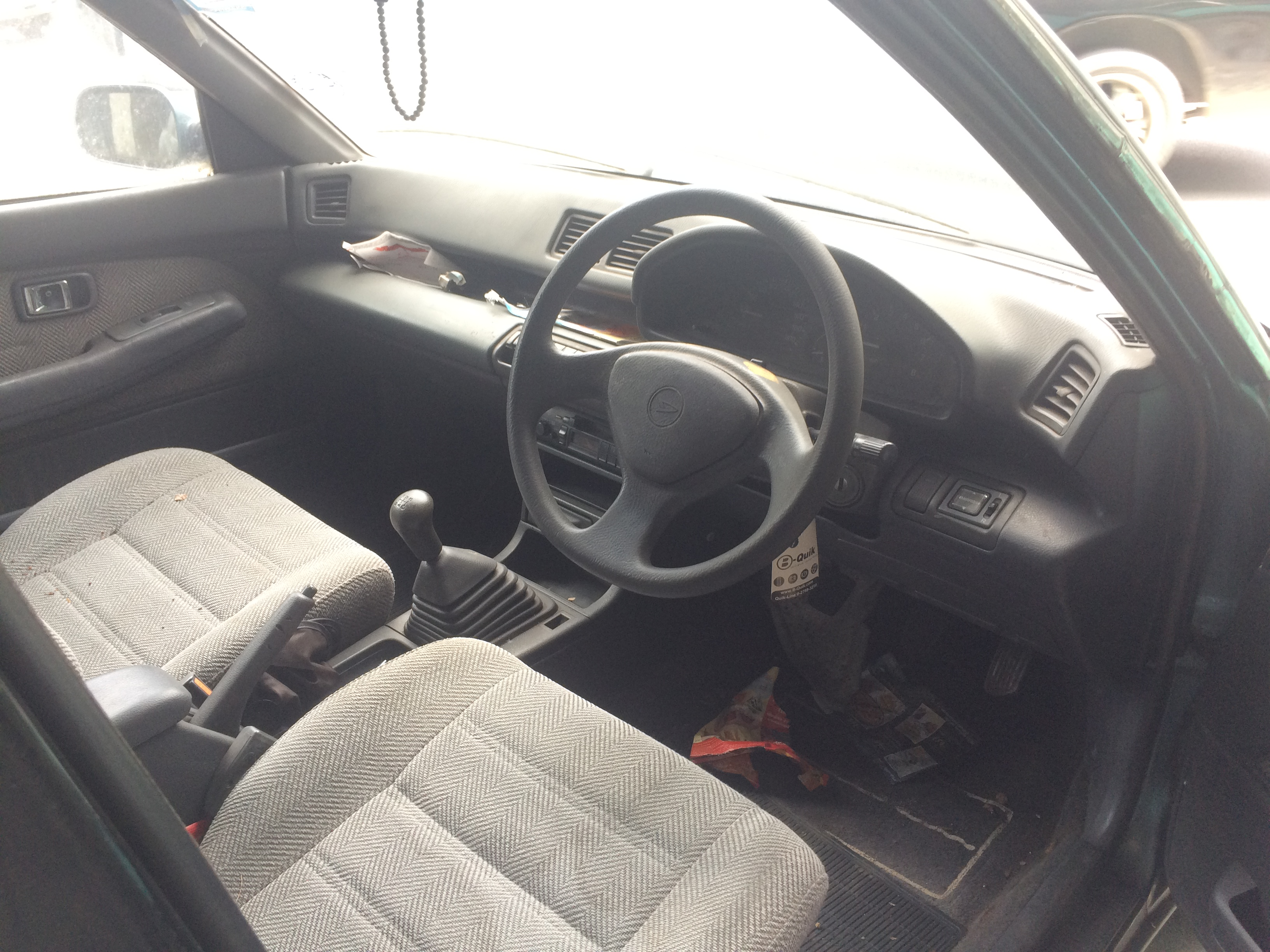
1989–1997 Interior

As Daihatsu firmly established itself as Toyota's compact car specialist brand, compact cars were the biggest vehicles marketed by the company. When replacing the long-running Charmant, the company decided to try a unique approach at the segment, with the intention to capitalize on the preferences for sedans, while at the same time offering the flexibility and convenience of a 5-door liftback body. Resulting from such thinking, the Applause was presented at the 1989 Geneva Motor Show in production-ready "concept" form, as the MS-X90. The engine was also a new development, a 16-valve 1.6-liter inline-four shared with the F300-series Rocky/Feroza/Sportrak. Daihatsu took the opportunity to introduce a platform that was not shared with an existing Toyota platform that the previous Charmant used when the Toyota Corolla was changed to front wheel drive with the Toyota Corolla (E80) in 1983. A high-performance concept called the Applause MS-R was showcased at the 1989 Essen Motor Show. Developed in collaboration with German tuning company Oettinger (fi), it featured a new suspension setup and a turbocharged engine with an intercooler, producing 180 PS (132 kW; 178 hp).

In the first year in the market, Applause's reputation was tarnished by widely publicized incidents of gasoline spurting under excessive air pressure while refuelling, which could lead to very hazardous accidents. Daihatsu fixed the problem in the 1990 model, named Applause Theta, to highlight the improvement. The car was engineered from the beginning to be equipped with four-wheel-drive, a model which appeared only a few months after the introduction. It came equipped with a viscous coupling, sending up to 47 percent of the power to the rear wheels. In the spring of 1991 Daihatsu presented a cabrio coach prototype of the Applause, called the Applause Windward, but it never entered production.

=== 1992 facelift ===
In 1992, the Applause was mildly facelifted, with a subtle alteration of the front and rear fascias and slight increase in length. The "Theta" designation was dropped. The carburetor engine was not available anymore, replaced by a down-tuned version of the fuel injected engine which qualified for a lower insurance category in many European markets. The 1994 model year saw the cancellation of the AWD version, with a rear fascia upgrade and slight grille alteration given to the rest of the range. In Belgium, a dealer optional station wagon body style was offered between 1991 and 1992, developed by Belgian coachbuilder EBS (nl).

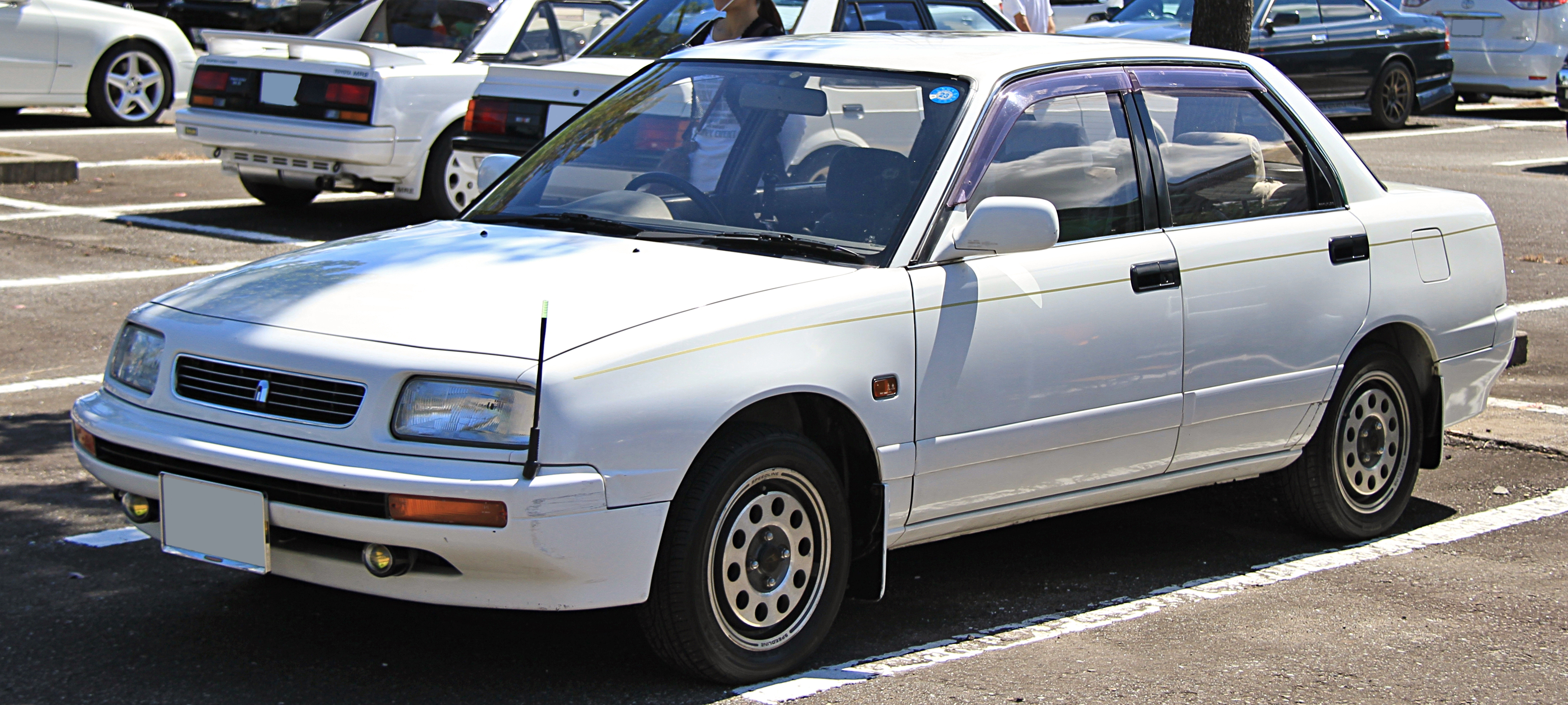
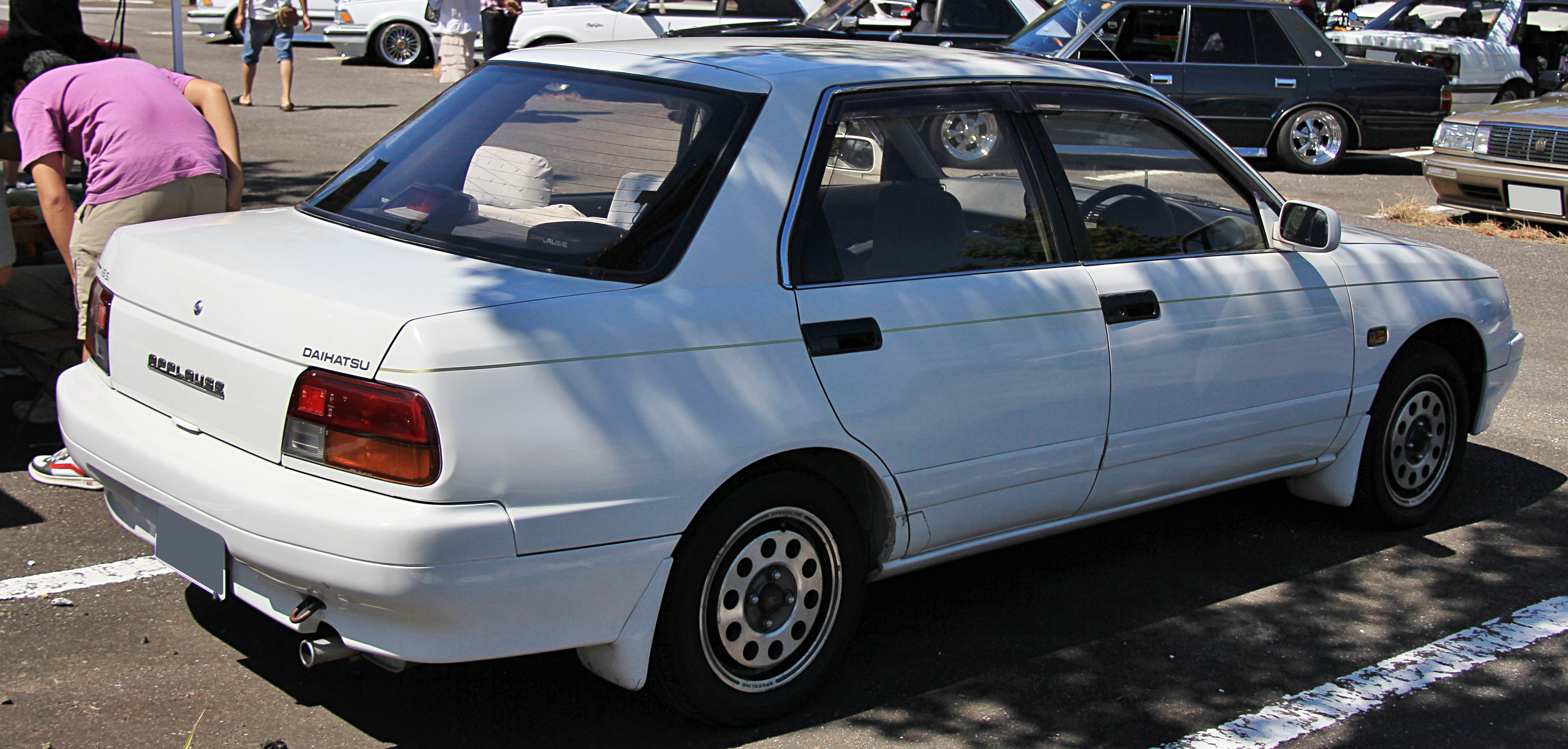
1992–1997 Daihatsu Applause

=== 1997 facelift ===
Although the Daihatsu Applause can be said to have looked very modern and be at least on par with competition in terms of size back in 1989, after seven years in the market it began to appear quite dated and smaller than newer compact cars. Daihatsu found it economically unjustifiable to replace the car with an all-new model, but rather gave the car an extensive facelift in hope of reviving weakening sales.

The refreshed Applause debuted at the 57th Frankfurt Motor Show in September 1997. Totally new front and rear fascias provided for a much more "formal" appearance, along with a small increase in length. However, the car remained the same with regard to all other measurements, including cargo capacity.

The facelift did not help sales result much, so the model was discontinued altogether in May 2000, without a direct replacement for export markets. In Japan, the Altis, which was in essence a rebadged Toyota Camry, took over its role as Daihatsu's largest sedan.

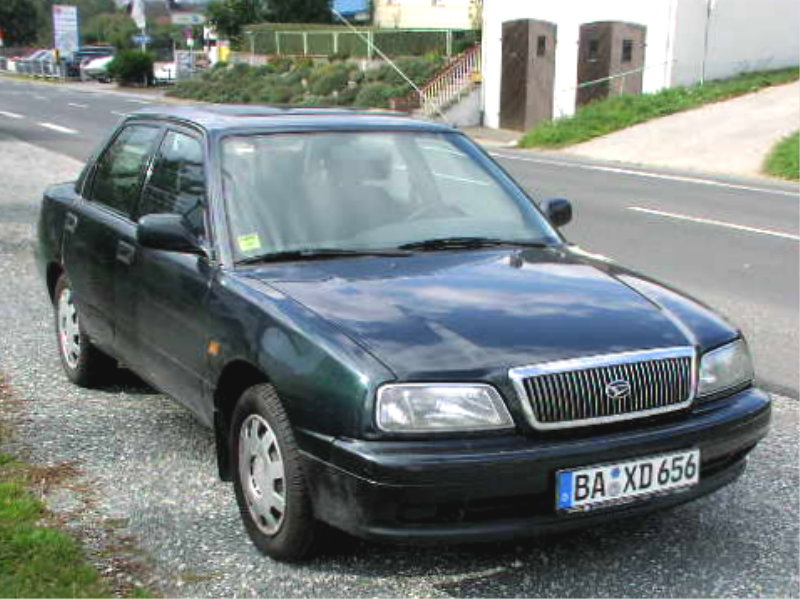
1997–2000 Daihatsu Applause (front)

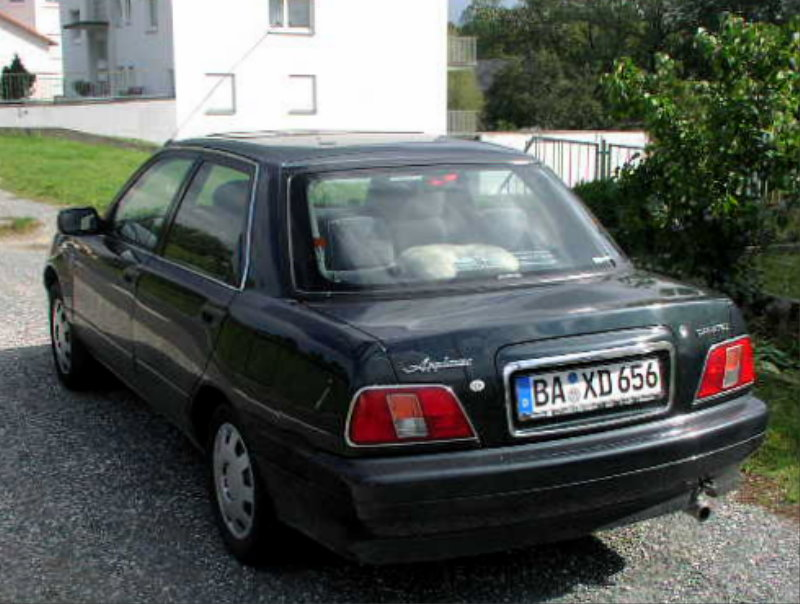
1997–2000 Daihatsu Applause (rear)

== Drivetrain ==
The Applause was a FF layout car with transversely-mounted engine. A full-time AWD version was sold from late 1989 to 1994.

=== Engine ===
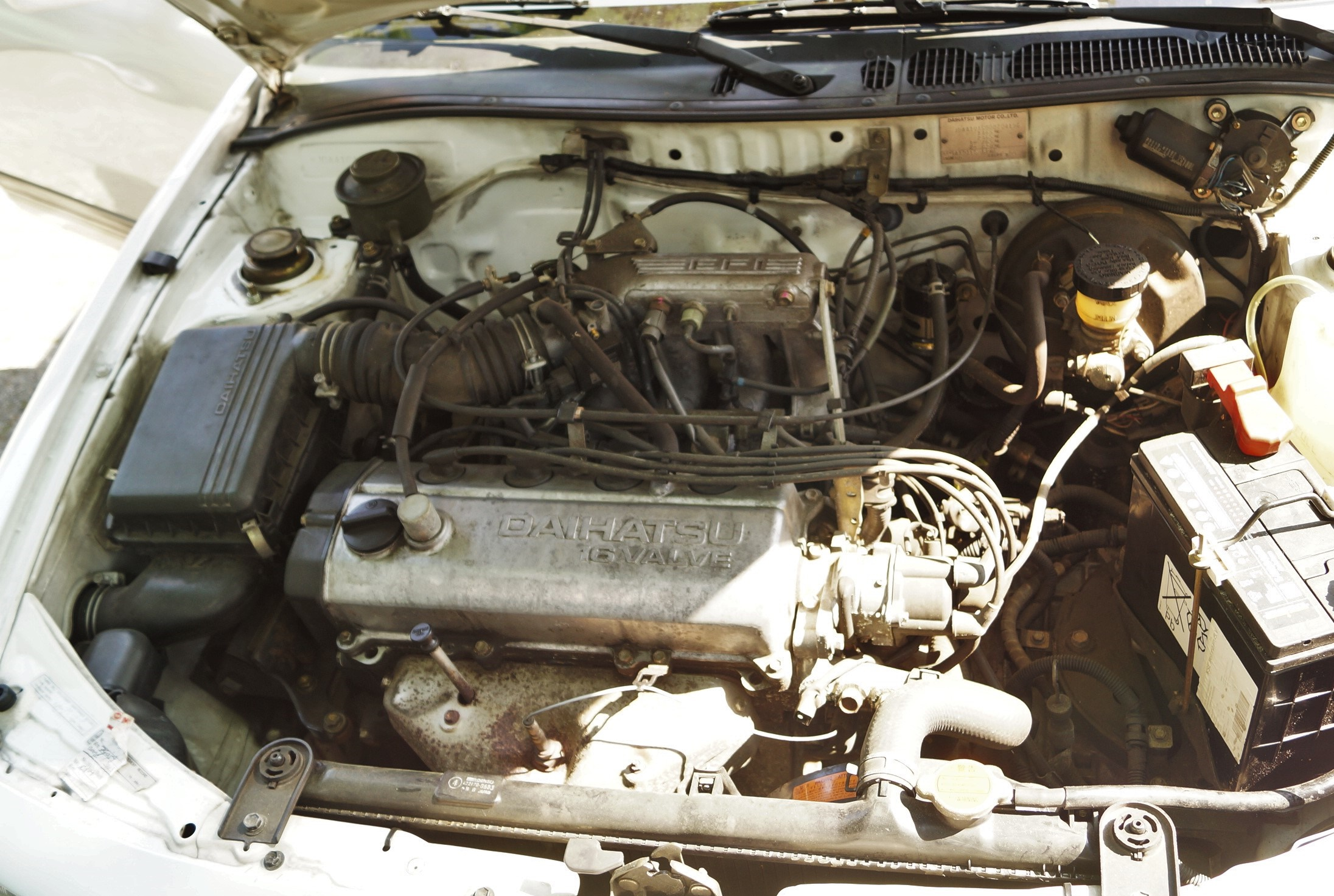
Daihatsu 1.6 L HD-E fuel injected SOHC 16-valve engine.

All models were powered by various versions of the Daihatsu HD 1589 cc straight-four 16-valve SOHC engine.

- HD-F carburetor, 91 PS (67 kW; 90 hp) - 1989–1992 (export markets)
- HD-F carburetor, 97 PS (71 kW; 96 hp) - 1989–1992 (domestic market)
- HD-E EFI, 105 PS (77 kW), 134 N⋅m (99 lb⋅ft) of torque - 1989–1997 (export markets, FWD or AWD)
- HD-E EFI, 120 PS (89 kW), 140 N⋅m (103 lb⋅ft) of torque - 1989–2000 (domestic market, compression ratio increased from 9.5 to 10.5 in 1997)
- HD-E EFI, 90 PS (66 kW), 123 N⋅m (91 lb⋅ft) of torque - 1992–1997 (selected export markets)
- HD-E EFI, 99 PS (73 kW), 138 N⋅m (102 lb⋅ft) of torque - 1997–2000 (export markets - replaced both former engines, increased compression ratio)

=== Transmissions ===
- 5-speed manual (not available with 120 PS (88 kW; 118 hp) after 1997)
- 3-speed automatic (105 PS (77 kW) engine, FWD setup, export markets)
- 4-speed automatic (97 PS (71 kW), 120 PS (88 kW) engine, FWD setup, became standard transmission from 1997 for domestic market)

== See also ==
- List of Daihatsu vehicles
