= Daihatsu Pyzar =

Daihatsu Pyzar (G300)
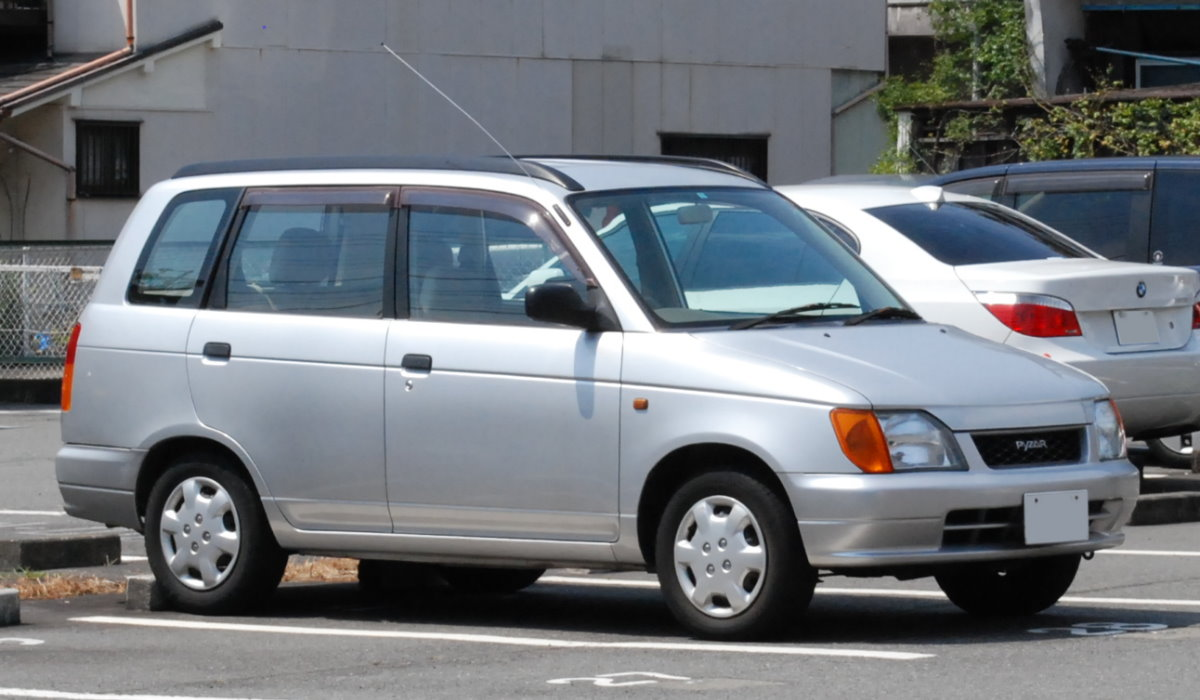
- 1996 Daihatsu Pyzar (pre-facelift)

Overview
- Manufacturer: Daihatsu
- Also called: Daihatsu Gran Move
- Production: August 1996 – August 2002

Body and chassis
- Class: Mini MPV
- Body style: 5-door wagon
- Layout: Front-engine, front-wheel-drive; Front-engine, four-wheel-drive (Japan only)
- Related: Daihatsu Charade (G200)

Powertrain
- Engine: Petrol: 1.5 L HE-EG I4 (G303/313); 1.6 L HD-EP I4 (G301/311)
- Power output: 66–73.5 kW (89–99 hp; 90–100 PS) (HE-EG); 67–84.5 kW (90–113 hp; 91–115 PS) (HD-EP)
- Transmission: 5-speed manual; 4-speed automatic

Dimensions
- Wheelbase: 2,395 mm (94.3 in)
- Length: 4,050–4,115 mm (159.4–162.0 in)
- Width: 1,640 mm (64.6 in)
- Height: 1,595–1,620 mm (62.8–63.8 in)
- Kerb weight: 1,000–1,150 kg (2,204.6–2,535.3 lb)

Chronology
- Successor: Daihatsu YRV

The Daihatsu Pyzar (Japanese: ダイハツ・パイザー, Daihatsu Paizā), sold in some export markets as the Daihatsu Gran Move, is a mini MPV which was manufactured by the Japanese automaker Daihatsu from 1996 to 2002. It is based on the chassis of the G200 series Charade. The name "Pyzar" is derived from the Mongolian-era Silk Road traffic permit, "Paizah".

The Pyzar has a 50/50 split folding rear bench seat, which provided for it being registered as a four-passenger vehicle in most countries. With the rear seat folded, the Pyzar's cargo compartment has a length of 1,500 mm (59.1 in).

== Mid-life facelift ==
After three years in the market, the Pyzar received a mild facelift; the front fascia was slightly altered (the headlamps had clear turn signals) and body decals were rearranged to more in-line with the smaller L600 series Move's styling. Concurrently, a version with the 1.6 L engine replaced the previous 1.5 L one in export markets, except for the Japanese market, where both engines were sold together until the end of the sales in August 2002.

== Engine ==
- 1,498 cc HE-EG 16-valve SOHC I4, 66 kW (90 PS), 119 N⋅m (88 lbf⋅ft) — export markets, 1996–2000
- 1,498 cc HE-EG 16-valve SOHC I4, 74 kW (100 PS), 128 N⋅m (94 lbf⋅ft) — Japan, 1996–2002
- 1,589 cc HD-EP 16-valve SOHC I4, 67 kW (91 PS), 126 N⋅m (93 lbf⋅ft) — export markets, 2000–2002
- 1,589 cc HD-EP 16-valve SOHC I4, 85 kW (115 PS), 140 N⋅m (103 lbf⋅ft) — Japan, 1999–2002

== Gallery ==
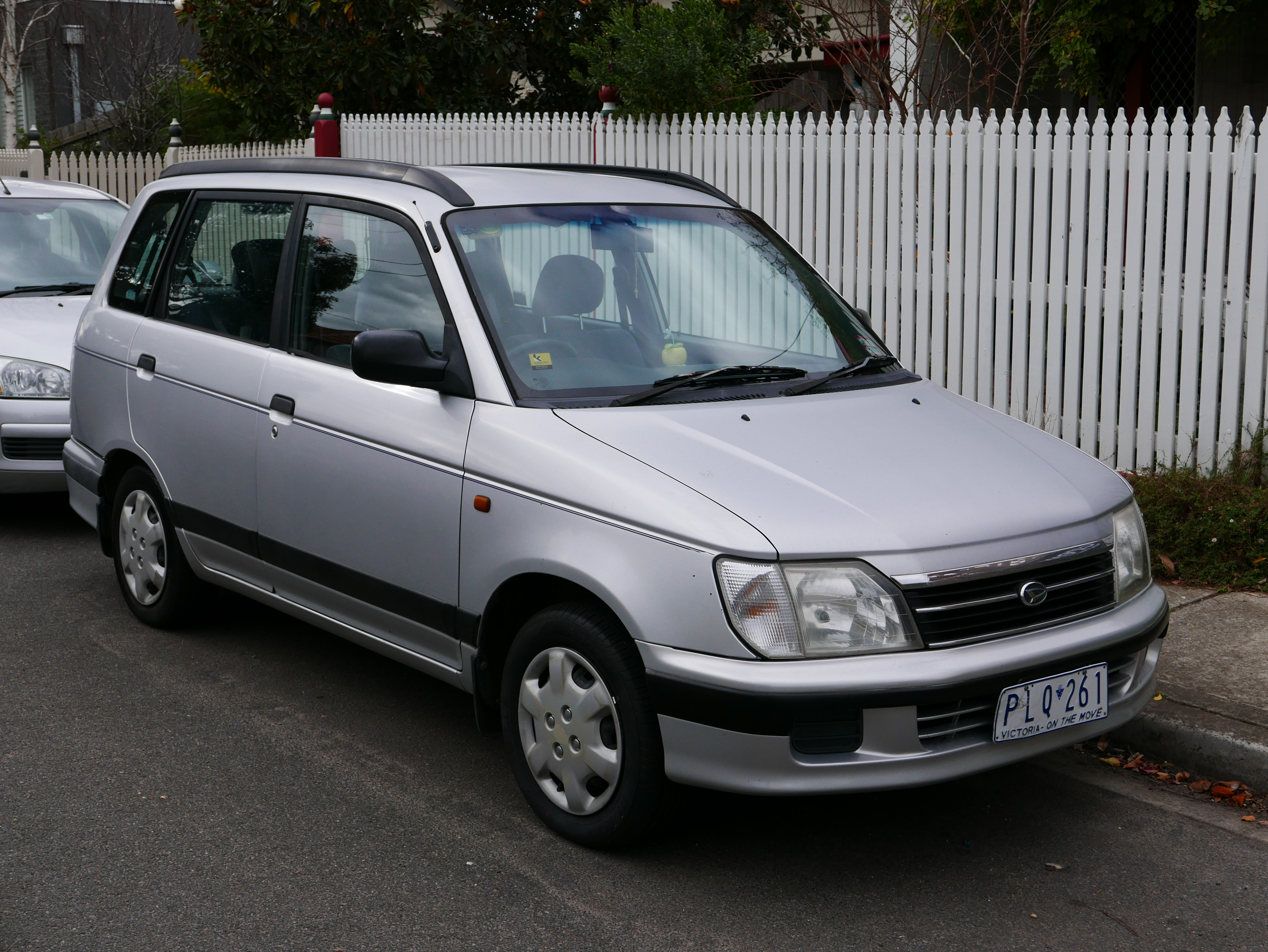
1999 Daihatsu Pyzar GRV (G301, facelift)

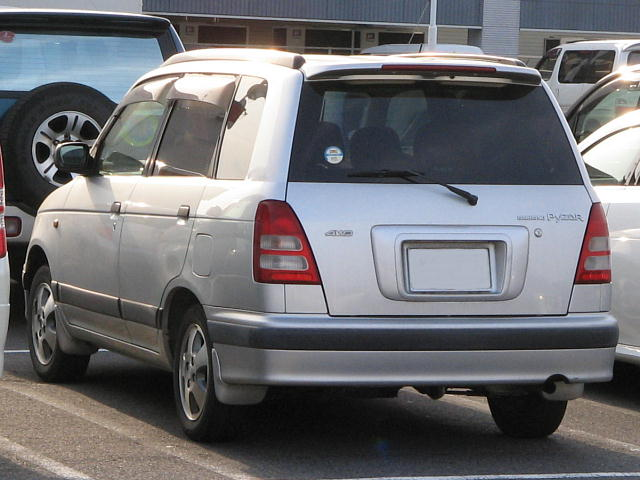
Rear view of Daihatsu Pyzar (facelift)

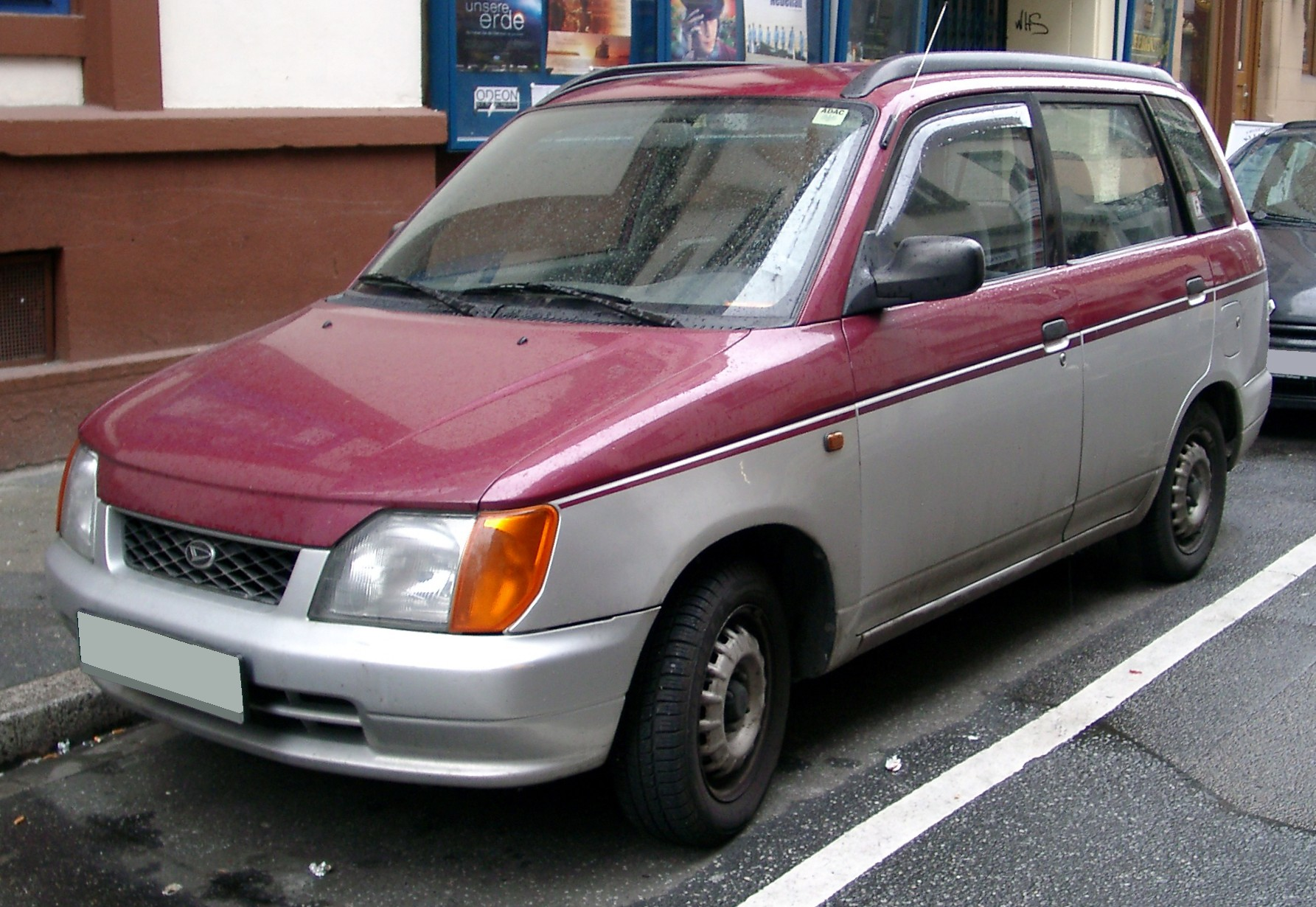
Daihatsu Gran Move (pre-facelift)

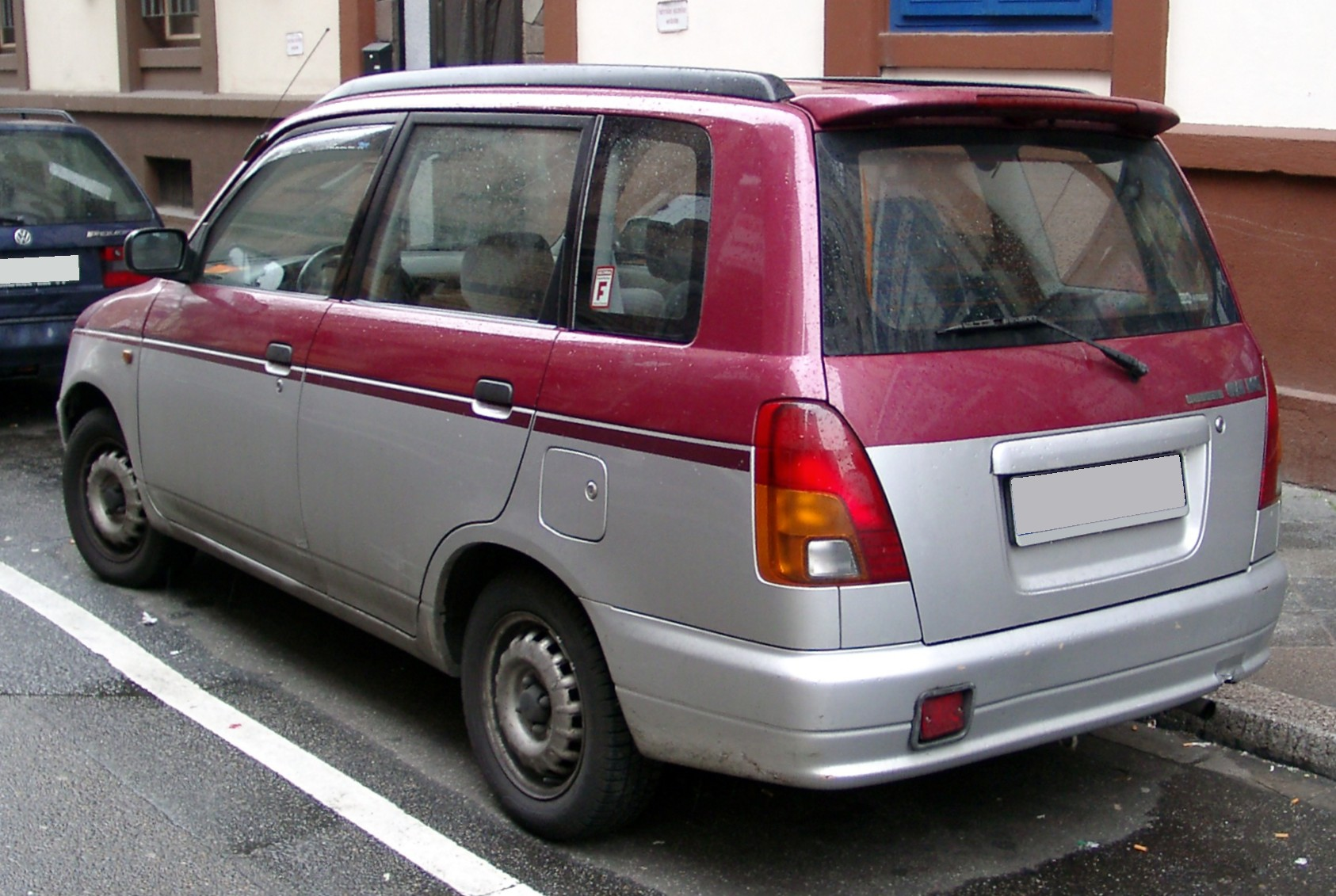
Daihatsu Gran Move (pre-facelift)

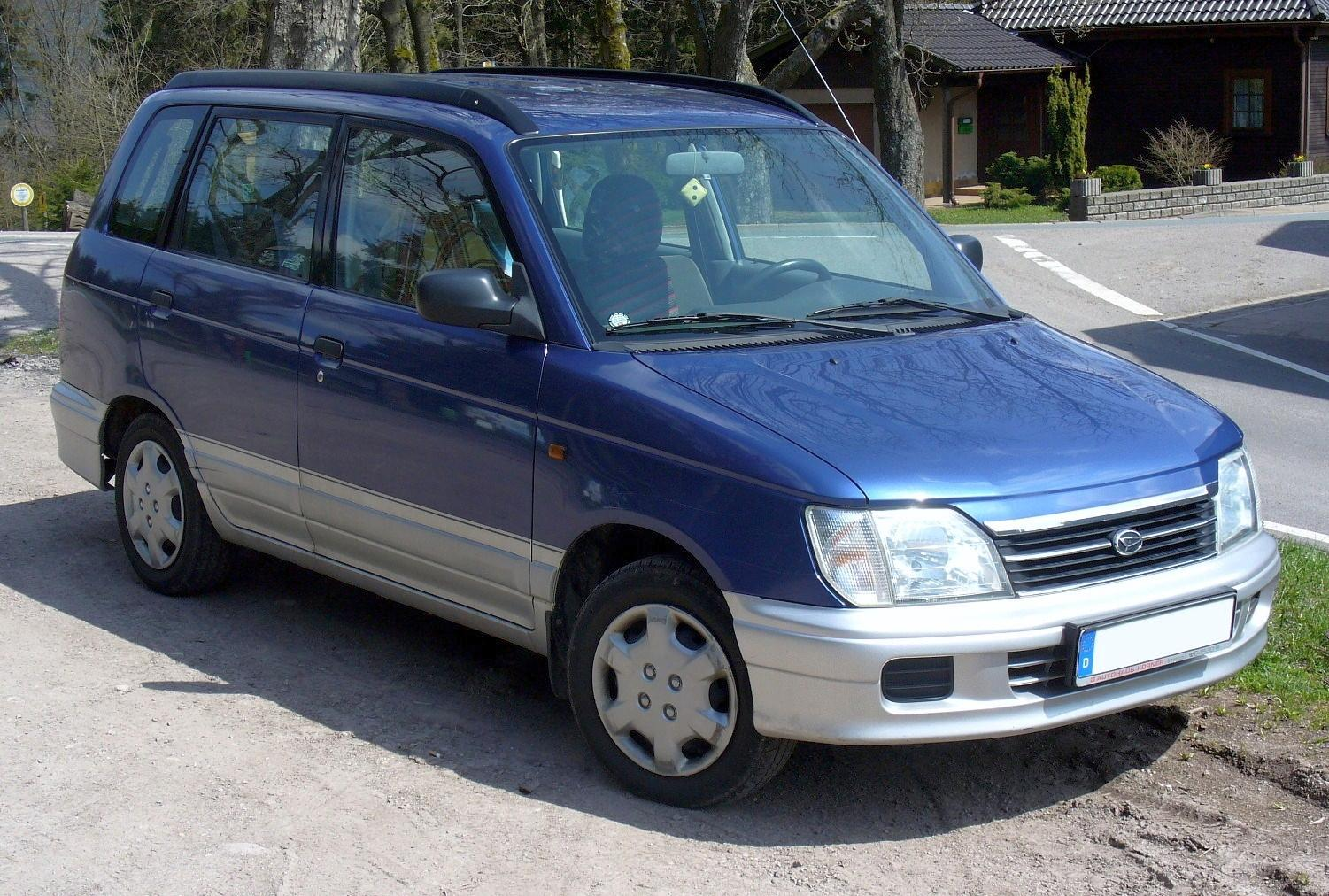
Daihatsu Gran Move (facelift)

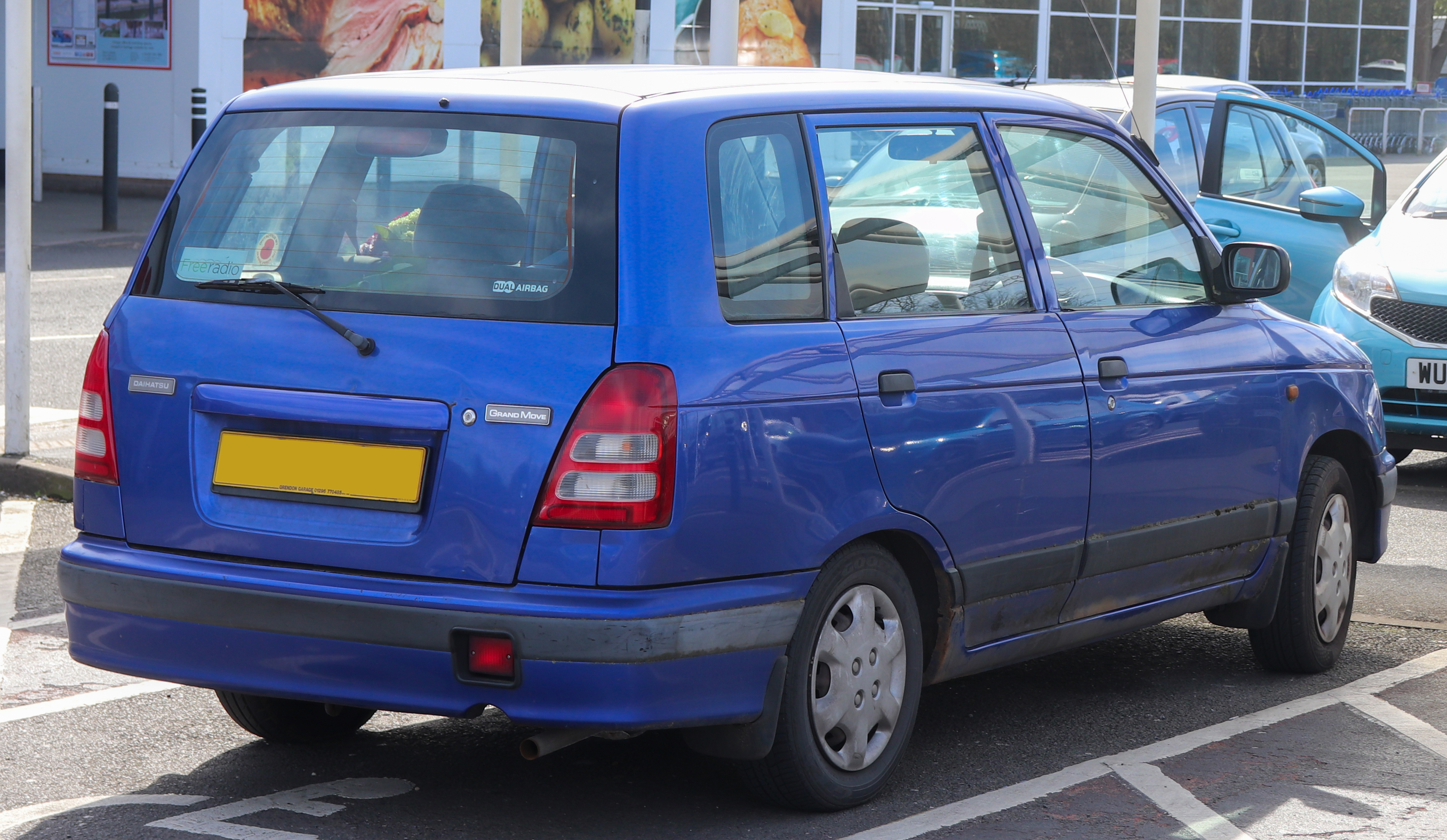
Daihatsu Gran Move (facelift, UK)

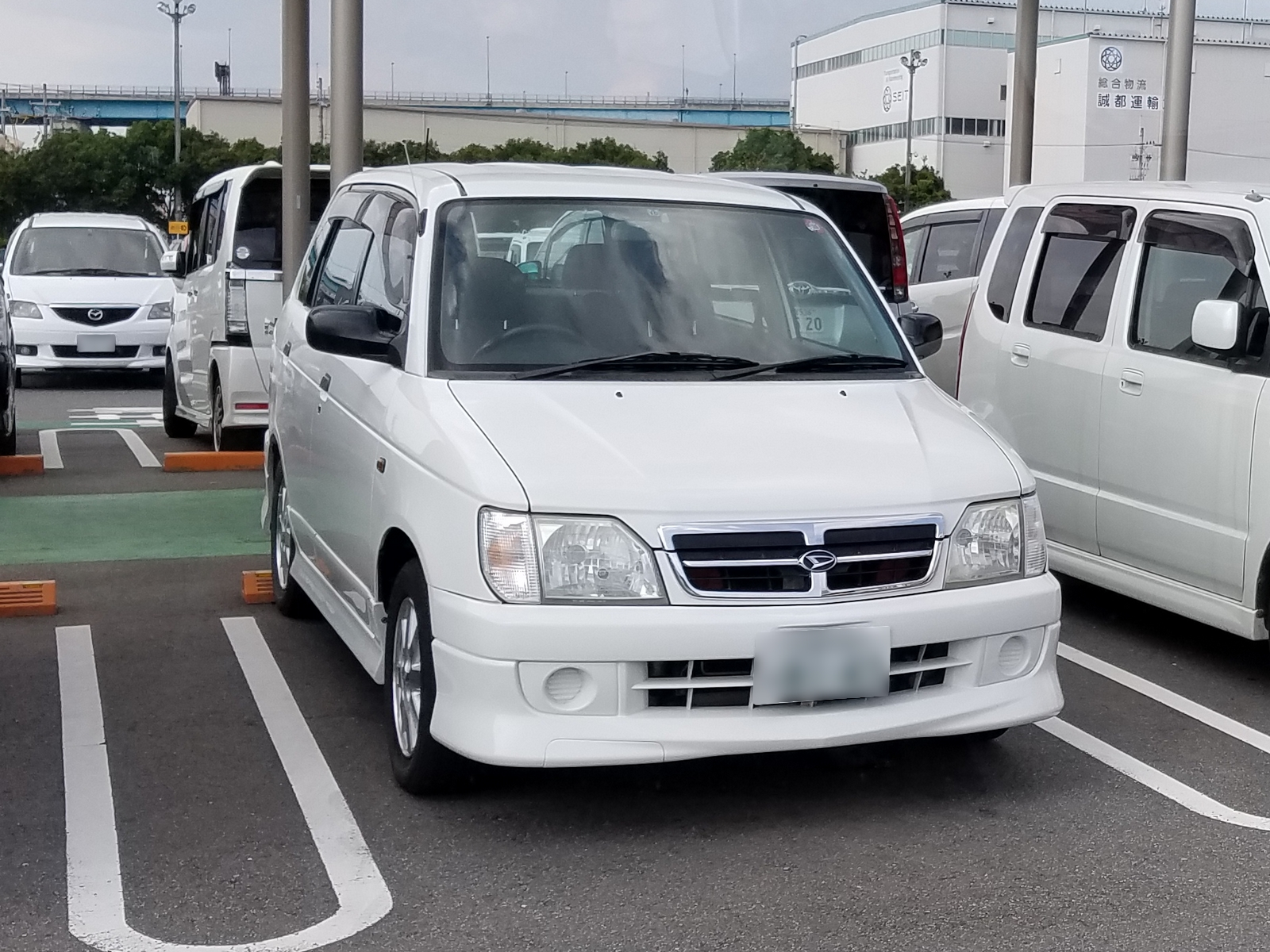
Daihatsu Pyzar CL Aero Version (G301G)

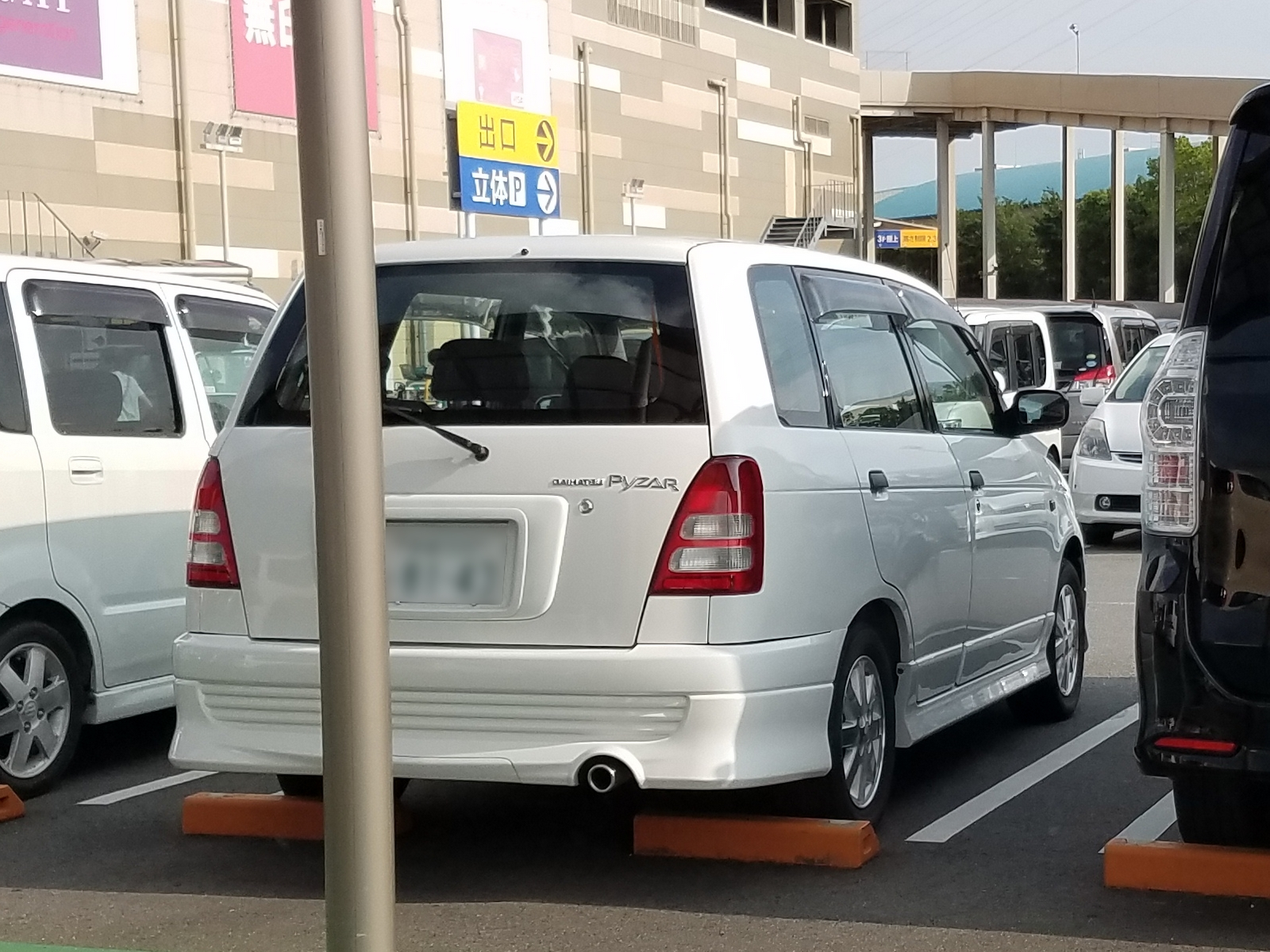
Daihatsu Pyzar CL Aero Version (G301G)
