= BCX =

BCX, BCx, or bcx can refer to:

== Science and technology ==
- Daihatsu BCX, a concept car; see List of Daihatsu concept vehicles
- Business Connexion Group, a South African information technology company

== Places ==
- Buchiana railway station, a defunct train station in Buchiana, Pakistan
- Maralbexi County (also called "Bachu County"), a county of Kashi Prefecture, Xinjiang Uyghur Autonomous Region, China
- Beloretsk Airport (IATA airport code BCX), Beloretsk, Republic of Bashkortostan, Russia; see List of airports by IATA airport code: B

== Medicine ==
- Blood culture, abbreviated "BCx" in medicine
- Laboratoires Biocodex, a company, by pharmaceutical compound number prefix "BCX"; see List of pharmaceutical compound number prefixes

== Other uses ==
- Pamona language (Defunct ISO 639 language code bcx), a language spoken in Indonesia
