= List of Daihatsu concept vehicles =

The following is a list of concept vehicles by Japanese carmaker Daihatsu, a subsidiary of Toyota.

- A-Concept (2011)
- ai (2003)
- Akindo (1997)
- AS-2 (1999)
- Ayla GT (2013)
- Ayla GT2 (2014)
- Ayla Luxury (2013)
- Ayla Turbo (2018)
- Ayla X-Track (2013)
- Basket (2009)
- BC7 (1989)
- BCX (1971)
- BCX-5 (1985)
- BCX-II (1972)
- BCX-III (1973)
- BCX-M (1979)
- Be-go (2005)
- Copen Adventure (2016)
- Copen Cero Coupe (2016)
- Copen Robe Shooting Brake (2016)
- Copen SARD Special (2003)
- Costa (2005)
- CUV (2013)
- CUV2 (2014)
- D-bag4 (1993)
- D-Base (2015)
- D-Bone (2003)
- D-Compact 4x4 (2005)
- D-Concept X-Over (2006)
- D-R (2012)
- D-R Estate (2013)
- D-X (2011)
- Dash 21 (1993)
- Deca Deca (2009)
- DN Compagno (2017)
- DN F-Sedan (2017)
- DN Multisix (2017)
- DN Pro Cargo (2017)
- DN Trec (2017)
- DN U-Space (2017)
- e:S (2009)
- E3 (2003)
- Esse (2005)
- EV1 (1973)
- EV2 (1999)
- EV3 (2013)
- EV4 (2017)
- EV5 (2020
- EV6 (2027)
- FF Ultra Space (2001)
- FR-X (1997)
- FFC (2004)
- FRC (2004)
- FT (2015)
- FX (2015)
- FX-21 (1995)
- FX-228 (1991)
- Hijetdumbo (1989)
- Hinata (2015)
- HSC (2007)
- HVS (2005)
- HY Fun (2019)
- IcoIco (2019)
- K-Open (2025)
- K-Vision (2025)
- Kayoibako K (2025)
- Kopen Future Included RM1 (2014)
- Kopen Future Included RM2 (2014)
- Kopen Future Included RM3 (2014)
- Kopen Future Included RMX (2013)
- Kopen Future Included RMZ (2013)
- Micros-3L (1999)
- Midget II (1993)
- Midget III (1995)
- Midget X (2025)
- Mira Milano (1991)
- Move FCV K-2 (2003)
- MP4 (1995)
- MS-X90 (1989)
- MS-X94 (1994)
- MS-X97 (1997)
- Daihatsu Mud Master-C (2007)
- me:MO (2023)
- Muse (2001)
- Naked X070 (1997)
- Marienkafer (1990)
- Mira PM/L (1987)
- NC-Y (2013)
- NC-Z (2013)
- NCX (1997)
- Noriori (2015)
- OFC-1 (2007)
- Osanpo (2023)
- Personal Coupe (1993)
- PICO (2011)
- RA-90 (1989)
- RA-91 (1991)
- Rocky California Heart (1991)
- Sirion Sport (2006)
- SK-Tourer (2005)
- Sneaker (1989)
- SP-4 (1999)
- Sport (1966)
- SUV (2014)
- TA-X80 (1987)
- Taft Concept (2020)
- Tanto FCHV (2005)
- TEC-1 (1989)
- Tempo (2015)
- Terios Sport
- Town Cube (1995)
- Trek (1985)
- TsumuTsumu (2019)
- U4B (2001)
- UF Mini-S (2002)
- UF Mini-V (2002)
- UFC (2012)
- UFC2 (2013)
- UFC3 (2014)
- UFE-I (2001)
- UFE-II (2003)
- UFE-III (2005)
- Ultramini (1993)
- Urban Buggy (1987)
- UNIFORM Truck (2023)
- UNIFORM Cargo (2023)
- Vision Copen (2023)
- Vizion-F (2023)
- WaiWai (2019)
- WakuWaku (2019)
- X-021 (1991)
- X-409 (1991)
- X-1 (1995)
- Xenia Sport (2019)
- XL-C (2003)
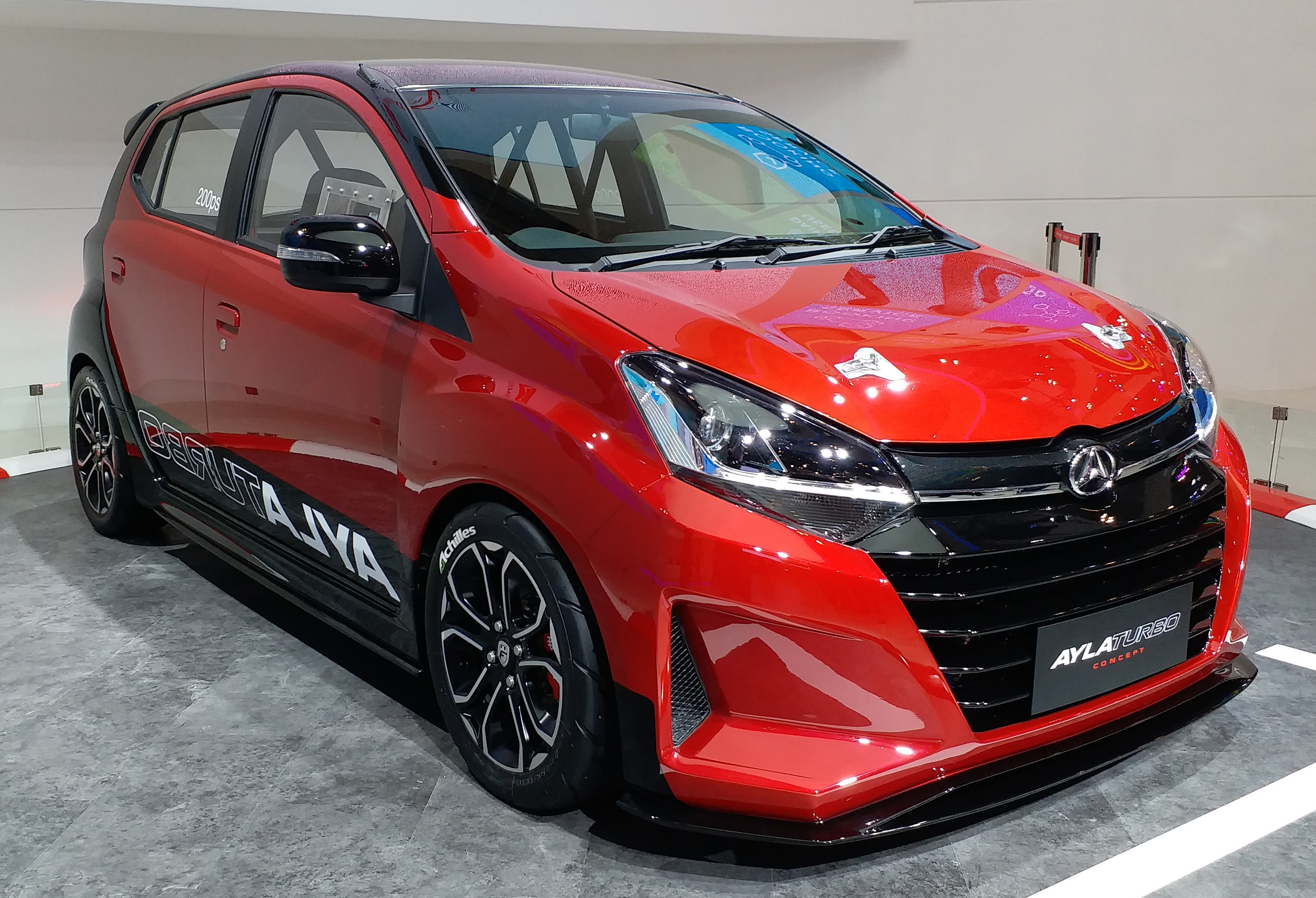
2018 Daihatsu Ayla Turbo

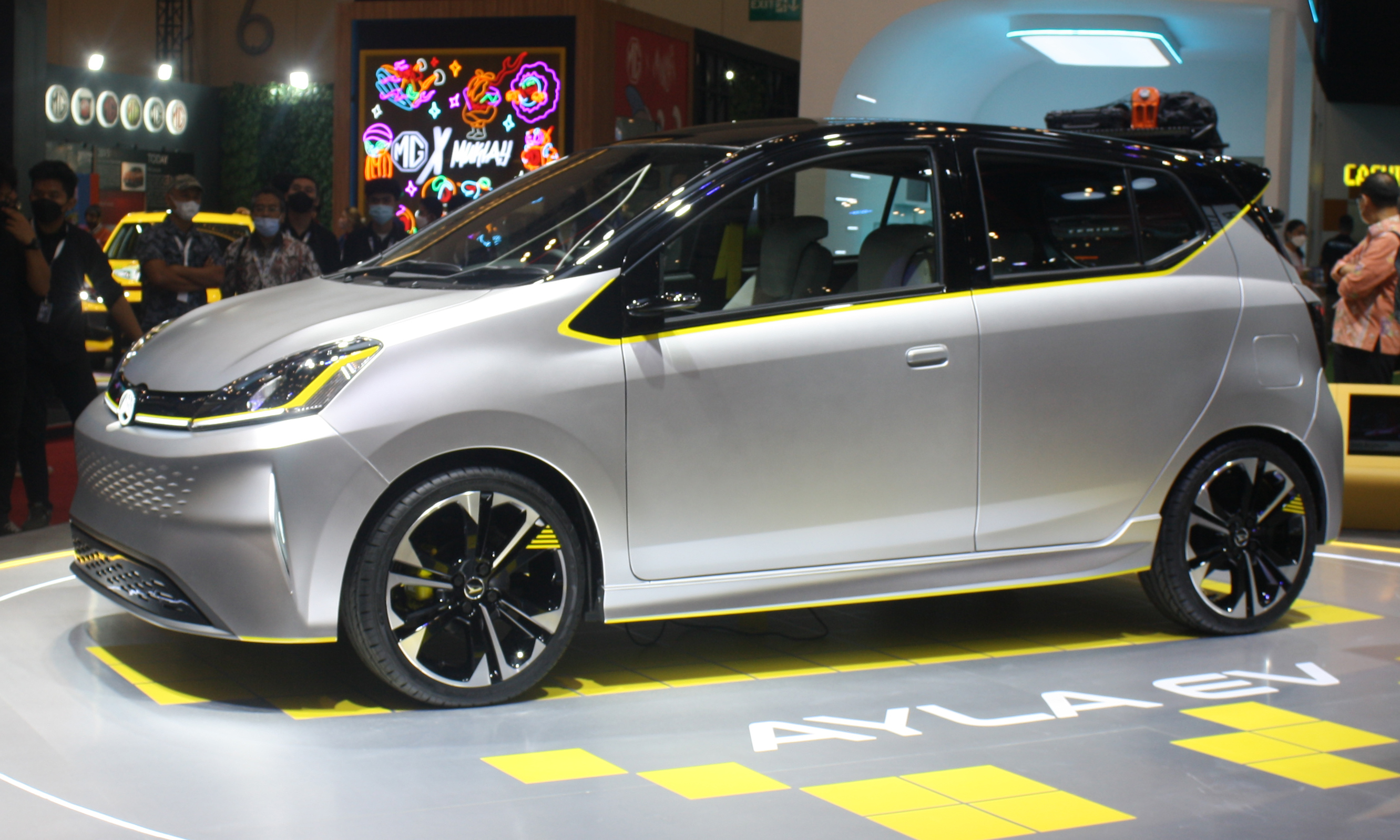
2022 Daihatsu Ayla EV

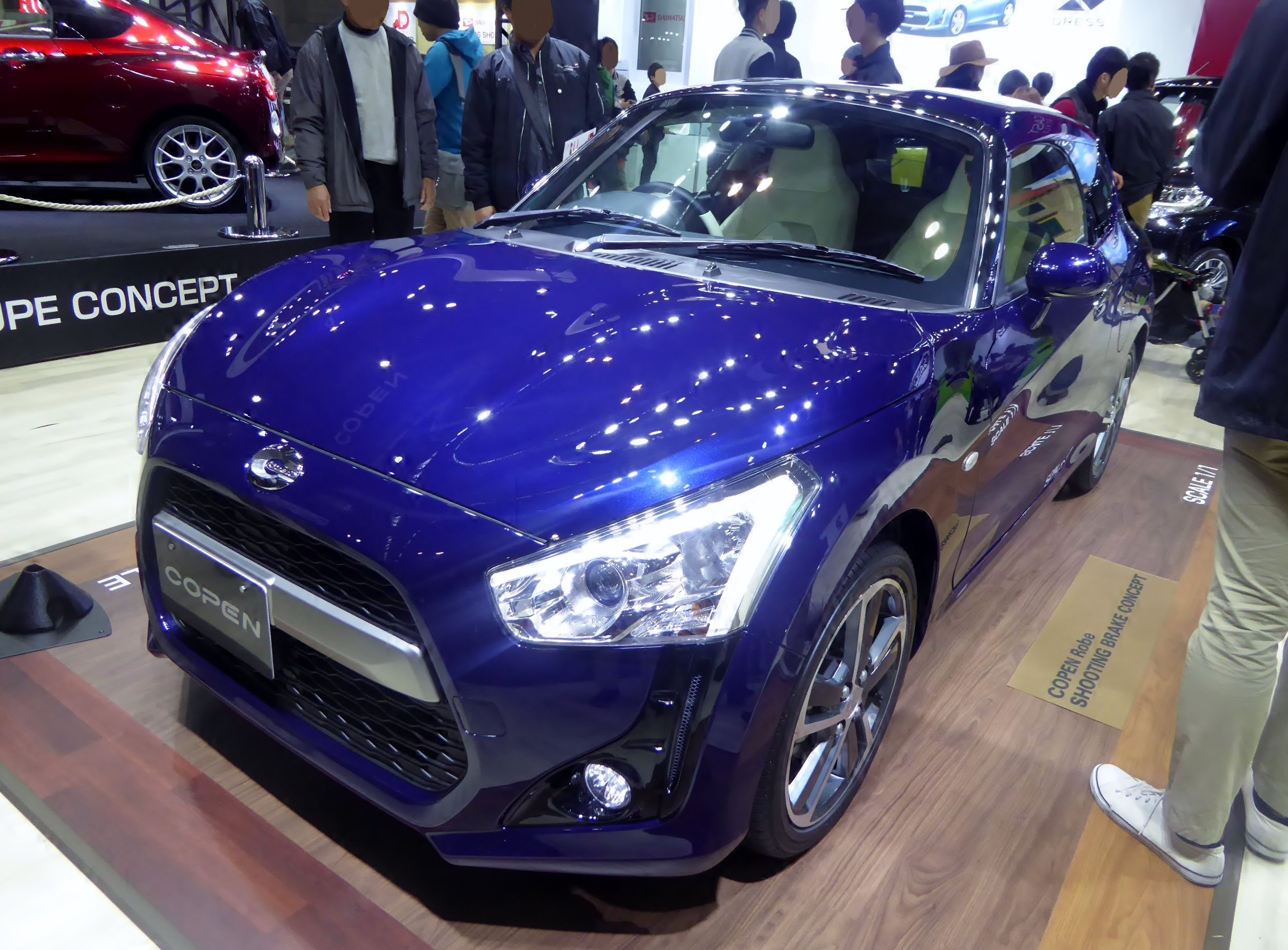
2016 Daihatsu Copen Robe Shooting Brake

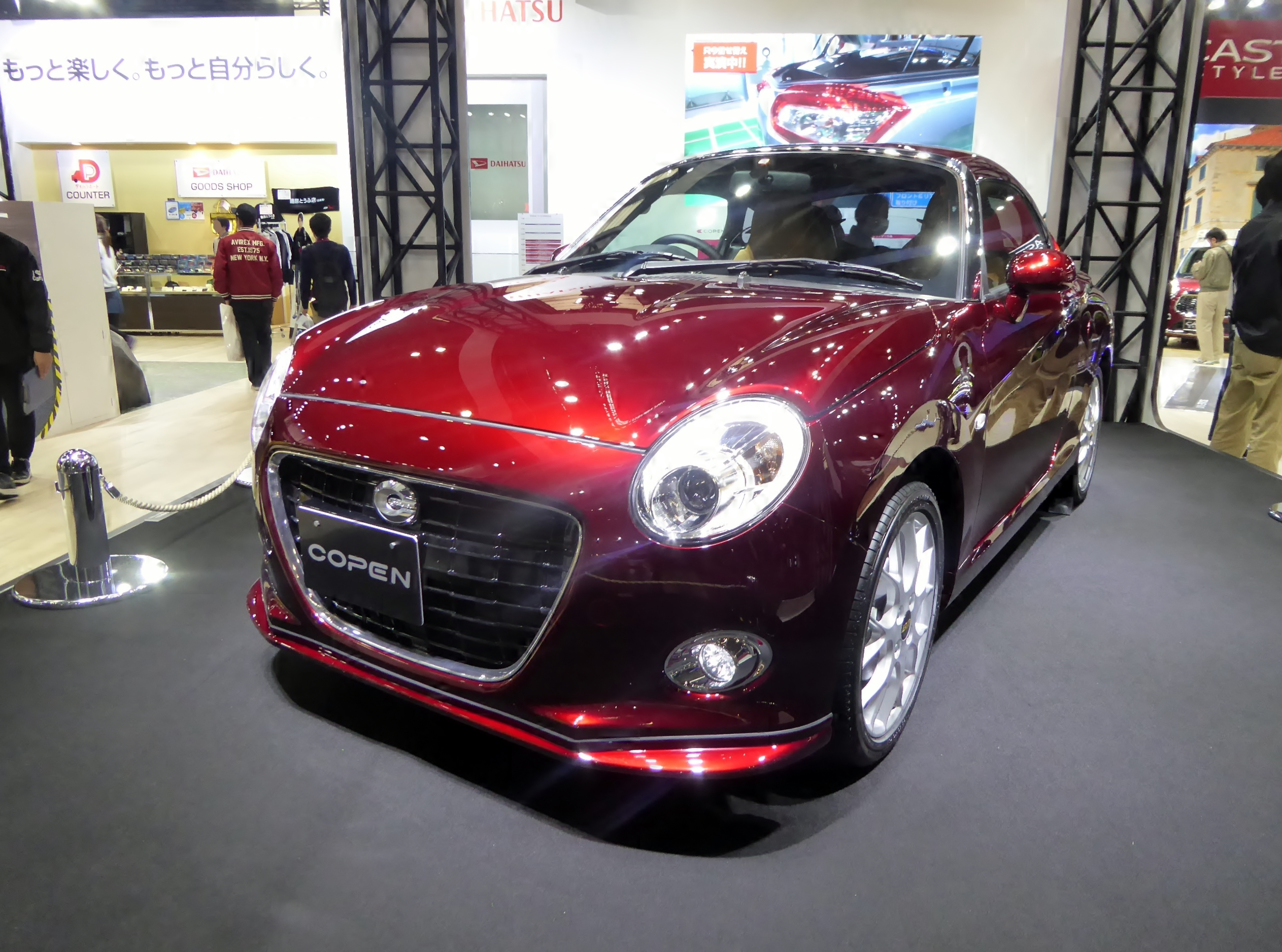
2016 Daihatsu Copen Cero Coupe

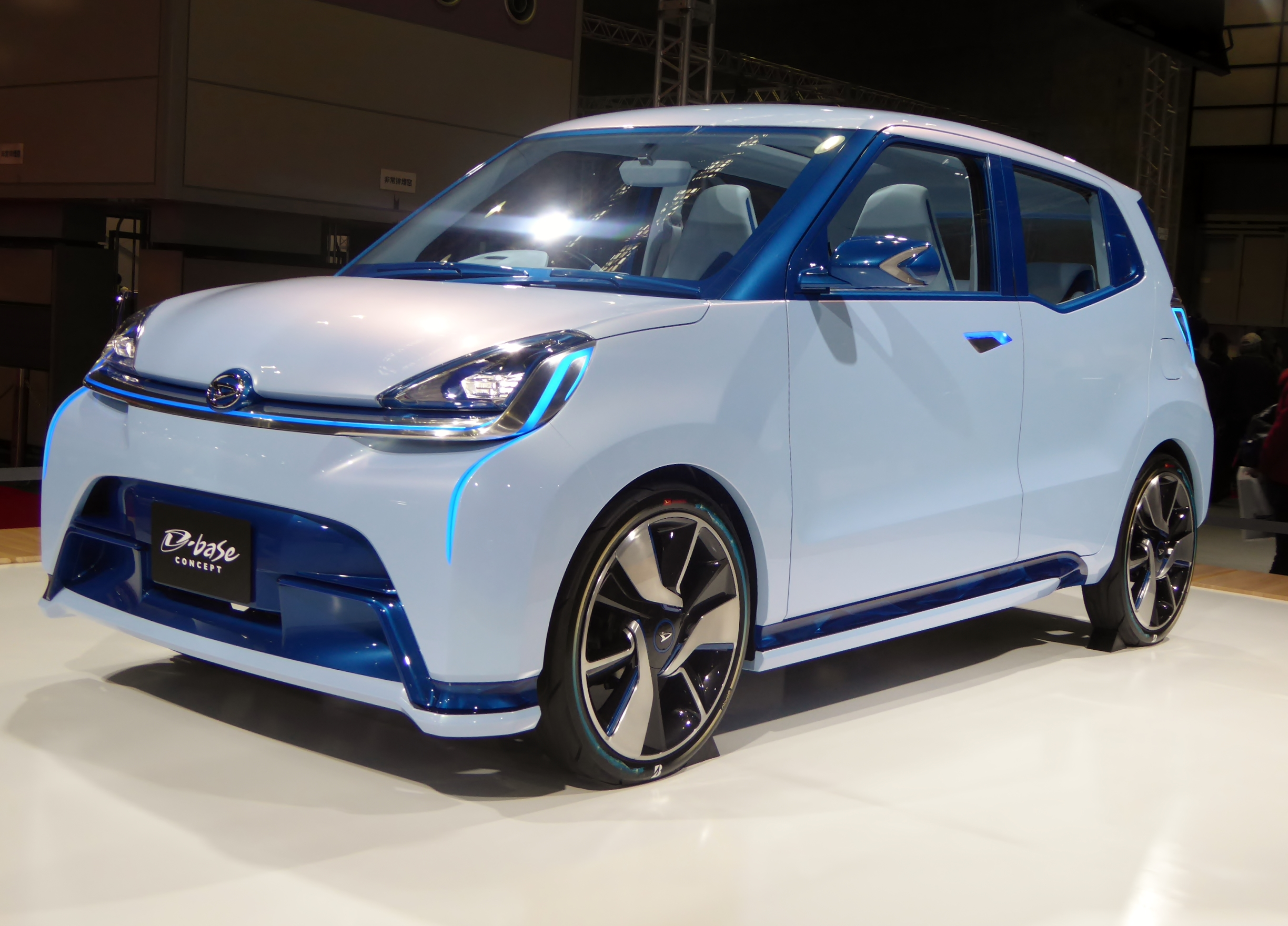
2015 Daihatsu D-Base

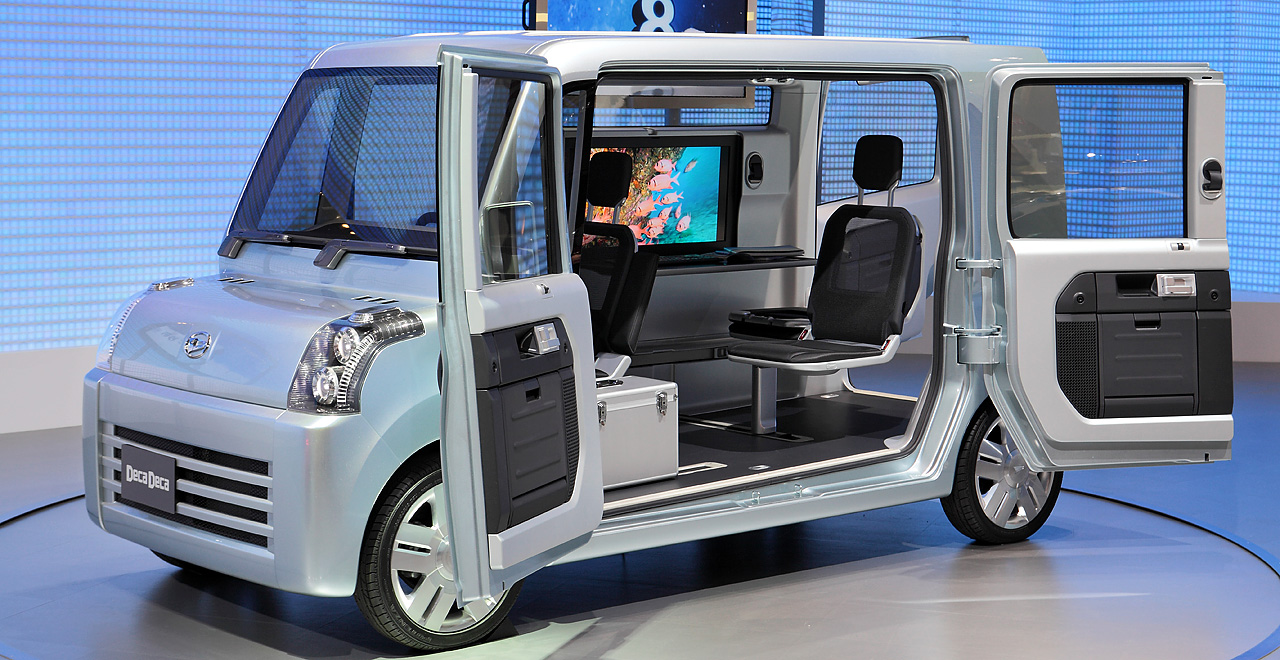
2009 Daihatsu Deca Deca

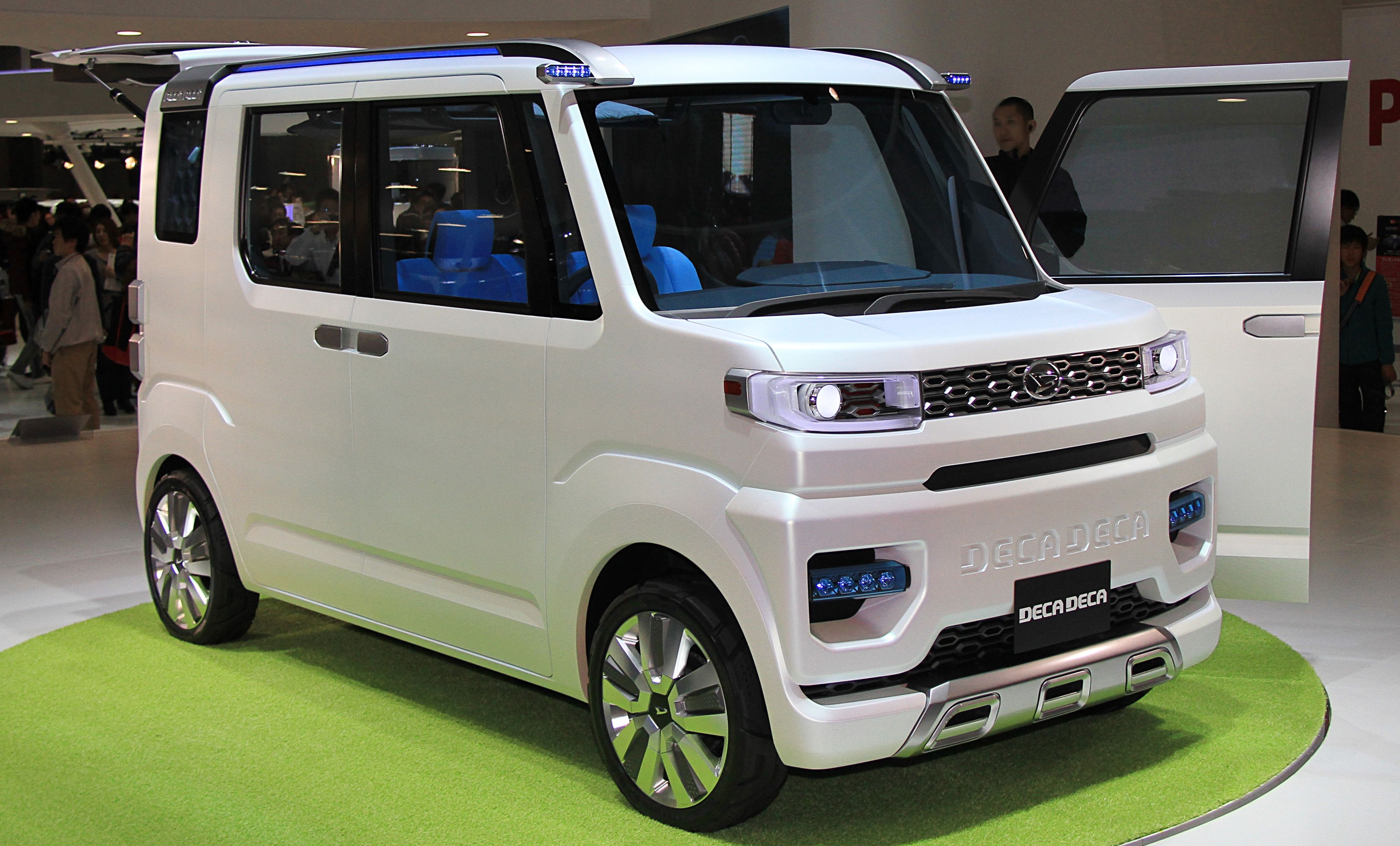
2013 Daihatsu Deca Deca

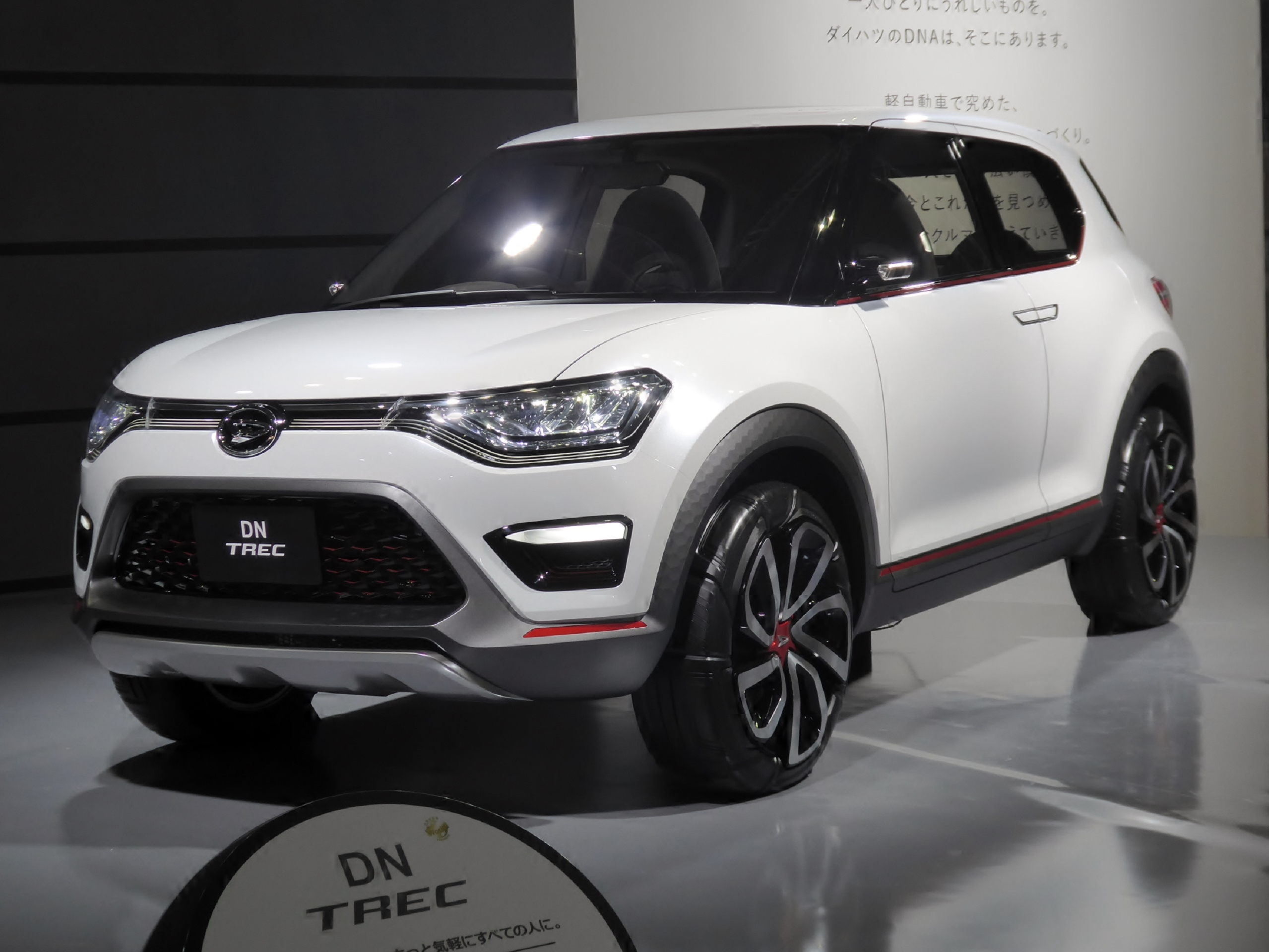
2017 Daihatsu DN Trec

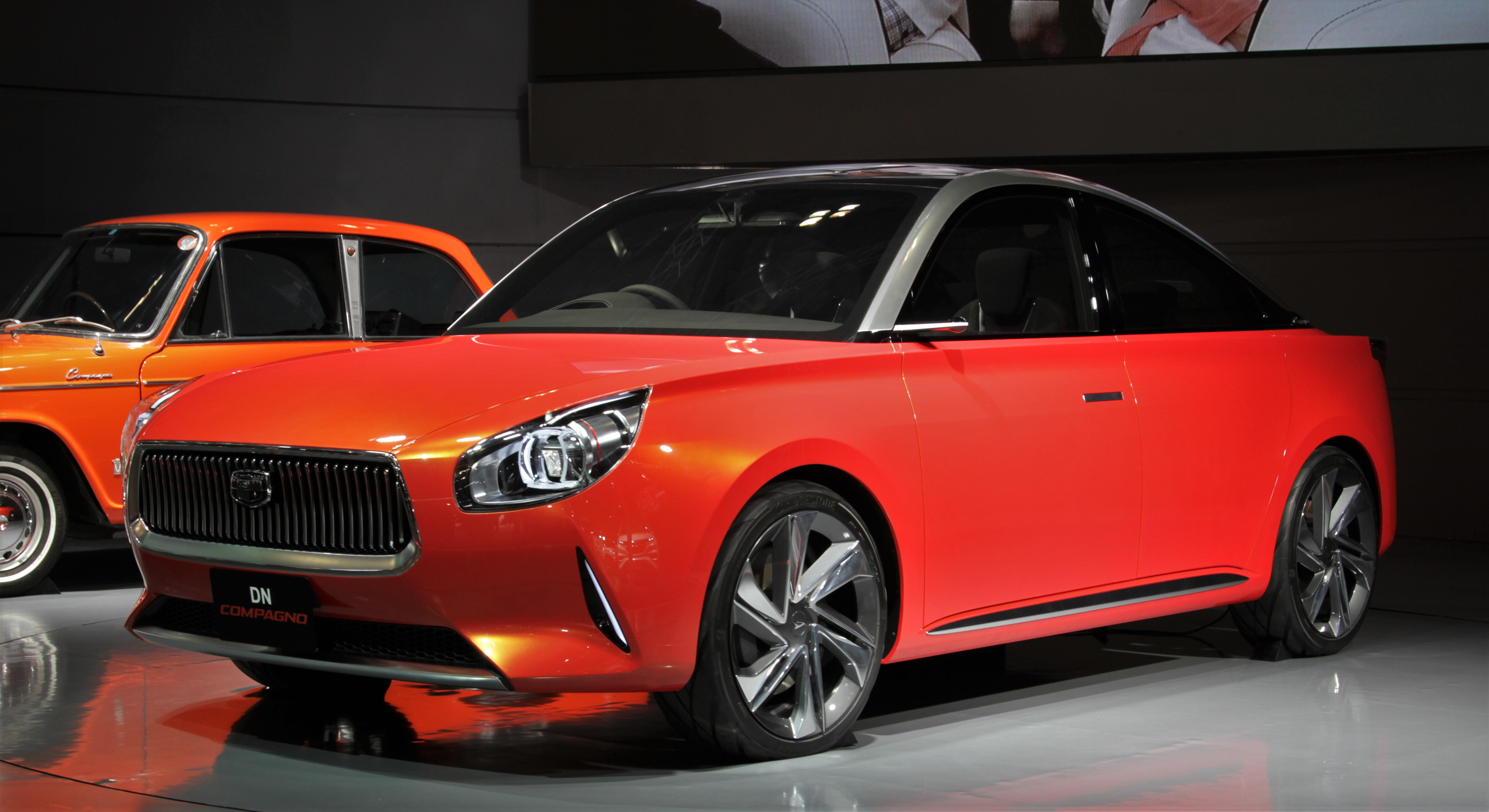
2017 Daihatsu DN Compagno

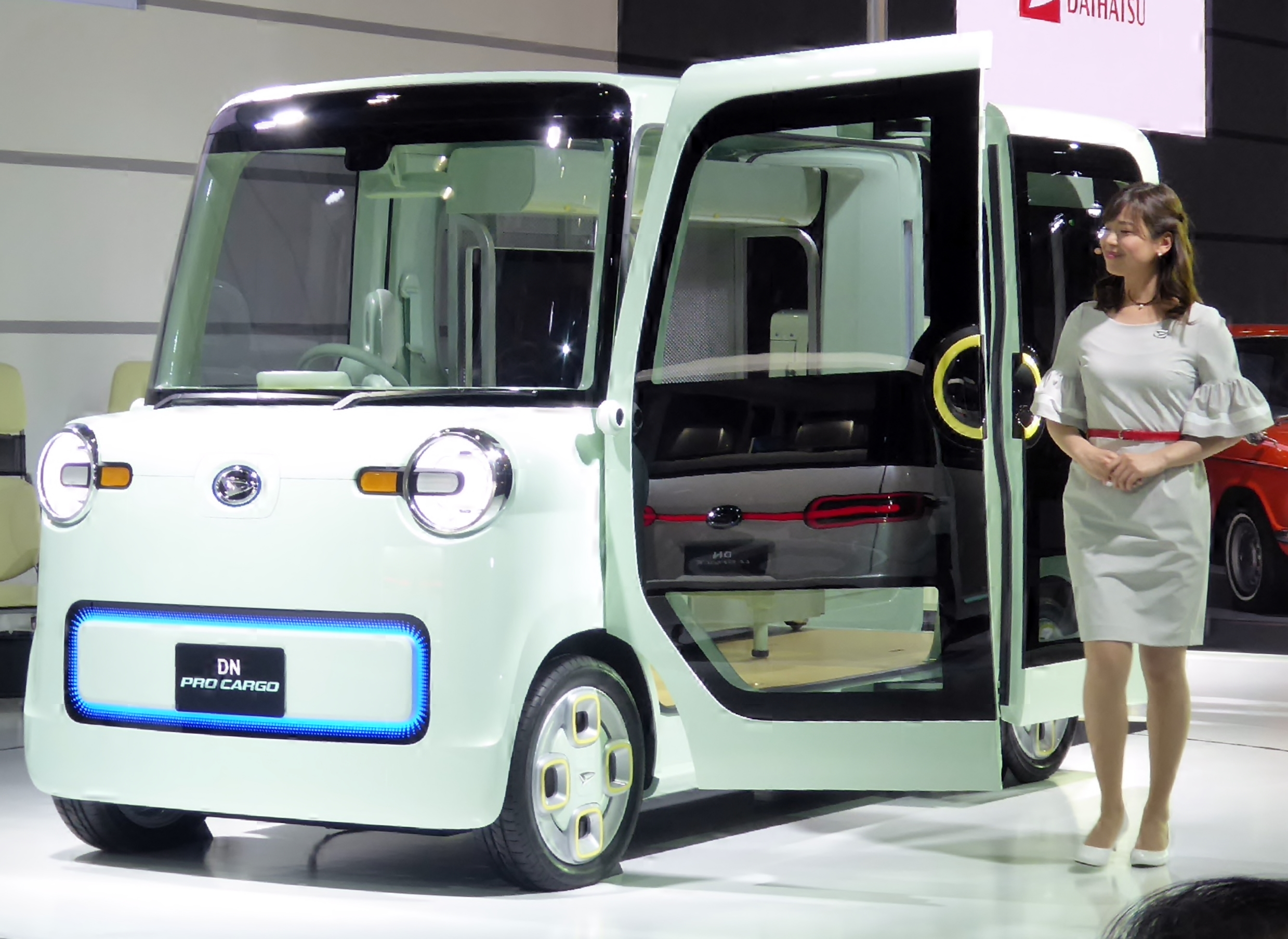
2017 Daihatsu DN ProCargo

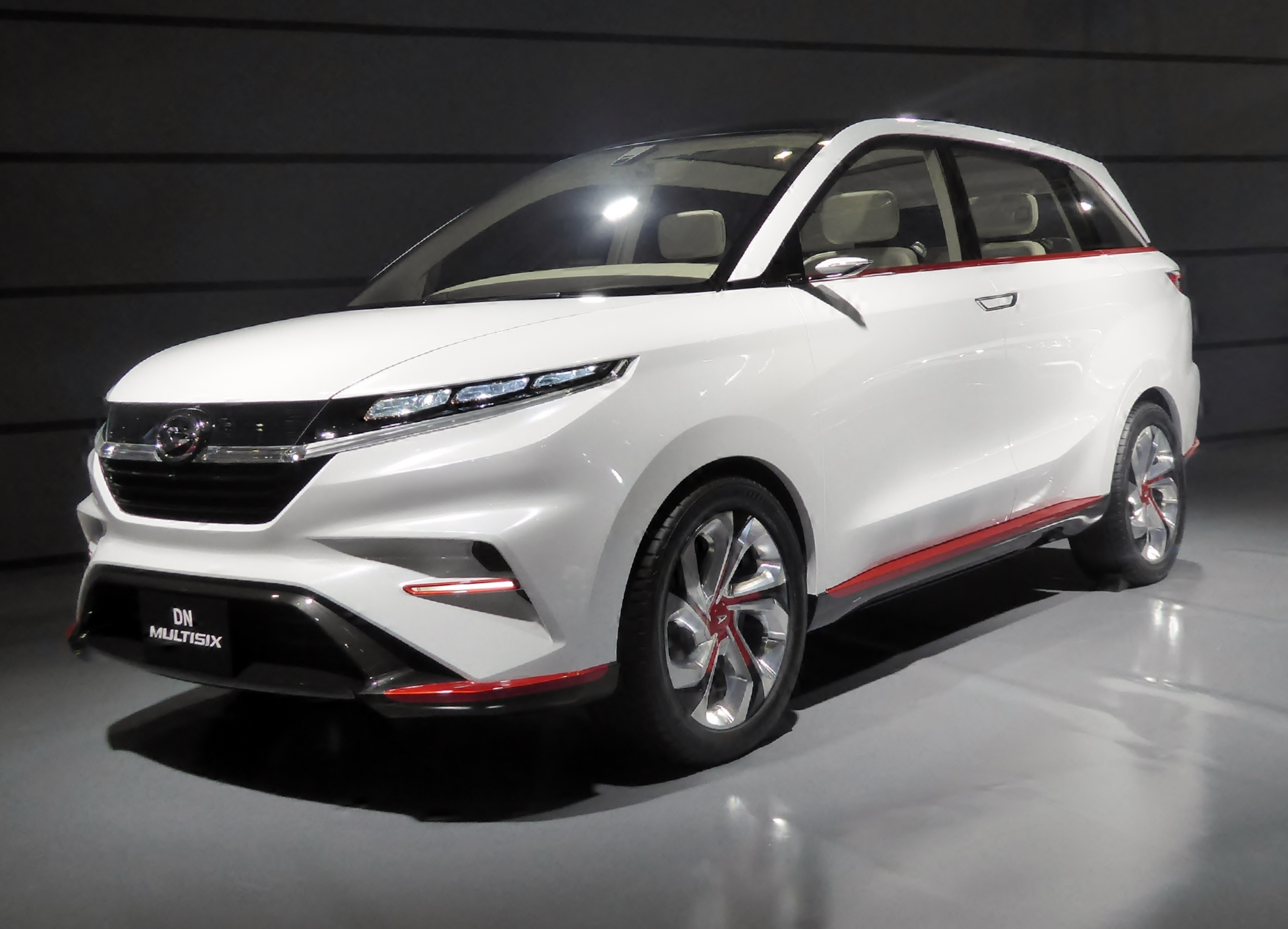
2017 Daihatsu DN MultiSix

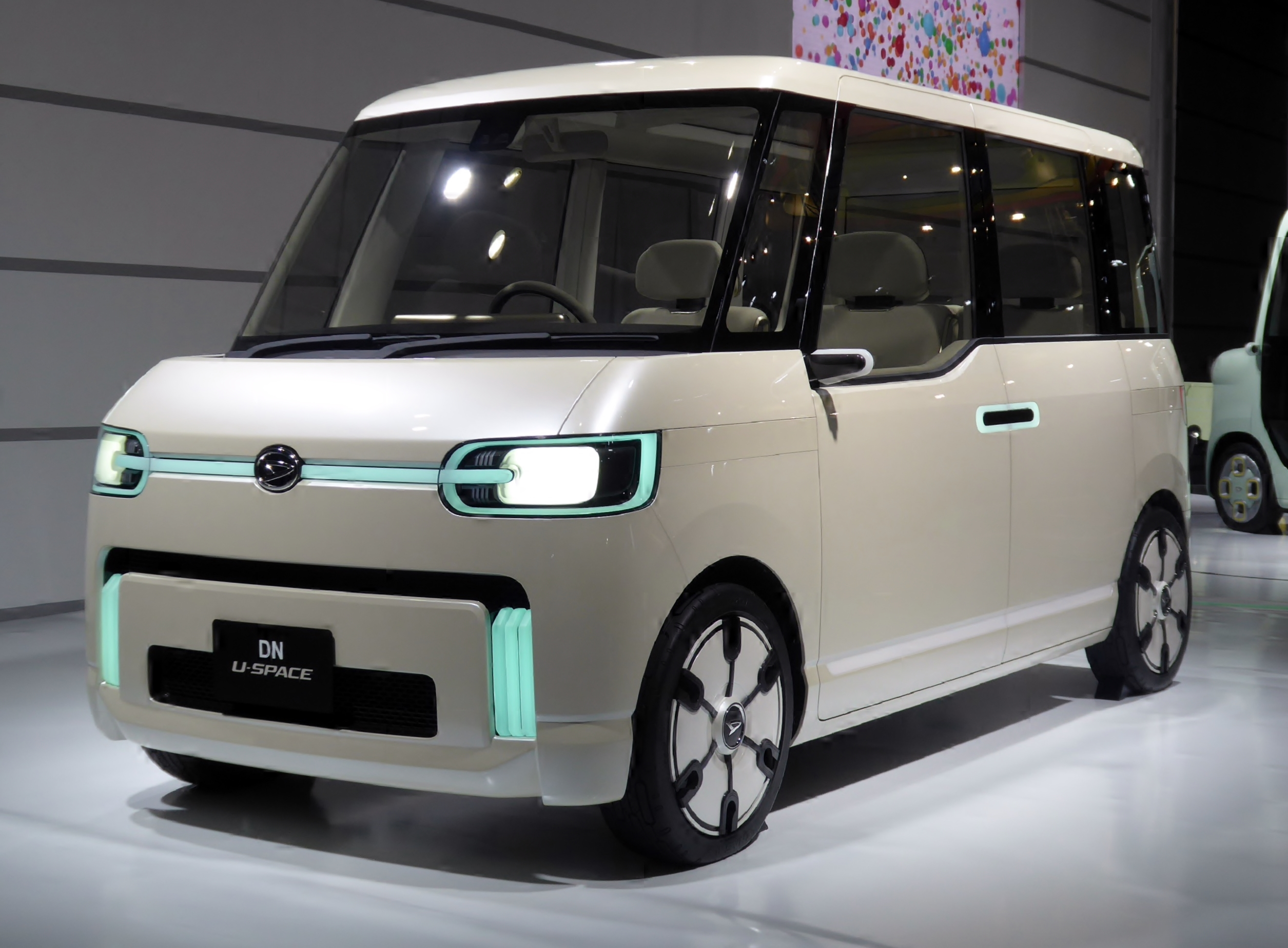
2017 Daihatsu DN U-SPACE

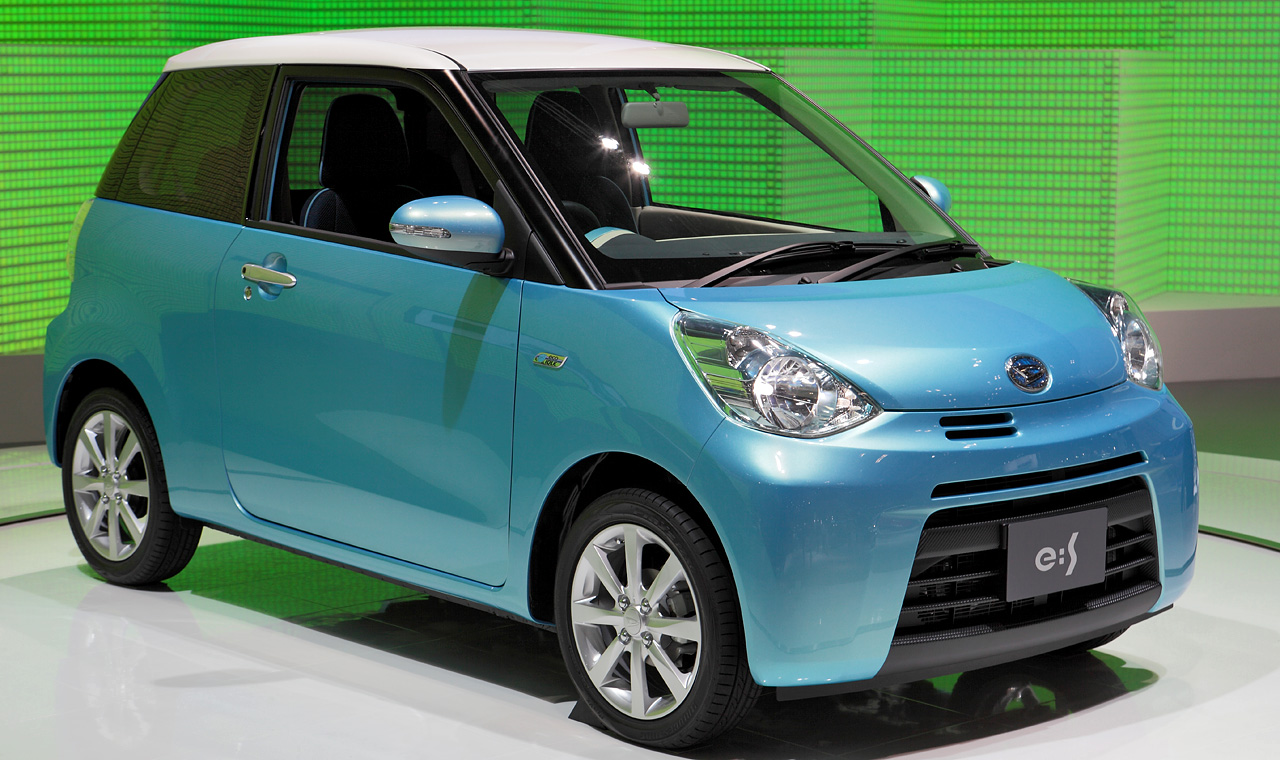
2009 Daihatsu e:S

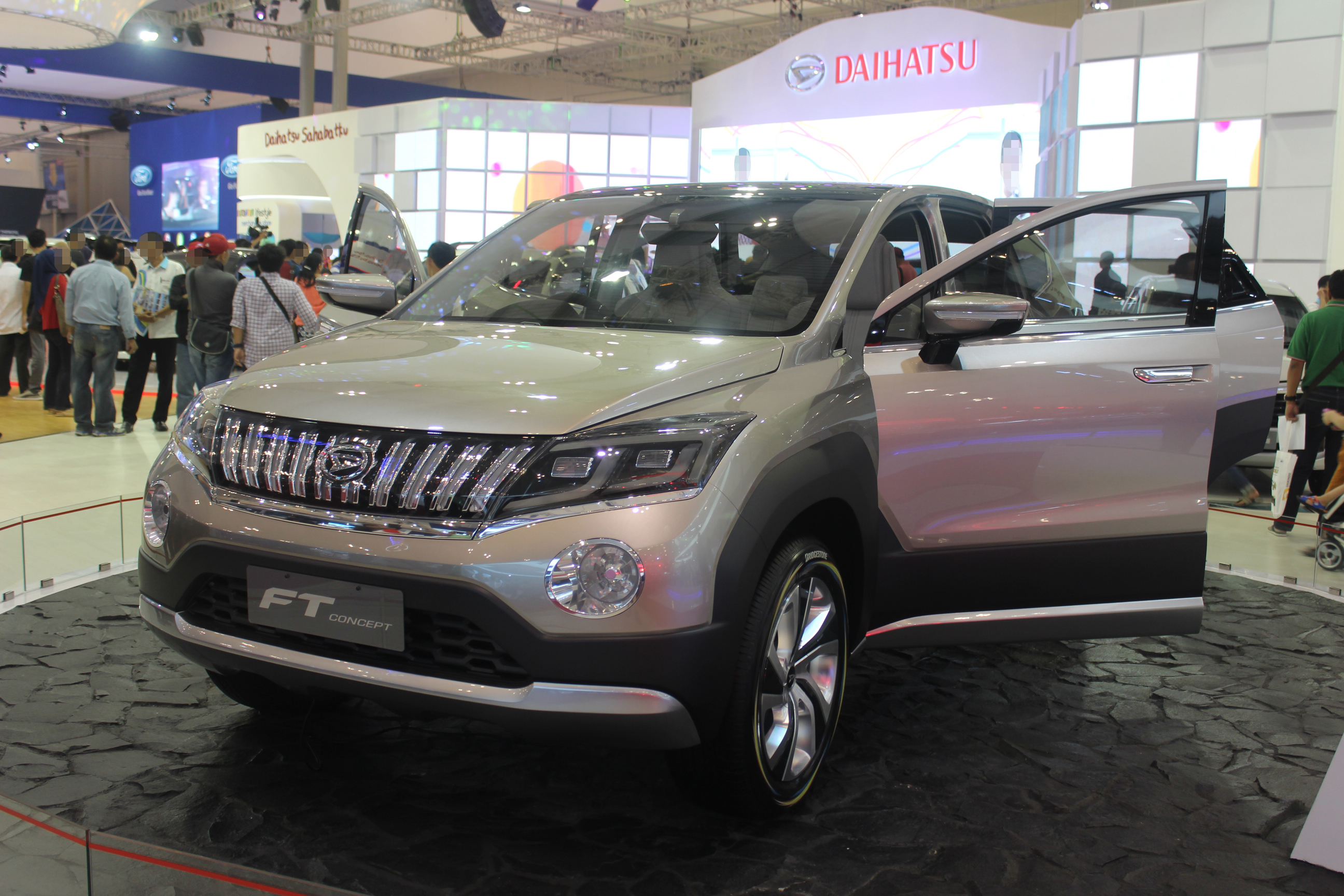
2015 Daihatsu FT Concept

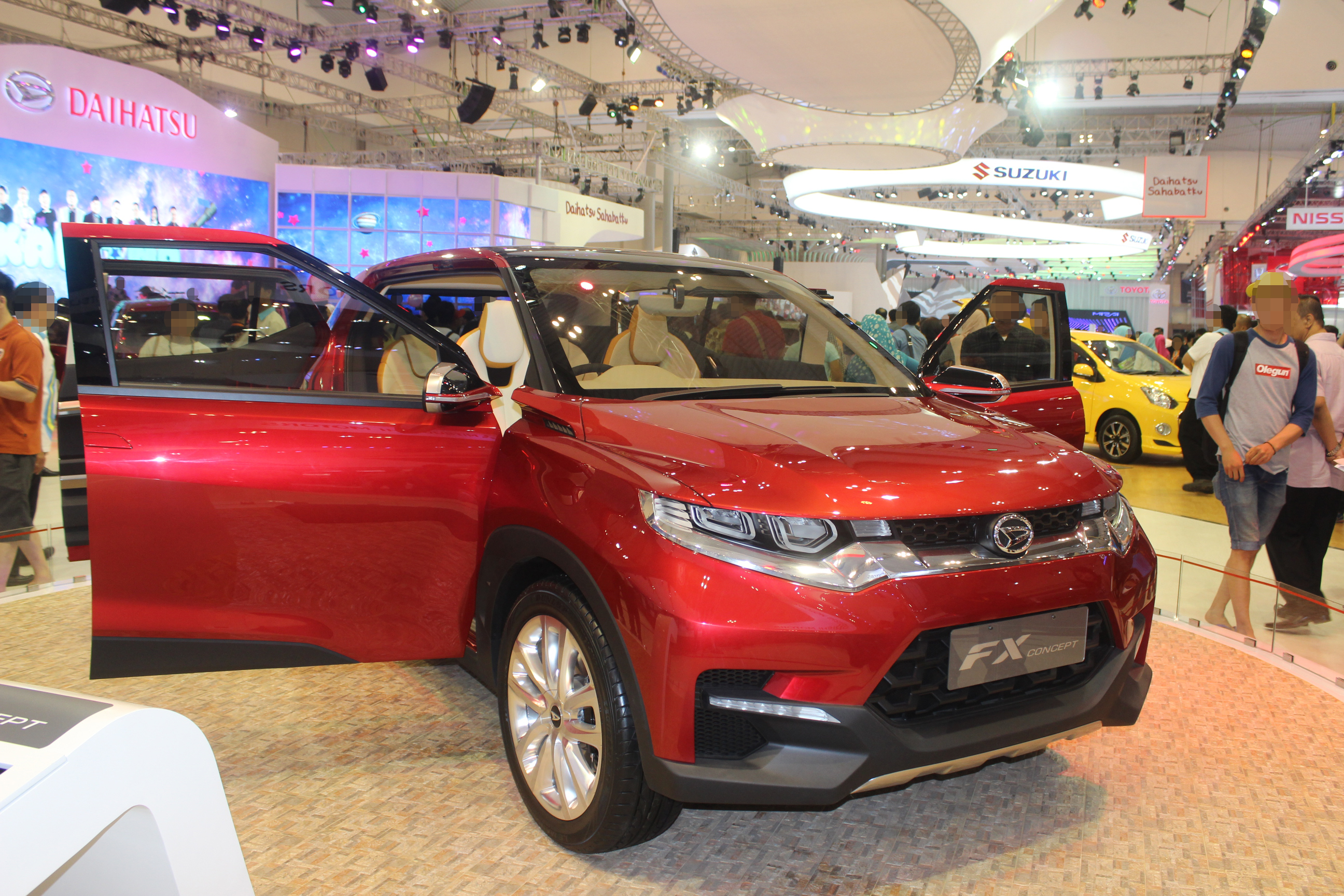
2015 Daihatsu FX Concept

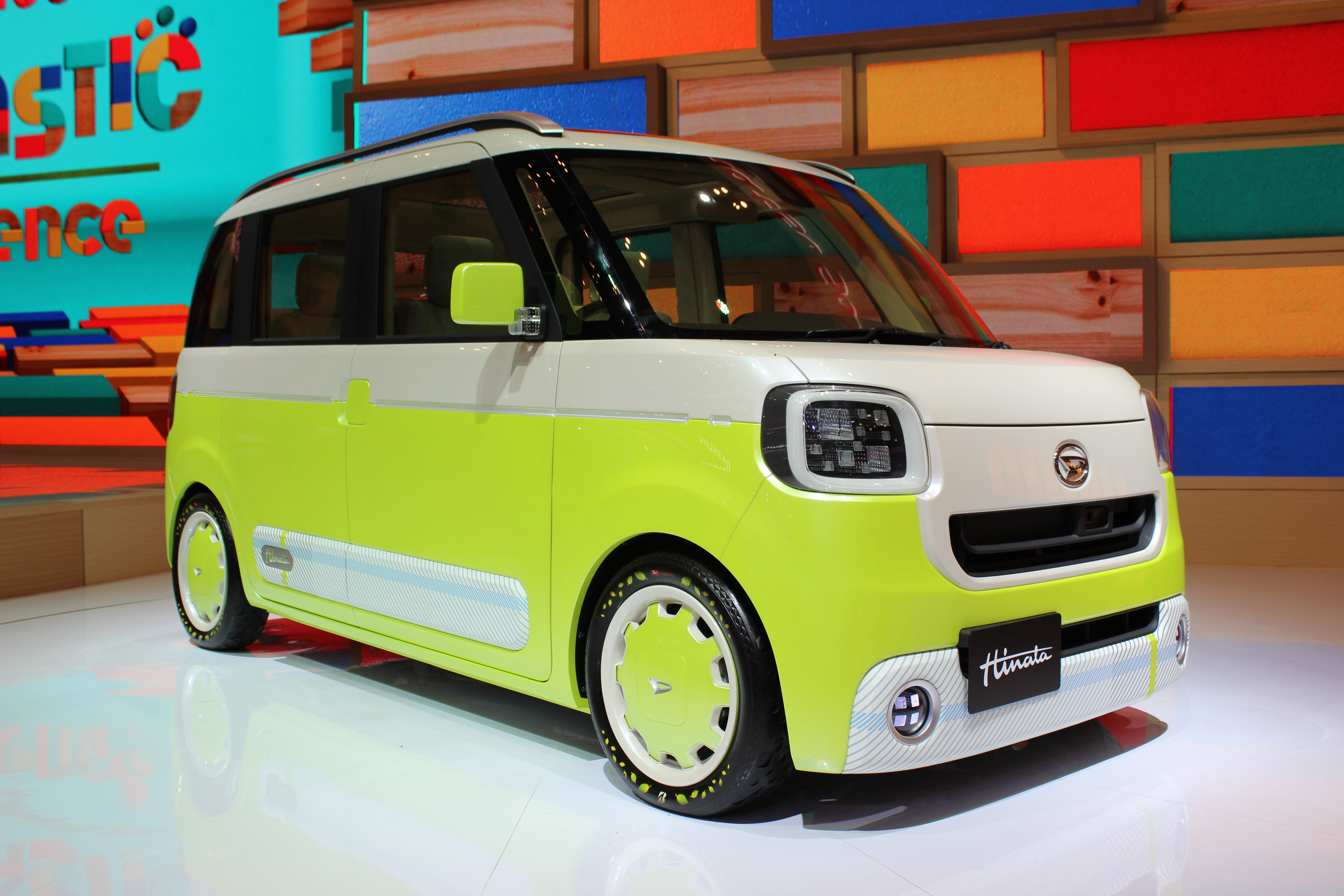
2016 Daihatsu Hinata

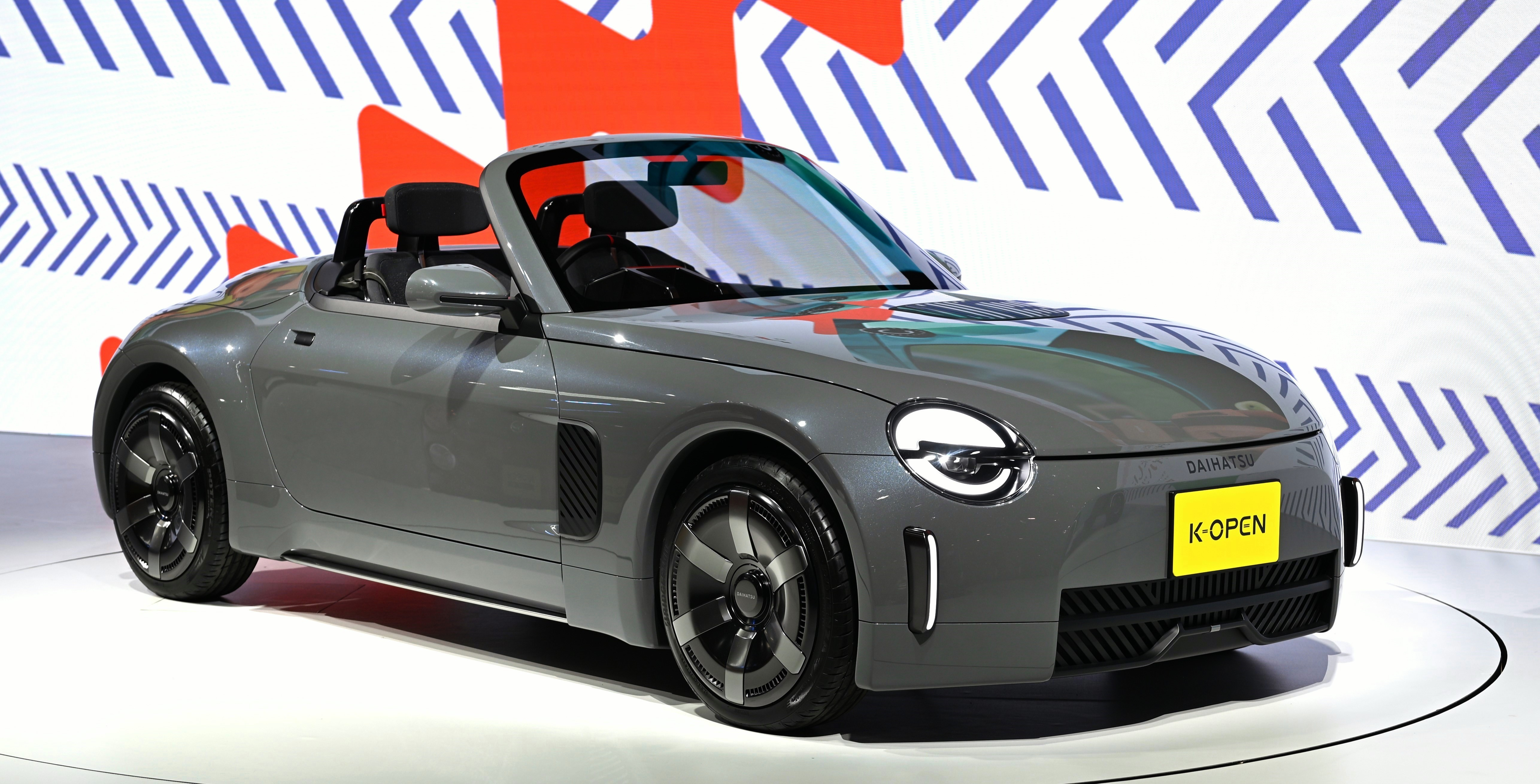
2025 Daihatsu K-Open

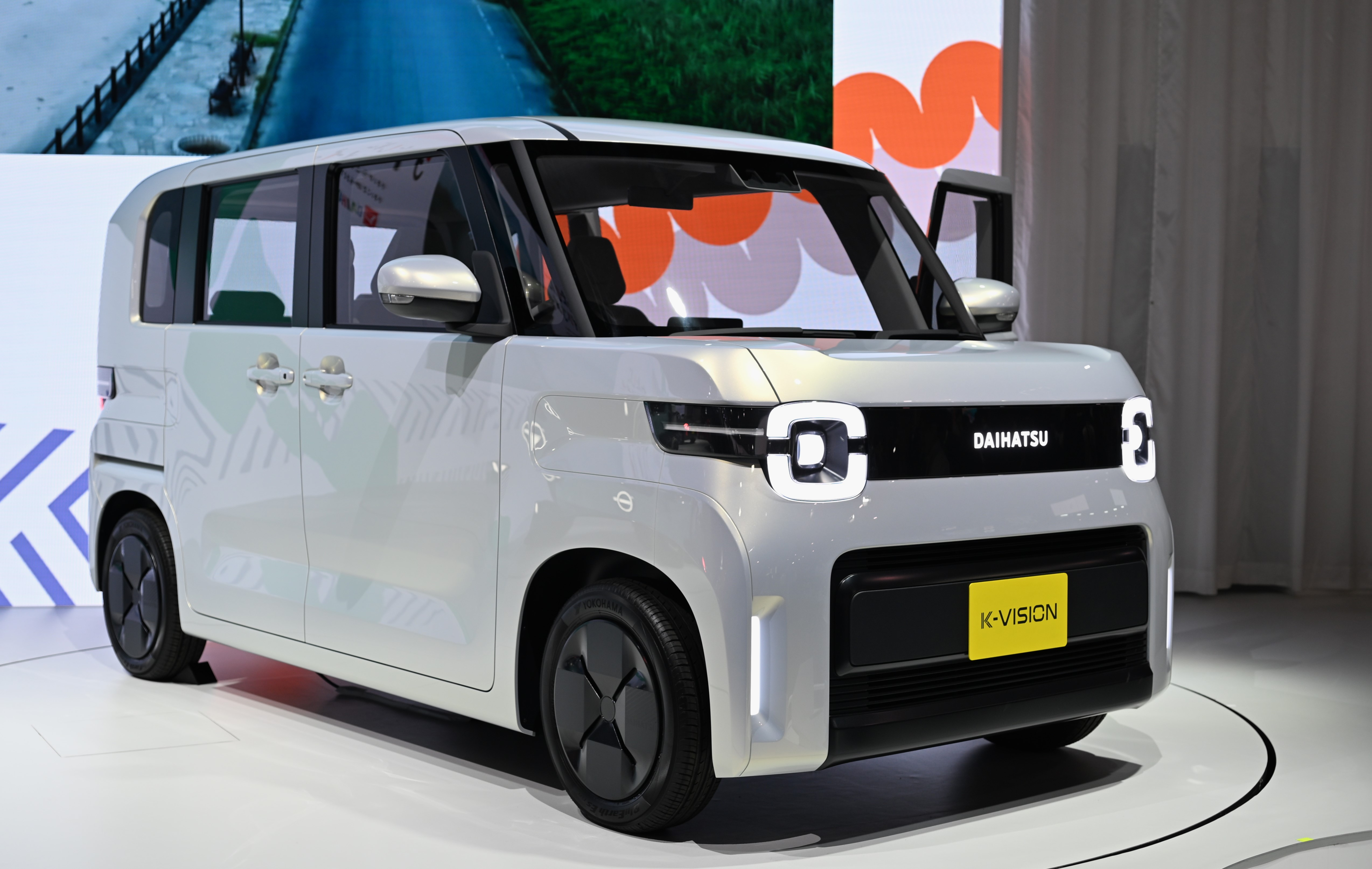
2025 Daihatsu K-Vision

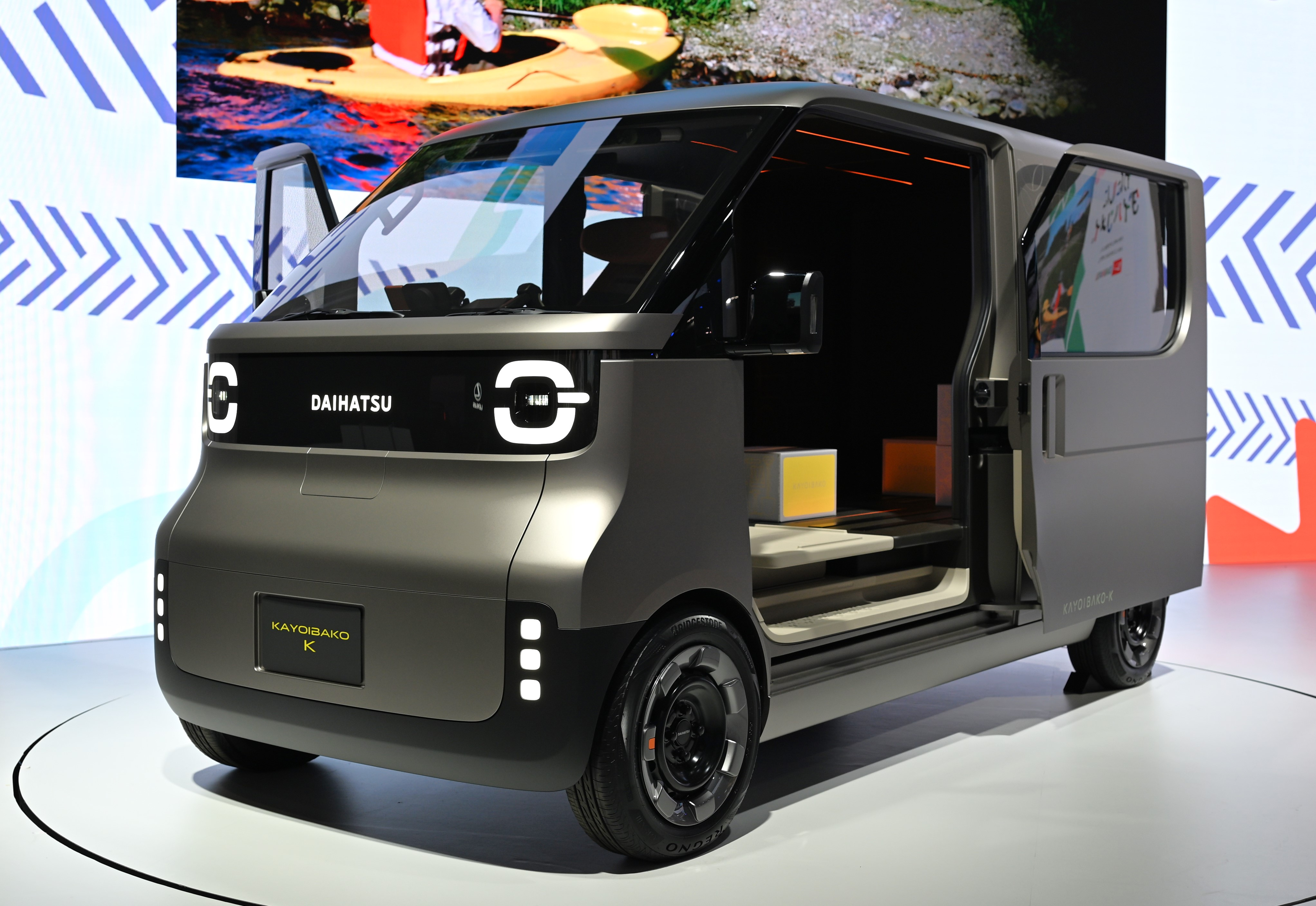
2025 Daihatsu Kayoibako-K

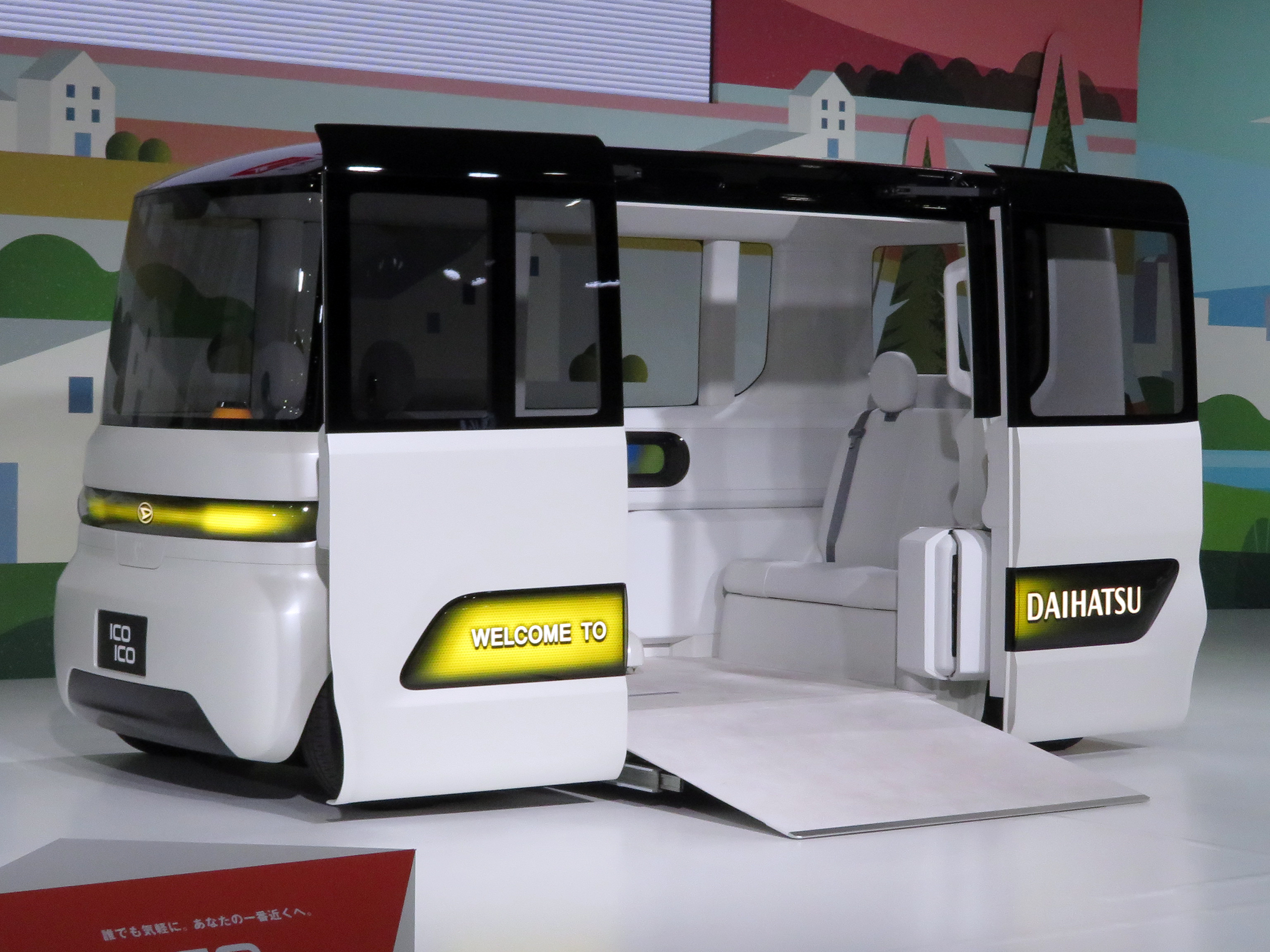
2019 Daihatsu IcoIco

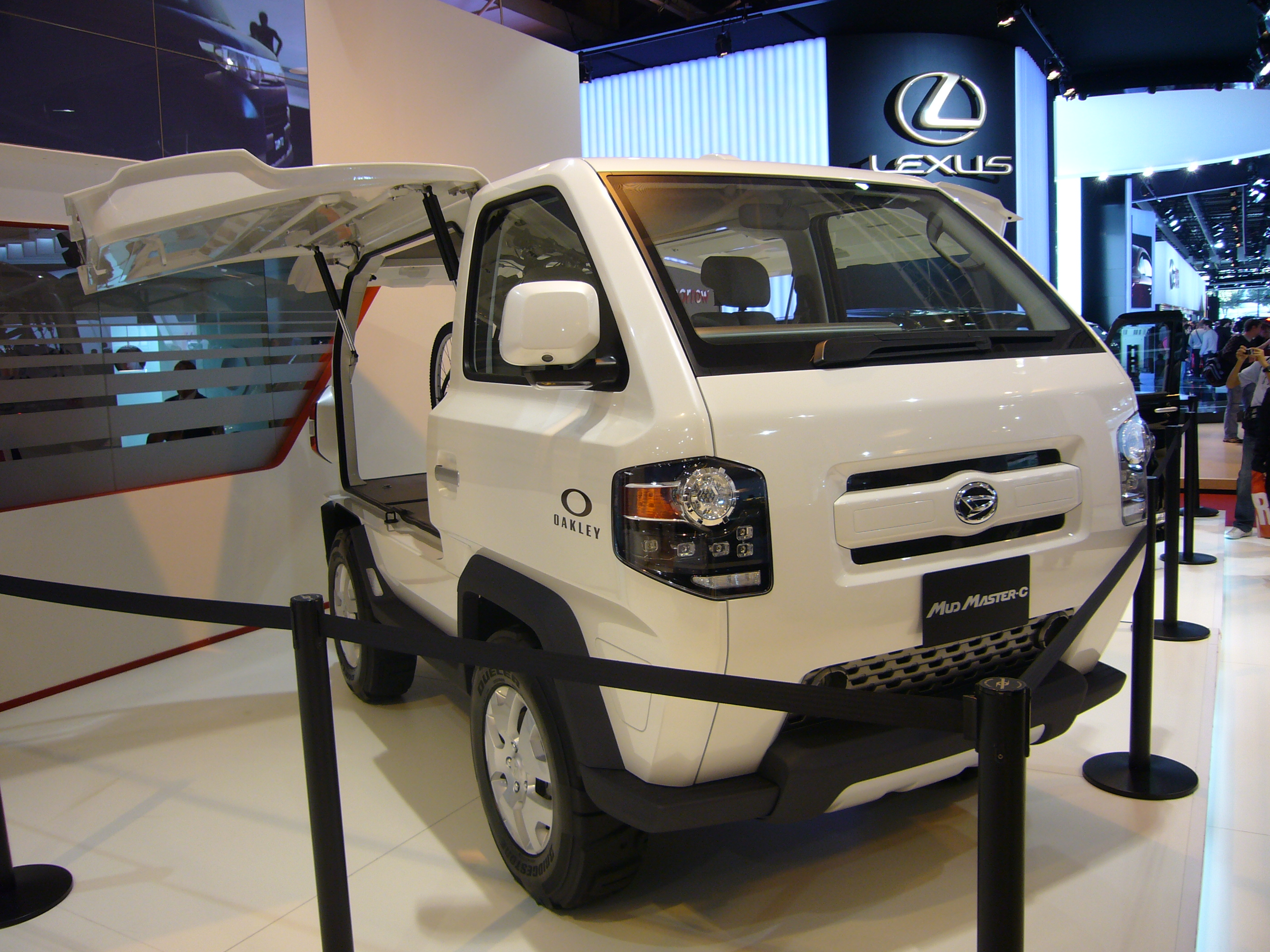
2007 Daihatsu Mud Master-C

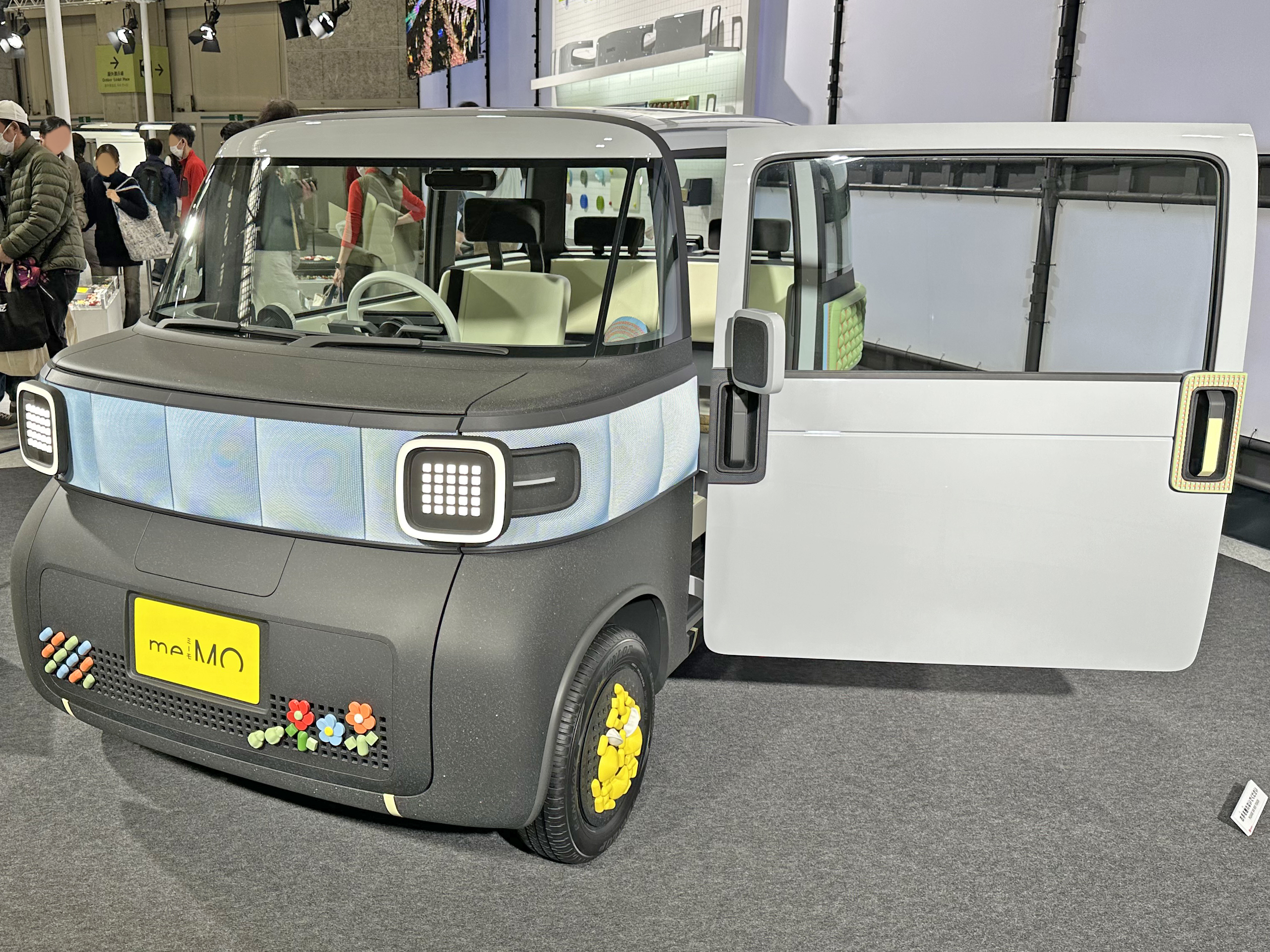
2023 Daihatsu me:MO

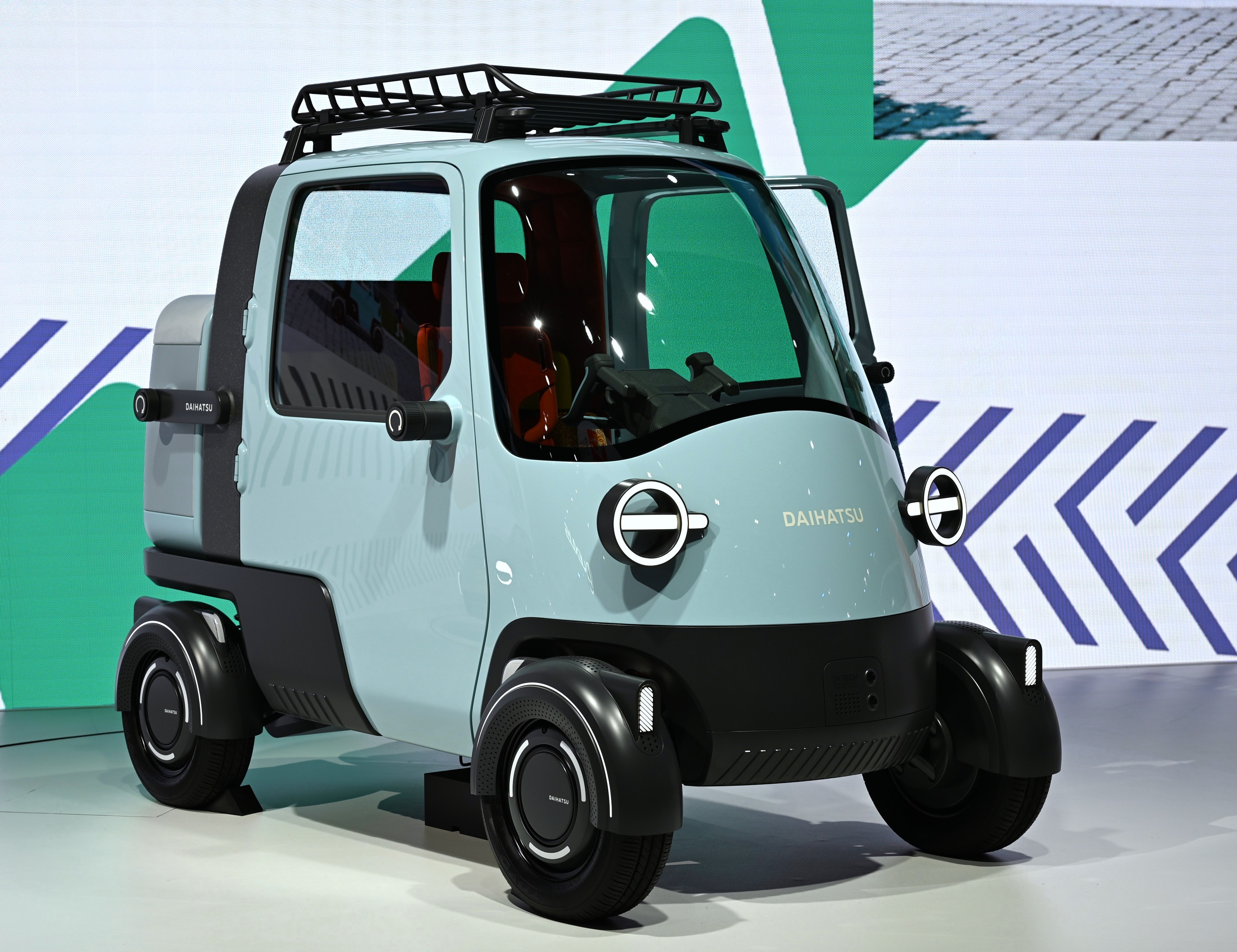
2025 Daihatsu Midget X

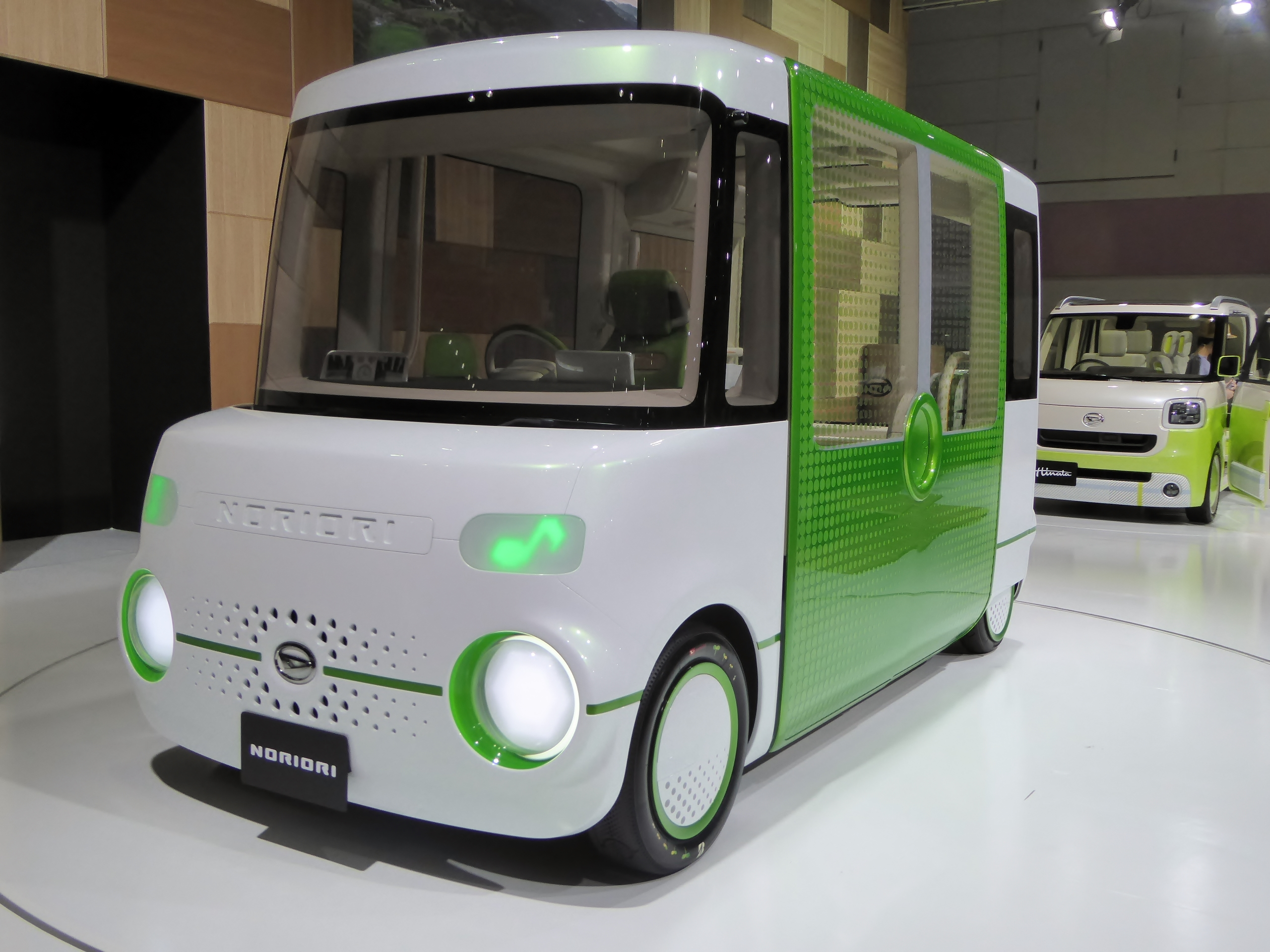
2015 Daihatsu Noriori

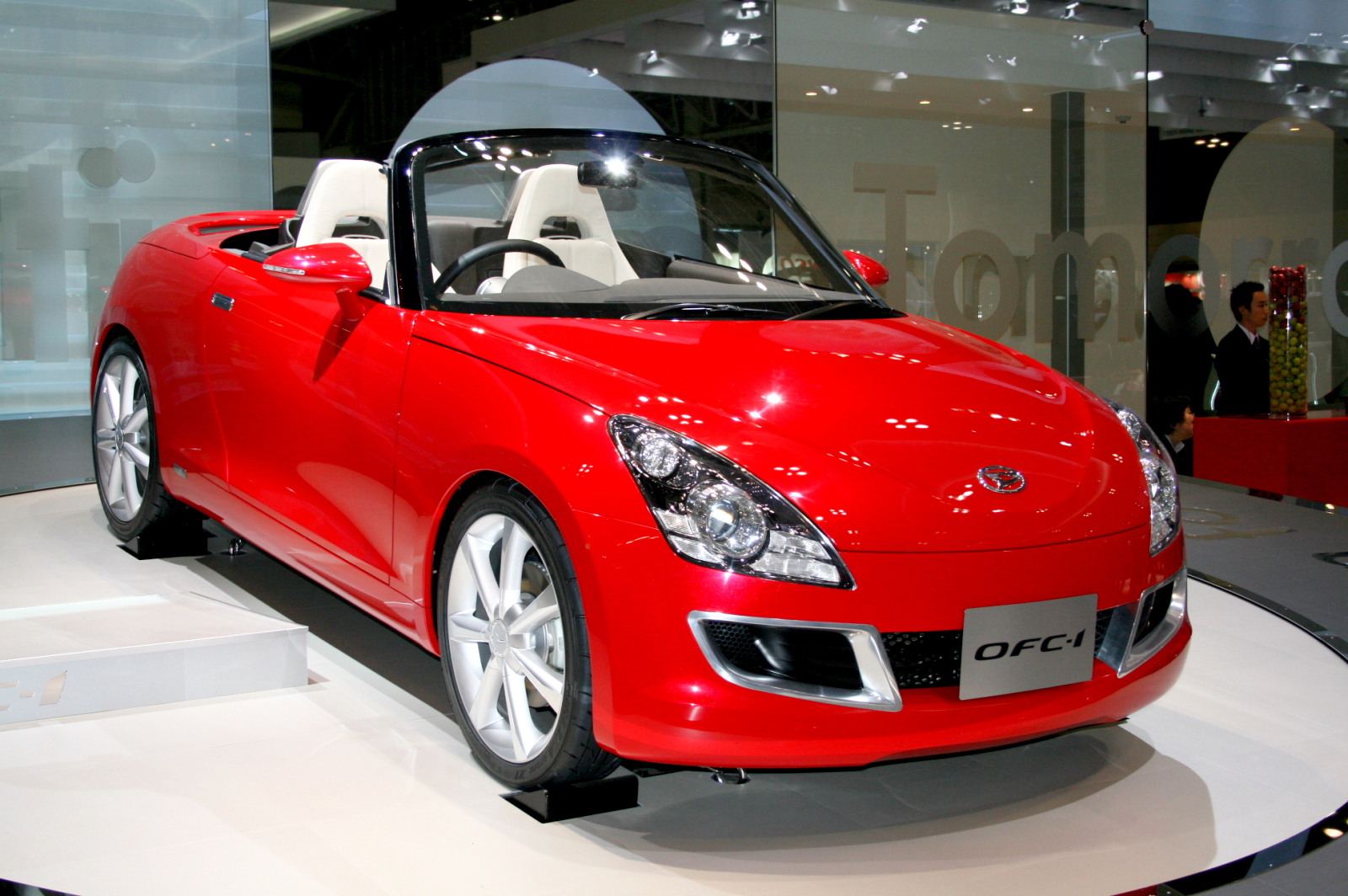
2007 Daihatsu OFC-1

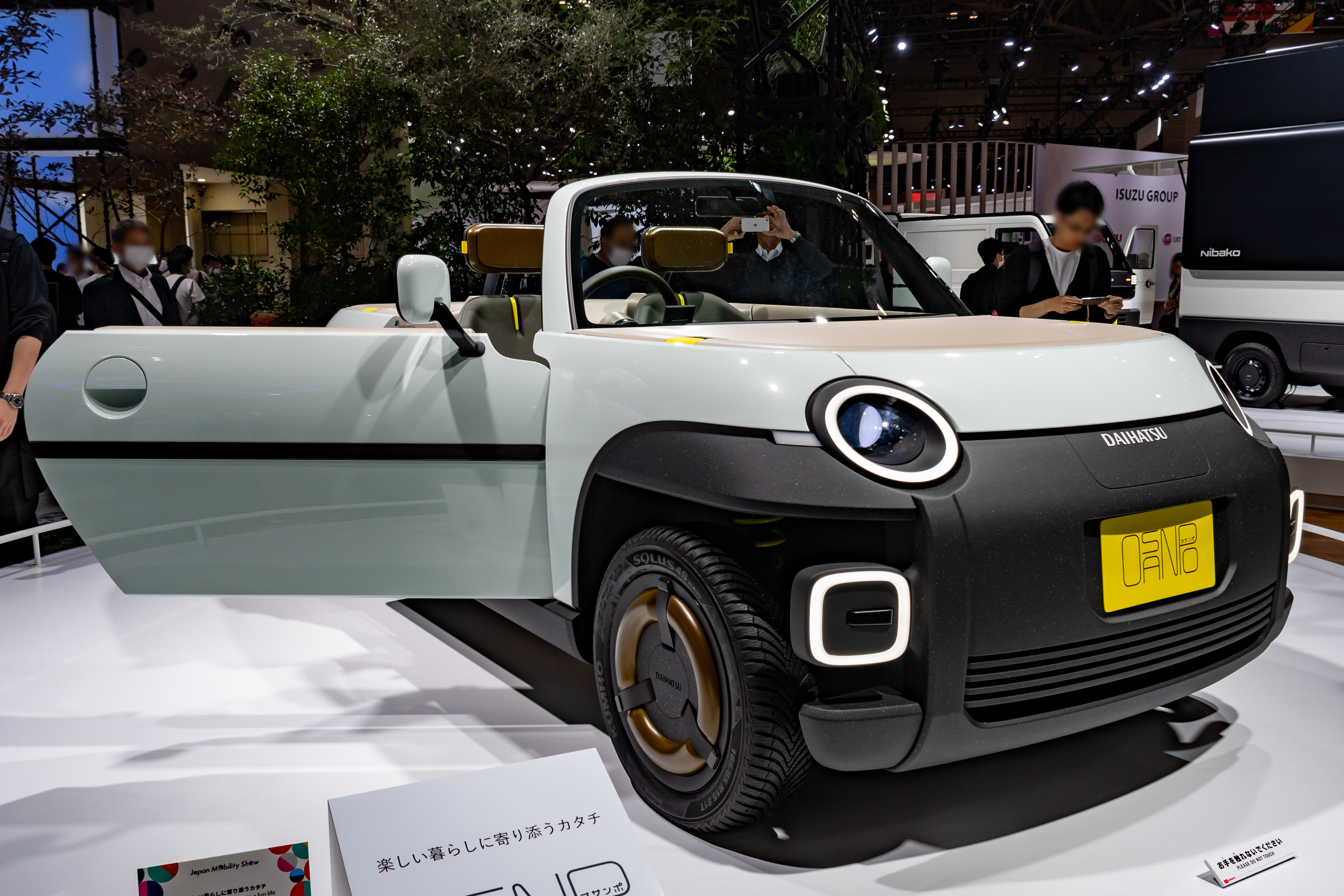
2023 Daihatsu Osanpo

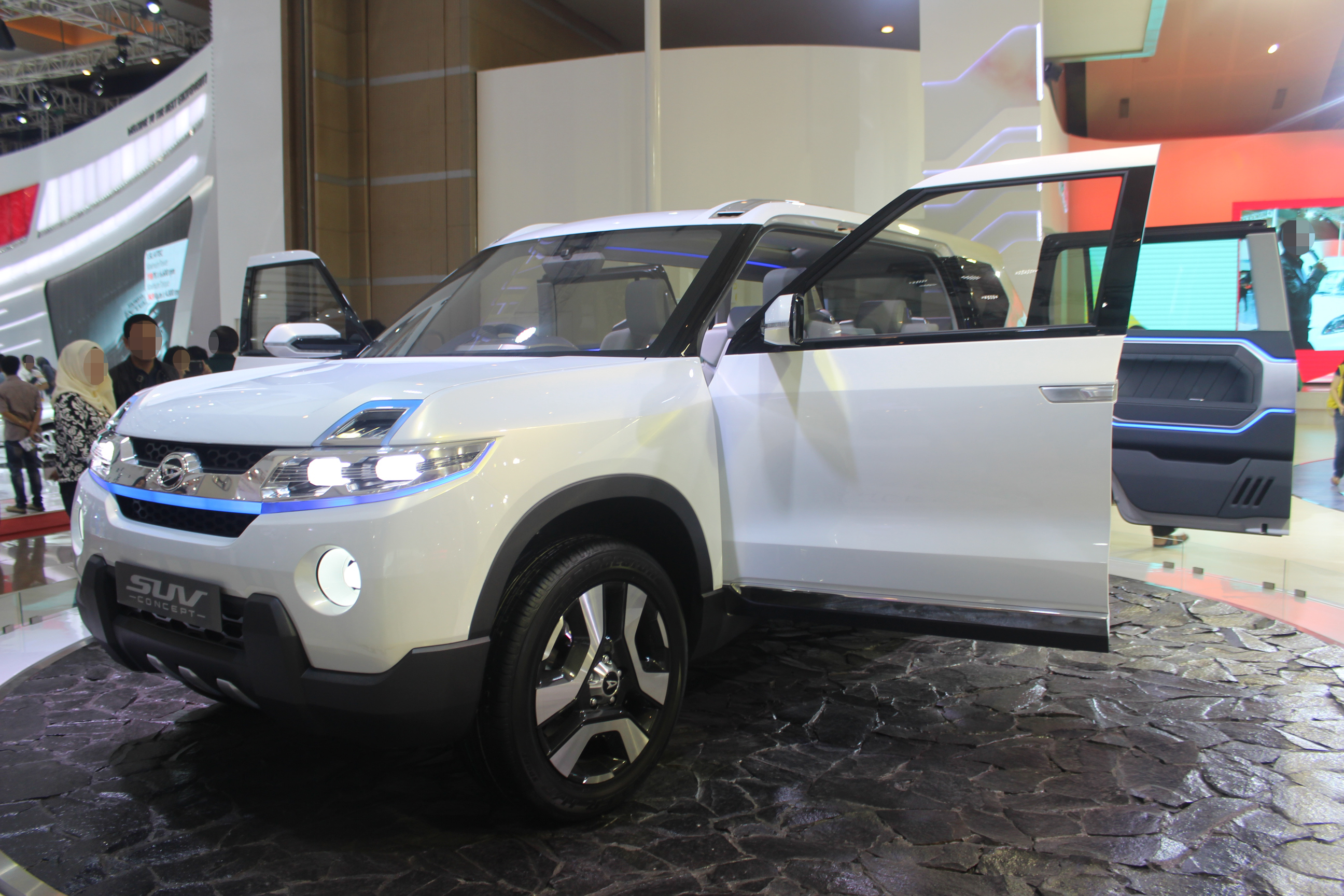
2014 Daihatsu SUV

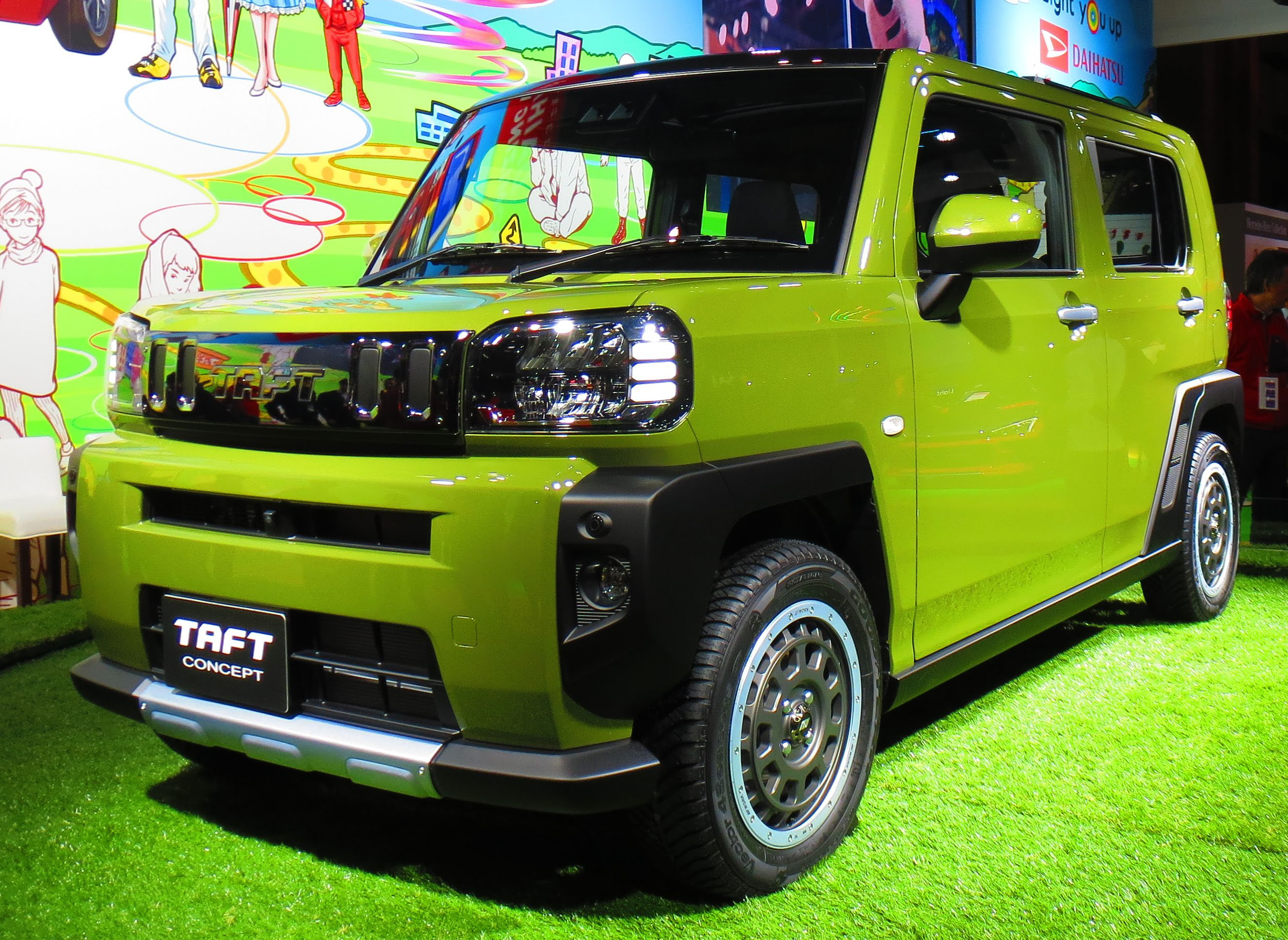
2020 Daihatsu Taft Concept

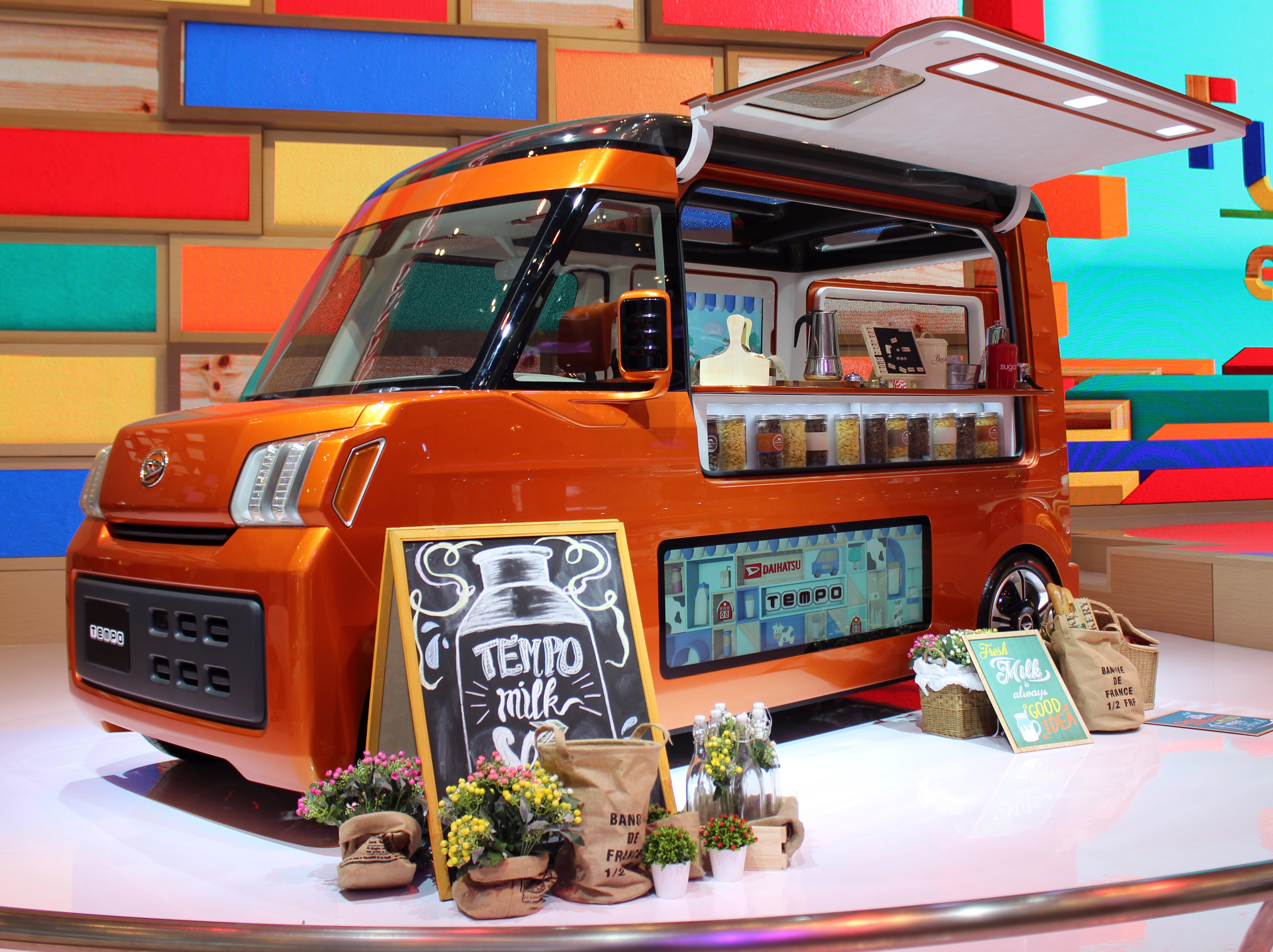
2016 Daihatsu Tempo

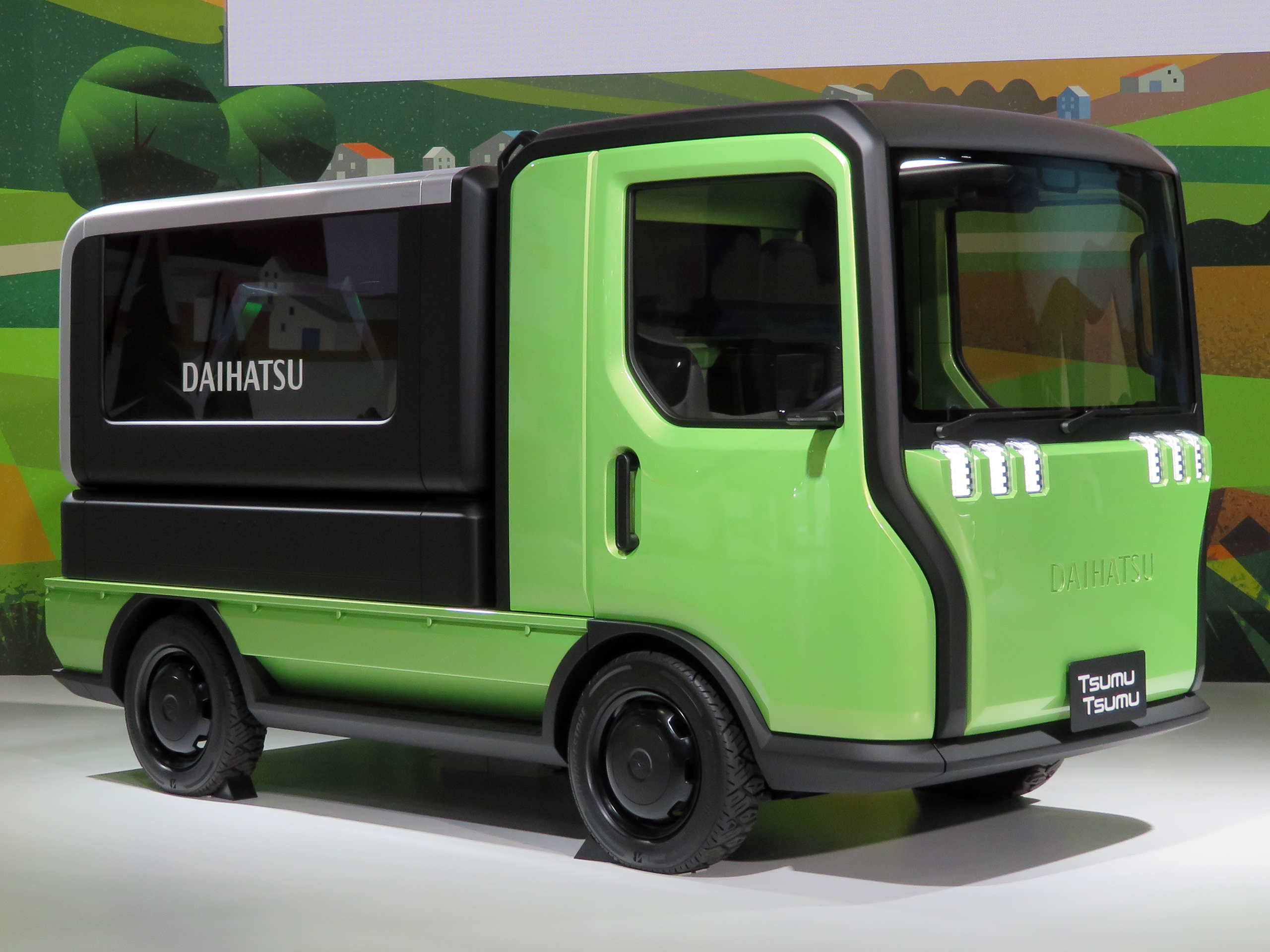
2019 Daihatsu TsumuTsumu

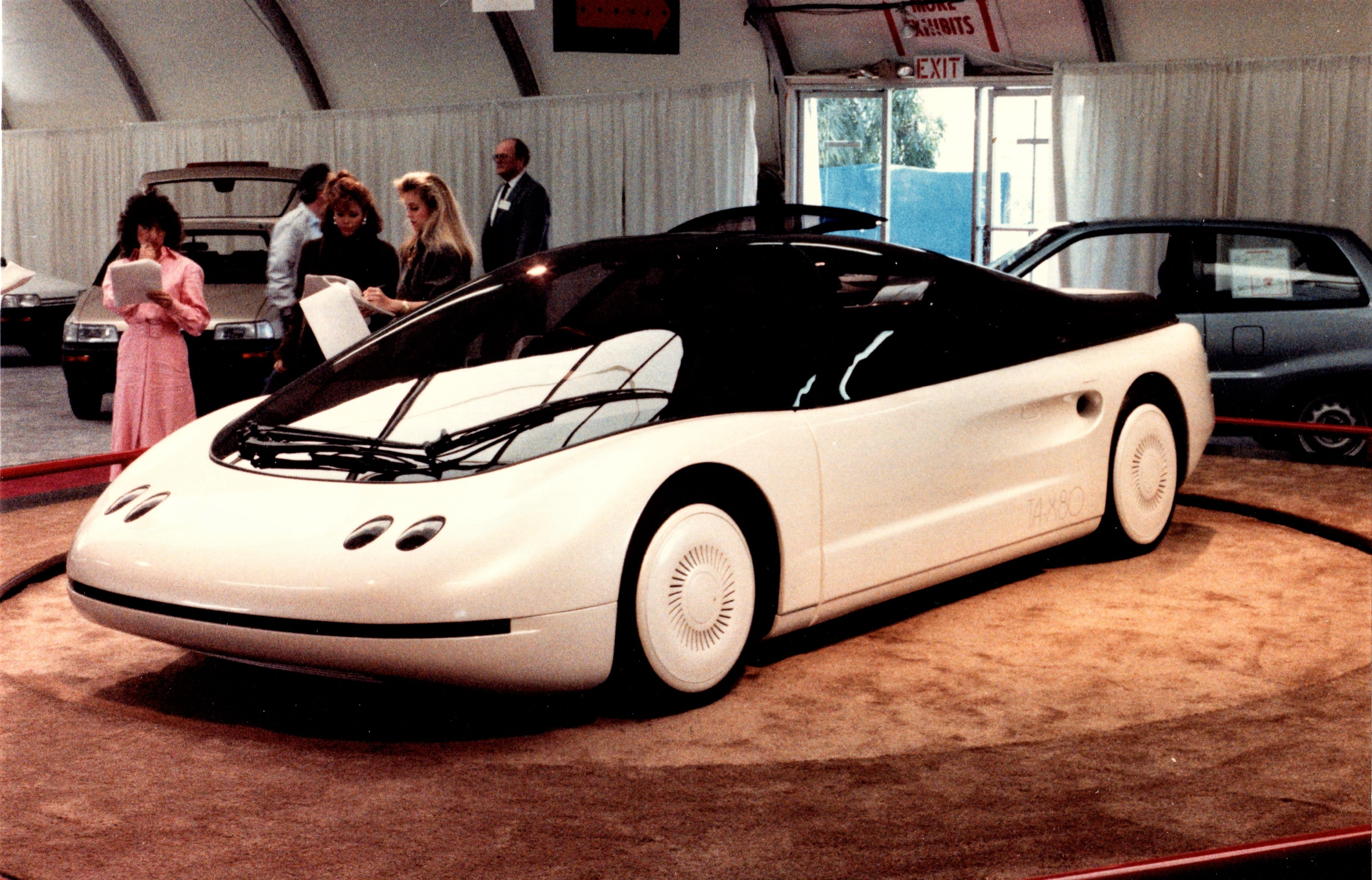
1987 Daihatsu TA-X80

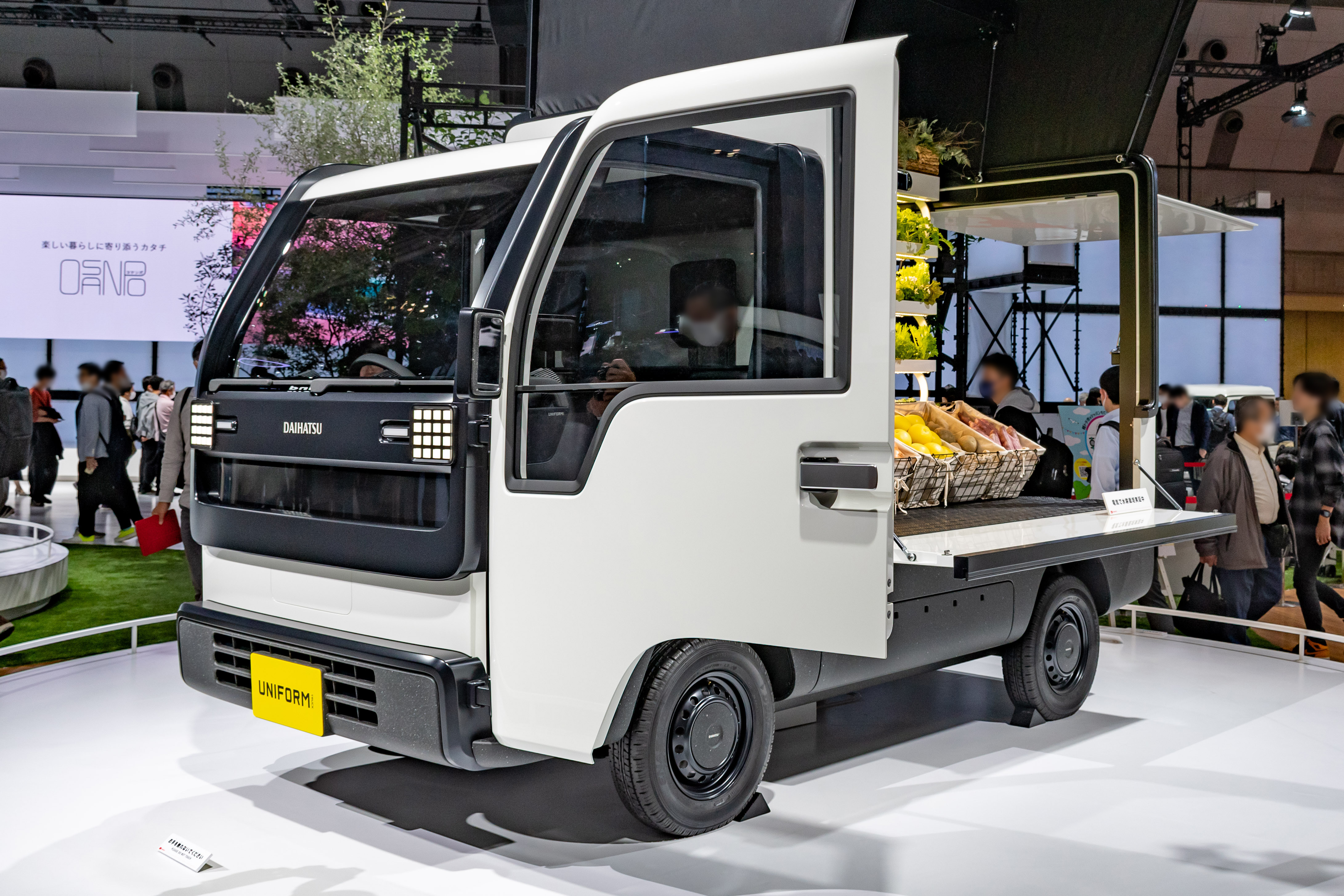
2023 Daihatsu Uniform

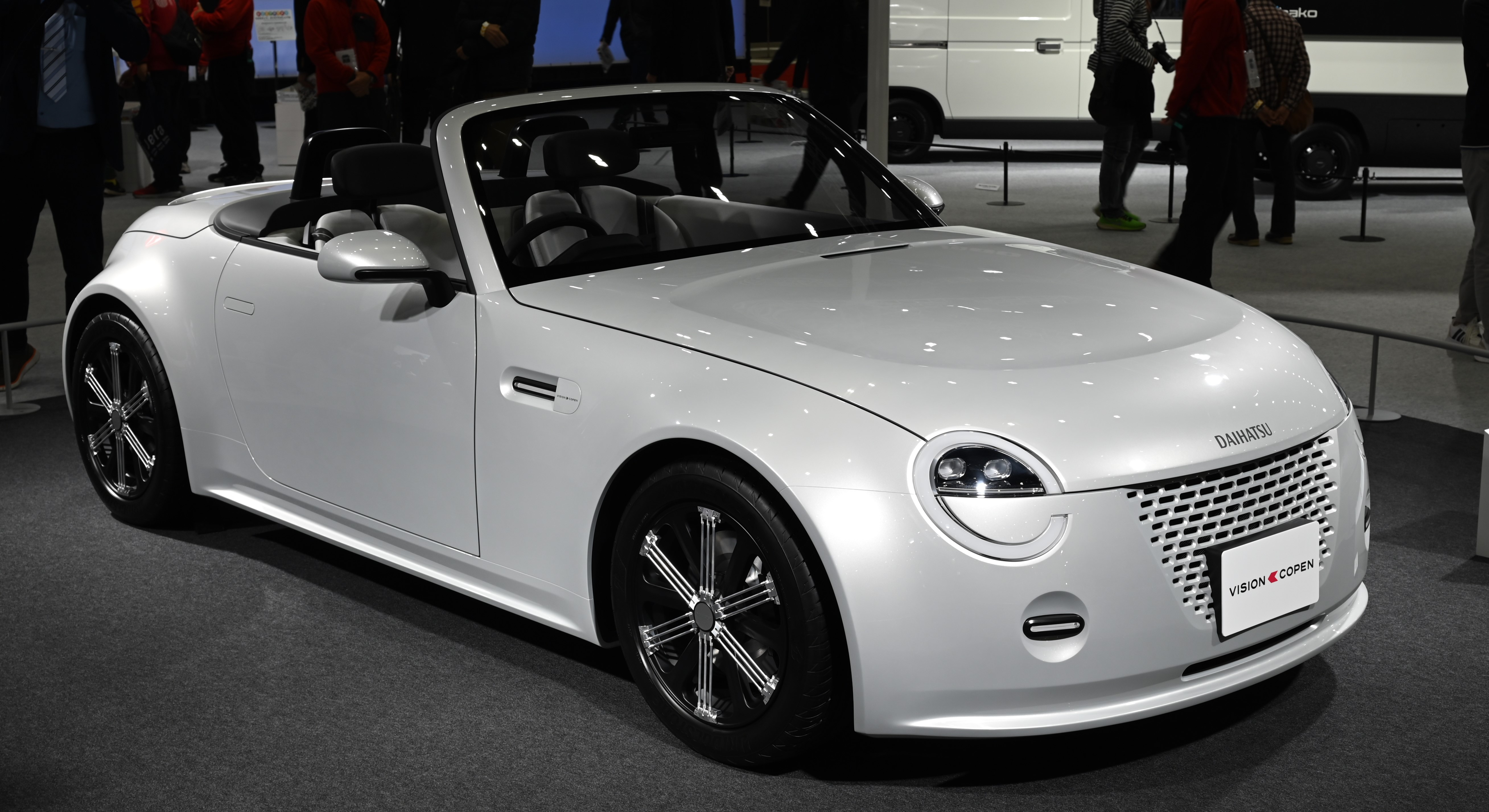
2023 Daihatsu Vision Copen

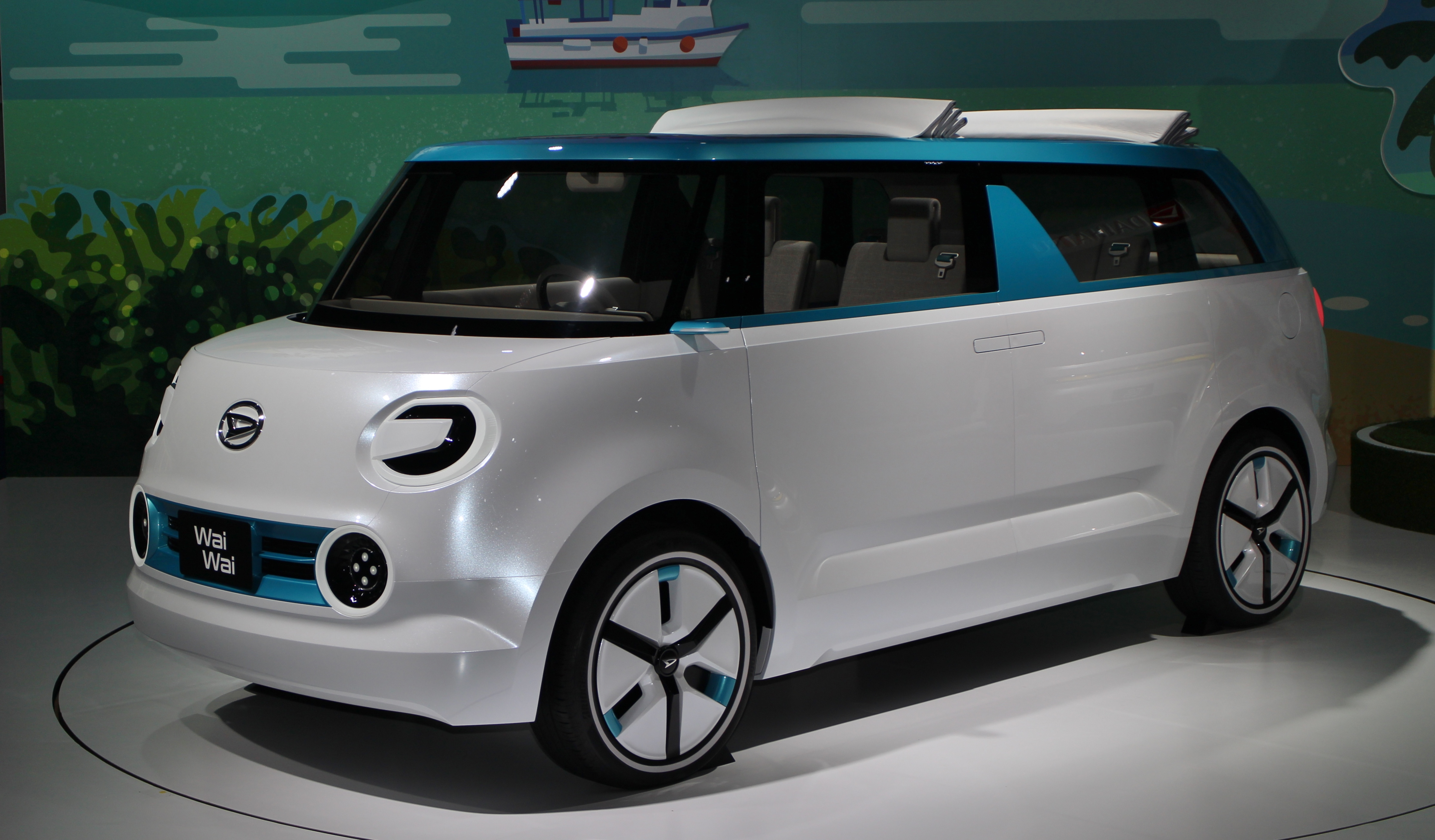
2019 Daihatsu WaiWai

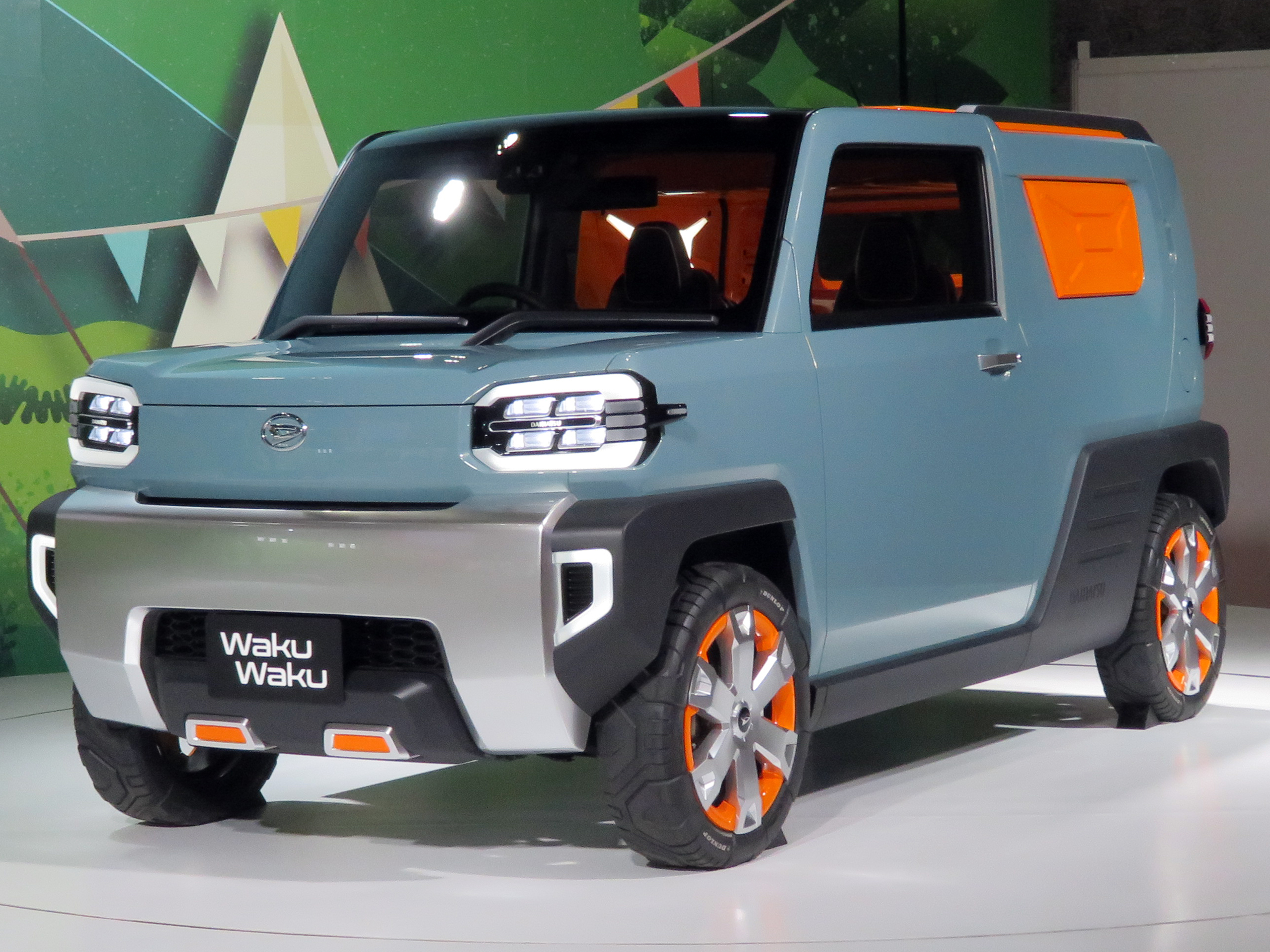
2019 Daihatsu WakuWaku

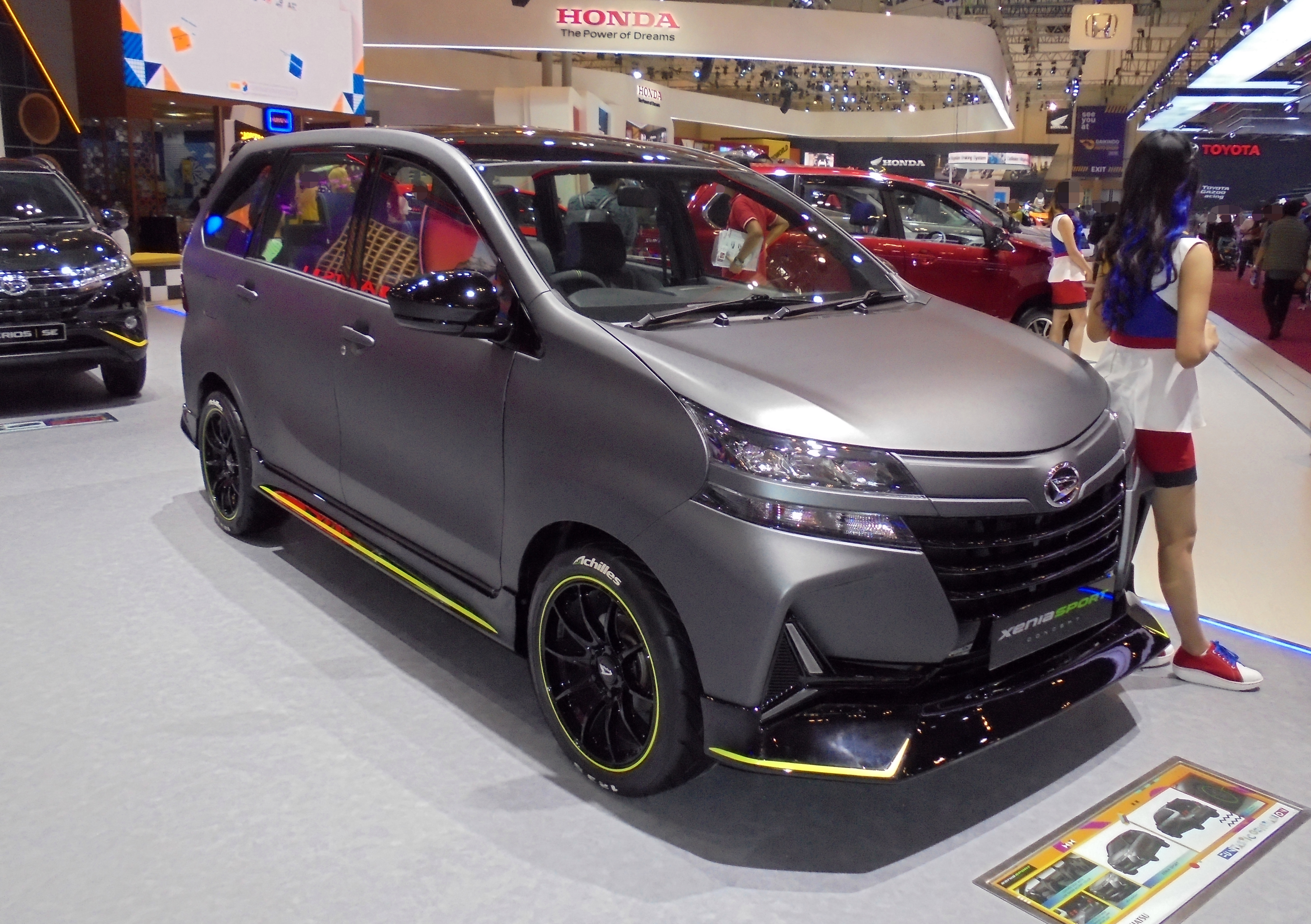
2019 Daihatsu Xenia Sport
