= Daihatsu Costa =

The Daihatsu Costa is a concept car introduced at the 2005 Tokyo Motor Show. It is basically a city car designed to be taken to the beach.

The Costa weighs 1,654 pounds (750 kg) and has no doors, similar to a golf cart. It is powered by a 660 cc turbocharged 3-cylinder engine. Its light weight and comparatively powerful engine make it relatively fast for its size.

There are no plans to bring the Costa into production.
