= Daihatsu UFE-III =

UFE-III

Overview
- Manufacturer: Daihatsu
- Also called: Ultra Fuel Economy
- Production: 2005 (Concept car)

Body and chassis
- Class: Kei car
- Body style: 1-door hatchback
- Layout: FF layout
- Doors: Canopy

Powertrain
- Engine: 660cc Atkinson I3 (hybrid gasoline / electric)
- Electric motor: 2
- Battery: 1 × nickel–metal hydride

Dimensions
- Length: 3,395 mm (133.7 in)
- Width: 1,475 mm (58.1 in)
- Height: 1,200 mm (47.2 in)
- Kerb weight: 440 kg (970 lb)

Chronology
- Predecessor: UFE-II (2003)

The UFE-III (Ultra Fuel Economy-third generation) is a mini-hybrid concept car being developed by Daihatsu. The vehicle can transport three people (one driver, and two passengers in the rear). The hybrid system comprises a 660-cubic centimeter direct-injection gasoline engine, two motors, and a nickel–metal hydride battery. Daihatsu estimates the UFE-III's fuel economy at 72 kilometres per litre (170 mpg_{‑US}). The body is in polymer and ultra-light aluminum with a canopy door and pointed LED headlamps. The UFE-III has an aerodynamic drag coefficient (Cd) of 0.168 and is controlled by steer-by-wire technology. Third generation of the "Ultra Fuel Economy" UFE, it was first shown in October 2005 at the Tokyo Motor Show.
