= Daihatsu C-series engine =

Range of internal combustion piston engines

The Daihatsu C-series engine is a range of compact three-cylinder, internal combustion piston engines, designed by Daihatsu, which is a subsidiary of Toyota. The engines range from 843 to 993 cc and have been manufactured in petrol and diesel-driven series. They have cast iron engine blocks and aluminum cylinder heads, and are of either SOHC or DOHC head design, with belt driven camshafts. The engine first appeared in the all-new Daihatsu Charade in October 1977, in "CB20" form.

Most common is the 1-liter CB, which was also available as the diesel CL. There is an 843 cc version called the CD and the extremely rare 926 cc homologation special called the CE.

== CB (993 cc) ==
The 993 cc (1.0 L; 60.6 cu in) CB engine appeared in October 1977, for the then-new Daihatsu Charade. It features 120 degree crank throws and a counter-rotating balance shaft. Bore and stroke are 76.0 mm (2.99 in) and 73.0 mm (2.87 in) respectively. It also incorporated mother concern Toyota's lean-burn design to run cleaner.

It was also fitted to the Daihatsu Hijet, sometimes referred to as the "Daihatsu 1000" when equipped with this engine. It was fitted to the S70/75/76 and S85 models. Italy's Innocenti also used this engine for many variants of their Minitre/990/Small range of cars. De Tomaso was also the first to turbocharge this type of engine, first for a Daihatsu show car and later for the Innocenti Turbo deTomaso.

Versions

		Power			Torque			Norm	Comp.	Fuel system	Cat	Fitment	Notes
		PS	kW	at rpm	Nm	lbft	at rpm	Norm	Comp.	Fuel system	Cat	Fitment	Notes
CB-10	6V SOHC	55	40	5500	77	57	2800	JIS	8.7	single carb	●	1977.10-1980.10 Charade G10	
CB-11	6V SOHC	55	40	5500	76.5	56	2800	JIS	9.1	single carb	●	1980.10-1983.01 Charade G10	
CB-12	6V SOHC	55	40	5500	76.5	56	2800	JIS	9.5	single carb	●	Charade G11	low-powered version
CB-20	6V SOHC	50	37	5500	73	54	3000	DIN	8.7	single carb	–	Charade G10; Mitsubishi Jetstar (Indonesia)	European/export version, 52 PS from 1981
CB-20	6V SOHC	52	38	5600	75	55	3200	DIN	9.0	single carb	–	Charade G10; Mitsubishi Jetstar (Indonesia)	European/export version, 52 PS from 1981
CB-22	6V SOHC	60	44	5600	81	60	3200	JIS	9.5	single carb	●	Charade G11V	commercial emissions standards, also installed in Taiwanese-built Charades
CB-23	6V SOHC	52	38	5600	75	55	3200	DIN	9.5	single carb	–	Charade G100	export
CB-24	6V SOHC	52	38		75	55		DIN	9.5	single carb	●	1993-96 Charade G202	Australia only
CB-31	6V SOHC	60	44	5600	80	59	3200	JIS	9.1	single carb	●	1979.09-1980.10 Charade G10	
CB-32	6V SOHC	60	44	5600	81	60	3200	JIS	9.1	single carb	●	1980.10-1983.01 Charade G10	
CB-33	6V SOHC	60	44	5600	81	60	3200	JIS	9.5	single carb	●	Charade G11	
CB-34	6V SOHC	55	40	5500	76.5	56	2800	JIS	9.5	Electronic carb	●	1983.01-1985.03 Charade G11 "CF"	Fuel efficiency version
CB-35	6V SOHC	55	40	5500	76.5	56	2800	JIS	9.5	Electronic carb	●	1985.03-1987.01 Charade G11 "CX"	EFC-II fuel efficient
CB-36	6V SOHC	50	37	5600	75	55	3200	JIS	9.5	single carb	●	Charade G100	
CB-37	6V SOHC	55	40	5600	78	58	3600	JIS	9.5	single carb	●	Charade G100	
CB-41	6V SOHC	43	32	5200	72.6	54	3200	SAE	8.7/9.0/9.1	single carb	–	1983-86 Hijet S75/S76, 1986–88 Hijet S86, 1993-97 Hijet S85	horizontally mounted, export
CB-41	6V SOHC	45	33	5200	74	55	2400	DIN	8.7/9.0/9.1	single carb	–	1983-86 Hijet S75/S76, 1986–88 Hijet S86, 1993-97 Hijet S85	horizontally mounted, export
CB-42	6V SOHC	47	35					DIN	9.5	EFi	–	1994.06-98 Hijet S86	horizontally mounted, export
CB-50	6V SOHC turbo	80	59	5500	118	87	3500	JIS	8.0	single carb	●	1983.09-1987.01 Charade G11 DeTomaso	
CB-51	6V SOHC turbo	73	54	5600	108	80	3600	JIS	8.0	single carb	●	1987.01-1988.02 Charade G100	
CB-60	6V SOHC turbo	68	50	5500	106	78	3200	DIN	8.0	single carb	–	Charade G11 Turbo, Innocenti Turbo DeTomaso	export version, 72 PS in the Innocenti
CB-61	6V SOHC turbo	68	50	5500	106	78	3200	DIN	8.0	single carb	–	Charade G100 Turbo	export version
CB-70	12V DOHC turbo	105	77	6500	130	96	3500	JIS	7.8	EFi	●	1987.01-1993 Charade GTti/GTxx	Intercooler
CB-80	12V DOHC turbo	101	74	6500	130	96	3500	DIN	7.8	EFi	○	Charade GTti (G100)	export version
CB-90	6V SOHC	54	40	5750	80	59	3000	CEE	9.5	EFi	●	1987-1993 Charade G100	Europe
CB-90	6V SOHC	53	40	5200	78.5	58	3600	SAE	9.5	EFi	●	1989.10-1992 Charade G100	USA, power figures in "hp"

== CD (843 cc) ==
The 843 cc CD engine was usually fitted in export market Daihatsu Hijets (also known as the "Daihatsu 850"). Bore and stroke are 70.0 mm (2.76 in) and 73.0 mm (2.87 in) respectively. Chile (and possibly other markets) also received this engine in the Daihatsu Charade, called the "G20" or "G21" when thus equipped.

== CE (926 cc) ==
The CE engine is turbocharged 926 cc version of 993 cc CB engine, exclusively only for Daihatsu Charade 926 Turbo. The displacement was downsized by reducing the bore size from 76.0 mm to 73.4 mm (73.4 mm x 73.0 mm), this has to be done because of FIA homologation regulation at that time. Daihatsu wanted to take part in the World Rally Championship for cars under 1,300 cc (Group B/9), so with a 1.4 equivalence factor for forced induction engines, this meant that the downsized engine was classified as being of 1296.4 cc.

In 1985, at the Tokyo Motor Show, Daihatsu introduced the 926R, a prototype of a mid engine Charade, developed together with De Tomaso. This race specification CE engine was built in DOHC 12-valve configuration, producing 120 PS (118.4 hp; 88.3 kW) @6500rpm and 147 N⋅m (15.0 kg⋅m; 108.4 lbf⋅ft) @3500rpm. However, because of significant crashes in the 1985 World Rally Championship, Group B was banned and the 926R project was cancelled.

Only 200 units homologation limited Charade 926 Turbo road car were built by Daihatsu, but the CE engine that was fitted in this car was the SOHC 6-valve version based from bored-down CB50 turbo engine and only producing 76 PS (75.0 hp; 55.9 kW) @5500rpm and 108 N⋅m (11.0 kg⋅m; 79.7 lbf⋅ft) @3500rpm.

== CL (993 cc diesel) ==
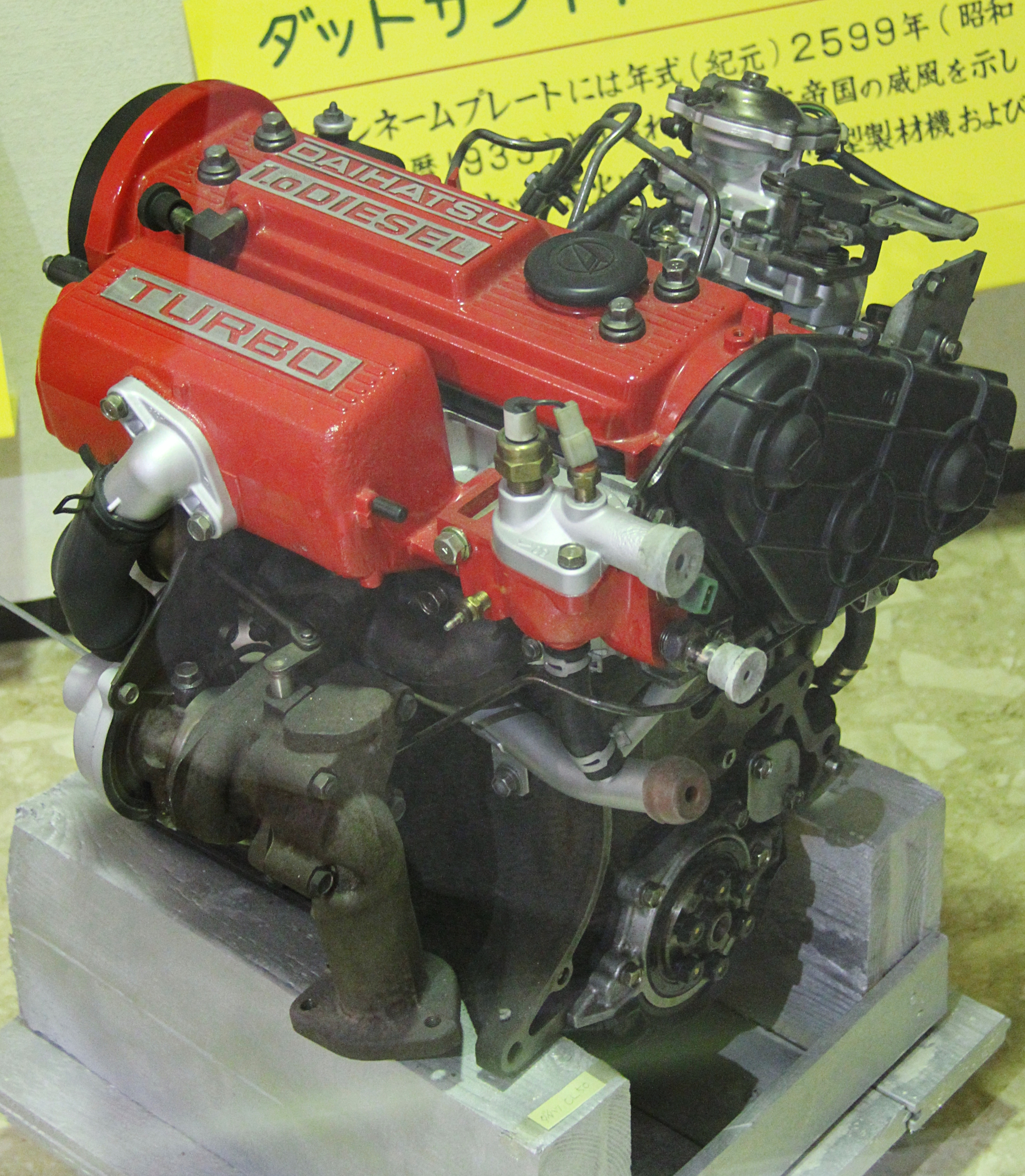
The turbodiesel CL50 engine

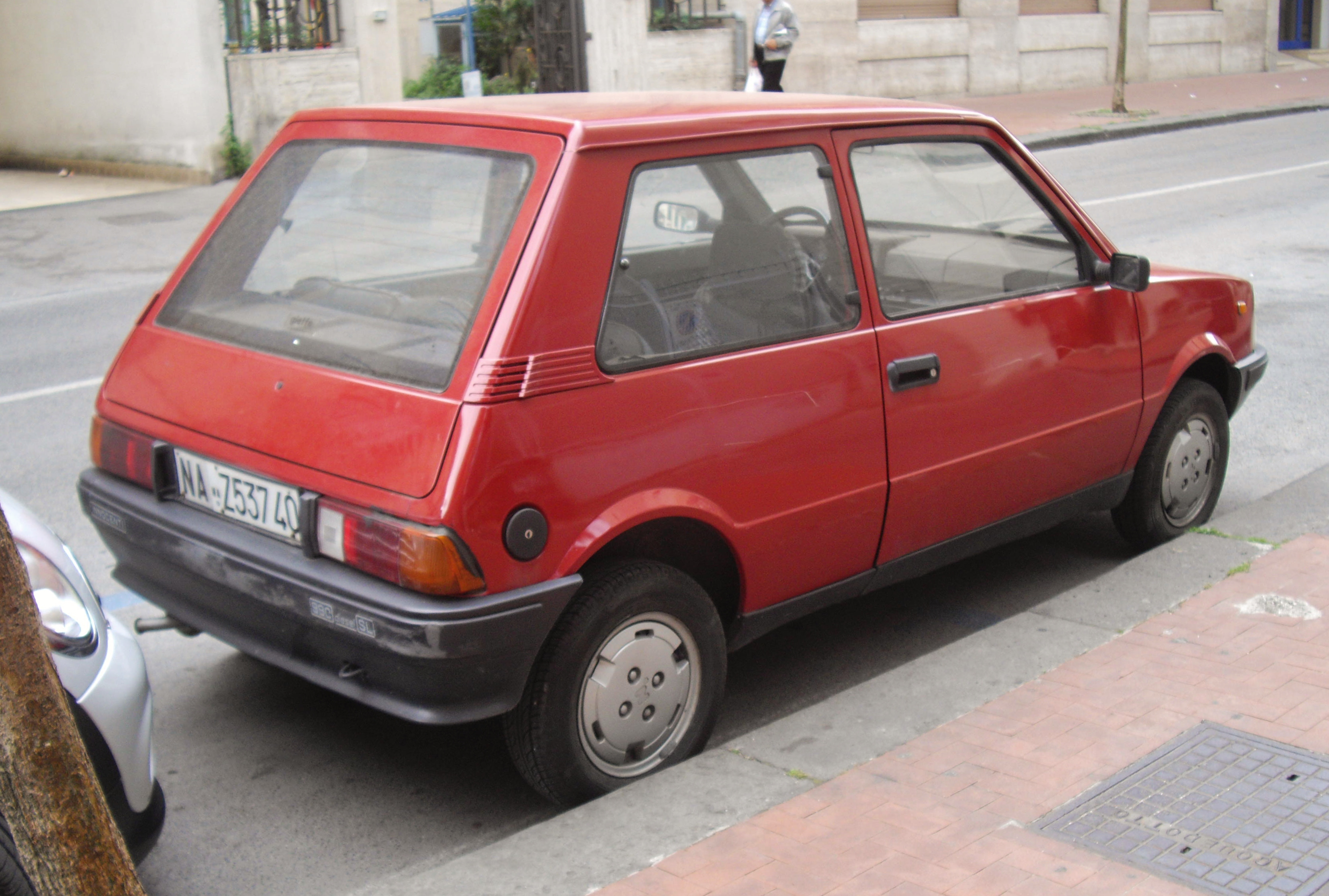
1988-1990 Innocenti 990 diesel SL (rear)

The diesel version of the CB shares that engine's dimensions, for 993 cc (1.0 L; 60.6 cu in). It appeared in 1983, along with the second generation of the Daihatsu Charade. There was also the CL50, a turbocharged version producing 50 PS (37 kW). This engine was also used in the Innocenti 990 diesel.

== See also ==
- List of Toyota engines
