= Innocenti Mini =

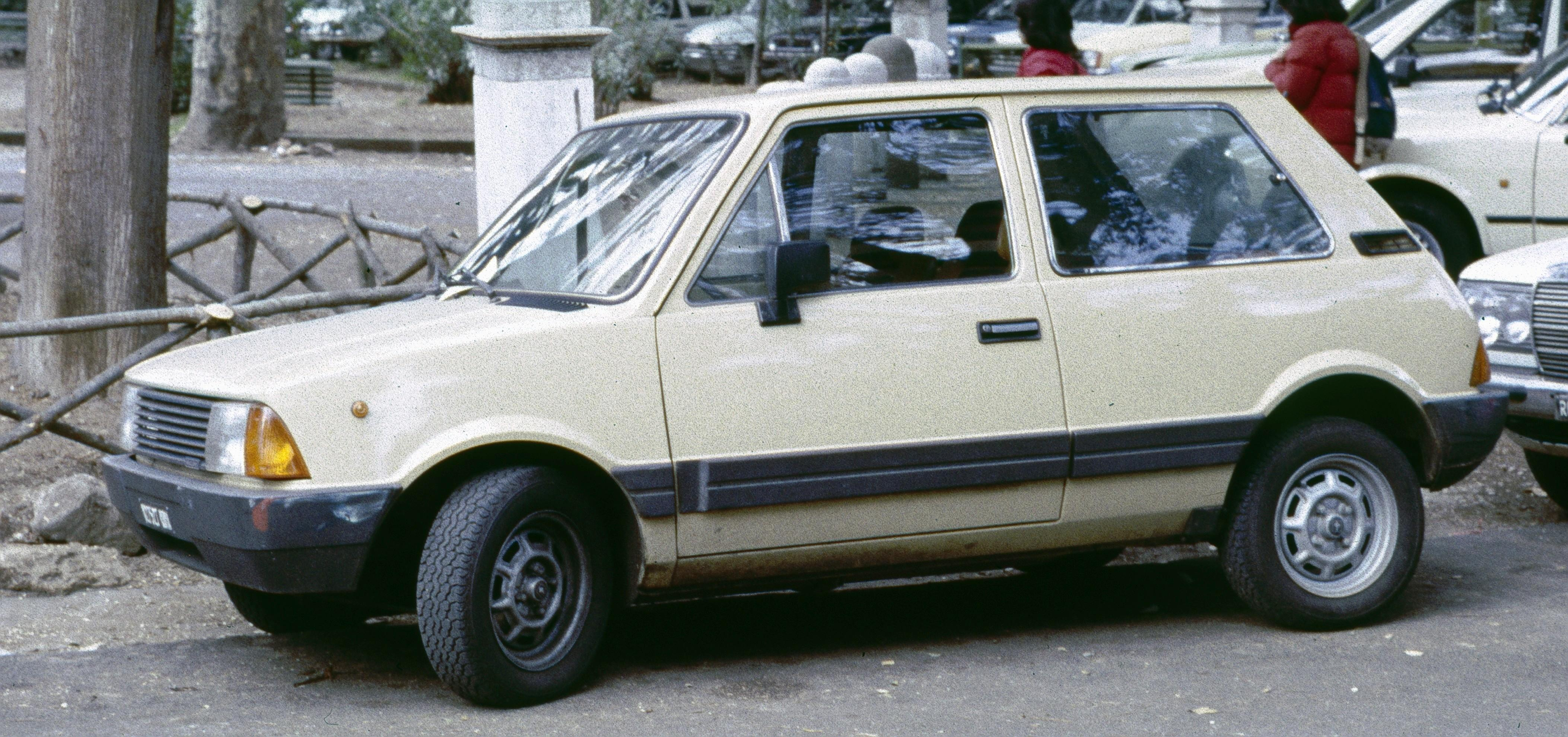
Innocenti 90L Mark II; pre-Daihatsu-face-lift with redesigned headlamps.

The Innocenti Mini is an automobile introduced by Innocenti in 1974. The vehicle was a rebodied, three-door hatchback version of the Mini, styled by Bertone. A five-door prototype was developed around 1980, but was never put into production. After having been sold to De Tomaso in 1976, the Innocenti Mini ended up being powered by Daihatsu-sourced three-cylinder engines and continued in production in incrementally updated forms until 1993.

== Mini assembly from CKD (1965–1975) ==
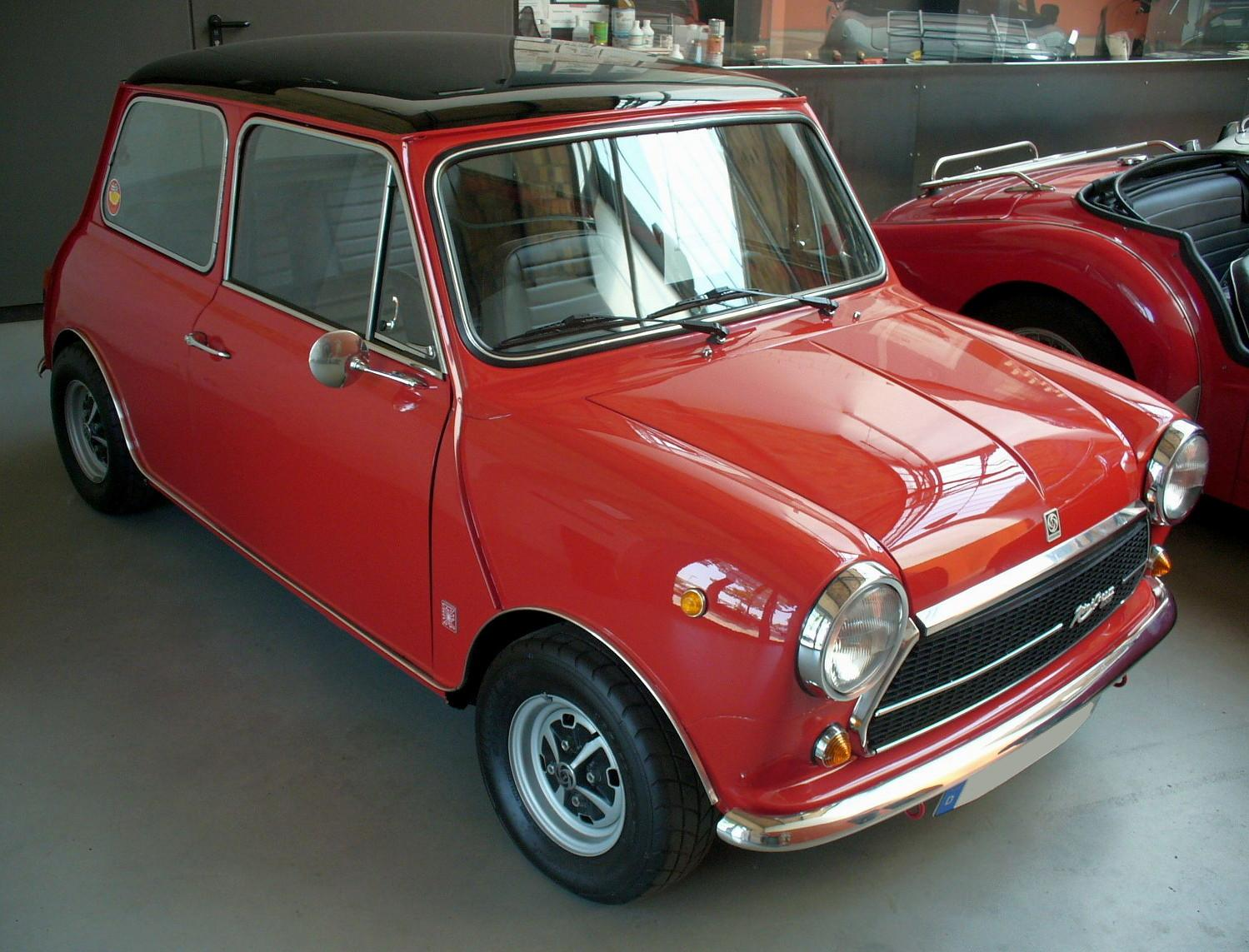
Innocenti Mini (1965–1975)

Prior to developing the Mini 90 / 120 hatchback variants of the Mini, Innocenti undertook assembly of the original Mini design using CKD kits. Introduced in November 1965 as the Innocenti Mini 850, later versions included the 1000, 1001, the Cooper, the Cooper 1300 and the Mini T, the latter being an estate car and the only non-saloon variant produced. Assembly ceased in early 1975. Only the very earliest Minis were built using CKD kits. Most of the production was built using locally sourced shells and componentry. The Innocenti Mini shells differ in many ways from contemporary English built ones.

== British Leyland years ==
Innocenti Mini 90 / 120 Innocenti Mini de Tomaso
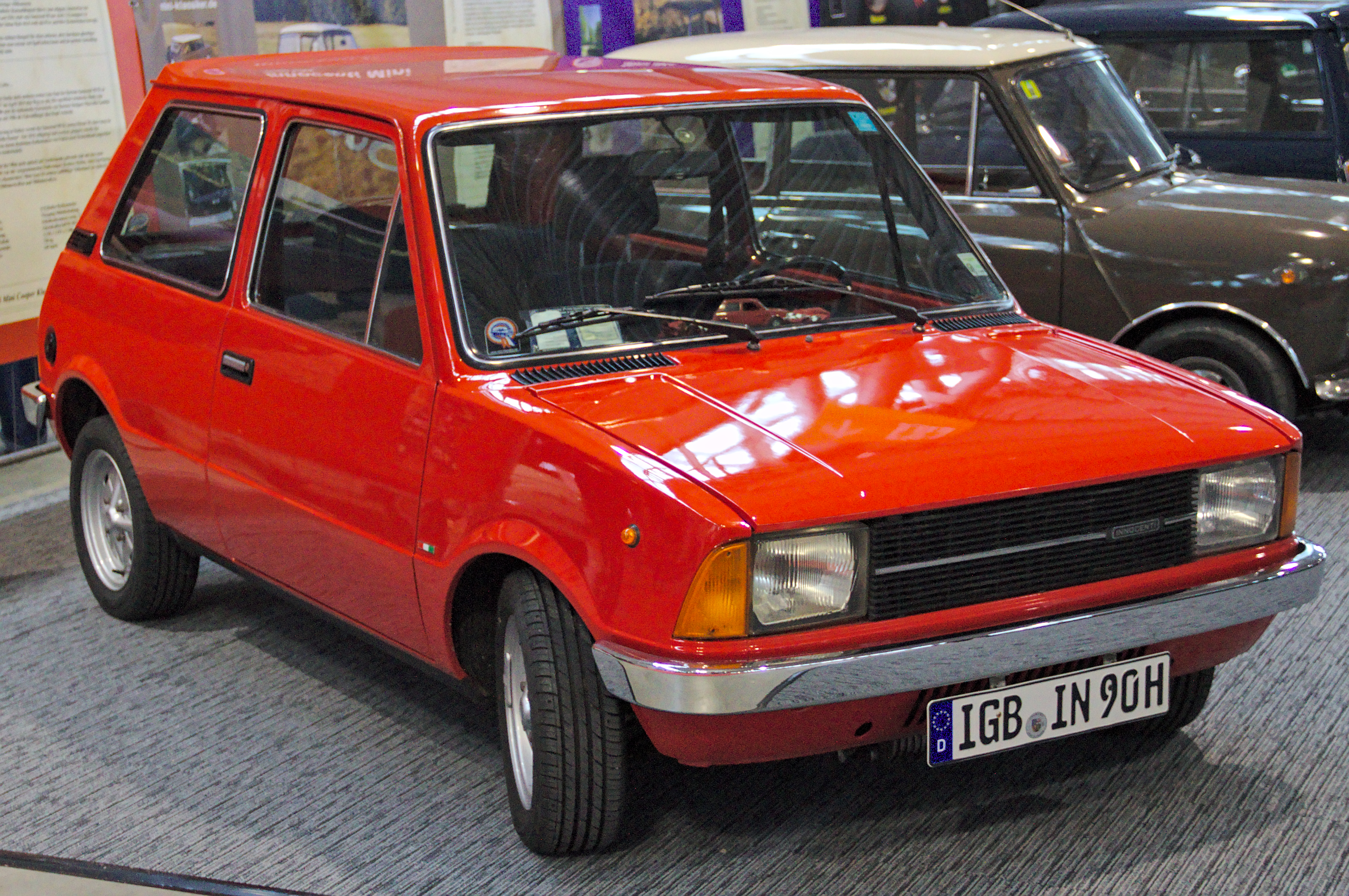

Overview
- Manufacturer: Innocenti
- Production: 1974–1982
- Assembly: Italy: Lambrate, Milan
- Designer: Marcello Gandini at Bertone

Body and chassis
- Class: City car
- Body style: 3-door hatchback
- Layout: FF layout
- Related: Mini

Powertrain
- Engine: 998 cc BMC A-series I4; 1,275 cc BMC A-series I4
- Transmission: 4-speed manual

Dimensions
- Wheelbase: 2,040 mm (80.3 in)
- Length: 3,120–3,170 mm (122.8–124.8 in)
- Width: 1,500 mm (59.1 in)
- Height: 1,365 mm (53.7 in)
- Kerb weight: 730 kg (1,610 lb) (approx)

Chronology
- Predecessor: Innocenti Mini
- Successor: Innocenti Koral

Innocenti, under the ownership of the British Leyland Motor Corporation (BLMC) developed rebodied versions of the Mini, known as the Innocenti Mini 90L and 120L, which were released at the Turin Show in 1974. The new, Bertone-styled Mini was originally launched in two versions, the 90L and 120L – the former having the 998 cc A-series engine putting out 43 bhp (32 kW; 44 PS), and the latter the 1275 cc unit, with an extra 20 bhp (15 kW) on tap. These outputs were later uprated to 49 bhp (37 kW; 50 PS) and 65 bhp (48 kW; 66 PS) respectively. As for the English-built Mini, the Innocenti received the "dry" rubber cone suspension, which provided excellent handling but at the cost of a very bumpy ride. All Leyland-engined Innocentis received a four-speed manual transmission.

At one point there were even plans for the Bertone-designed Mini to replace the original English Mini, but these came to nothing. Within a year of the car's launch, BLMC went bankrupt and in May 1976 Innocenti was sold to De Tomaso and GEPI. BL retained a 5% stake. The new owners renamed the company Nuova Innocenti ("New Innocenti") and continued to build the car without any real change.

Innocenti's Mini version was generally nicely equipped and had a better finish than their English brethren, leading to higher sales and a better reputation in many continental European markets (aside from Italy), such as France. The largest improvement was the addition of a rear hatch, allowing for improved access to the (still tiny) luggage compartment. The drag resistance was also marginally lower than that of the original Mini, 0.41 Cd rather than 0.42.

=== De Tomaso ===
Innocenti De Tomaso

At the 1976 Turin Auto Show the sporting Innocenti Mini de Tomaso was first shown. It entered series production in early 1977 and featured moulded plastic bumpers rather than the filigrane, chromed units used for the 90/120. There were also integral foglights, a bonnet scoop, and wheelarch extensions to accommodate the alloy wheels which completed the sporting appearance. Power at introduction was 71 bhp (53 kW; 72 PS), but this crept up to 74 bhp (55 kW; 75 PS) in 1978.

=== Mille ===
In 1980, the facelifted and better equipped Mini Mille made its appearance. The Mille (1000) replaced the larger-engined 120 in most markets, and featured moulded plastic bumpers, headlights which sloped backwards, and redesigned taillights. Overall length increased by a couple of inches (5 cm). There was also a "90 LS II" version introduced for 1981, and the "90 SL" for the 1982 model year. By 1982, however, Alessandro de Tomaso's deal with BL had ended. For various reasons, politico-industrial as well as due to British Leyland's reluctance to provide engines to what was a competitor in many continental markets, the decision to thoroughly reengineer the Innocenti Mini was reached. After a lot of testing, the car was finally adapted to take a three-cylinder Daihatsu engine and various other mechanical parts. Because of Daihatsu's minuscule European presence, selling engines to Innocenti would have a minimal negative impact on their own sales, instead offering a door to many European markets that they had yet to reach. Thanks to Alfa Romeo's Arna deal with Nissan a few years earlier, the Italian political resistance against Japanese companies had been lessened and DeTomaso encountered no political difficulties.

== Daihatsu and Fiat era ==
Innocenti Minitre/990/650; Innocenti Turbo de Tomaso
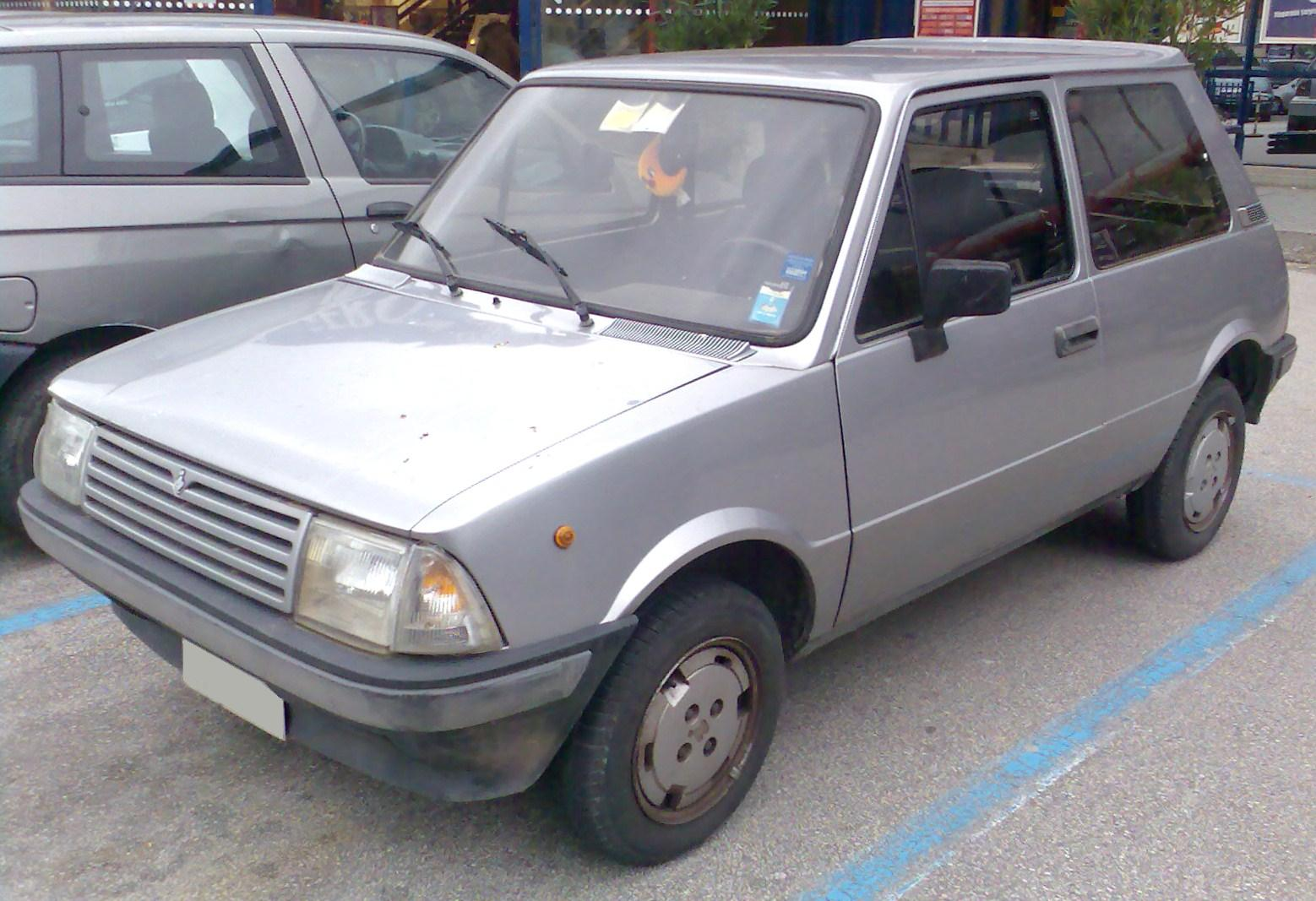
- 1990–1993 Innocenti Small 500

Overview
- Manufacturer: Innocenti
- Production: 1982–1993
- Assembly: Italy: Milan
- Designer: Bertone

Body and chassis
- Class: City car
- Body style: 3-door hatchback
- Layout: FF layout
- Related: Daihatsu Charade

Powertrain
- Engine: 548 cc Daihatsu EB I3; 617 cc Daihatsu AD I2; 659 cc Daihatsu EF I3; 993 cc Daihatsu CB22 I3; 993 cc Daihatsu CB-DT/CB60/61 turbo I3; 993 cc Daihatsu CL10 diesel I3
- Transmission: 5-speed manual; 2-speed semi-automatic

Dimensions
- Wheelbase: 2,045–2,205 mm (80.5–86.8 in)
- Length: 3,135–3,375 mm (123.4–132.9 in)
- Width: 1,515–1,530 mm (59.6–60.2 in)
- Height: 1,340–1,380 mm (52.8–54.3 in)
- Kerb weight: 638–740 kg (1,407–1,631 lb)

Chronology
- Predecessor: Innocenti Mini

=== Minitre ===
In April 1982, at the same time as the engines were changed for Daihatsu units, the Mini's original rubber suspension was changed to a more conventional (and comfortable) independently developed layout with MacPherson struts in the front and an independent, rear suspension with lower wishbones and a transverse single-leaf spring which also acted as a stabilizer. To indicate the new engines, the cars were renamed Innocenti Tre Cilindri, or simply "Tre" (three). The new engines and suspension carried with them a weight penalty of about 55 kg (121 lb). The new Innocentis were nearly indistinguishable from their predecessors, the external changes being limited to badging and a chin spoiler. In January 1984, along with a gentle facelift, they were renamed Minitre (sometimes written "Mini 3"). Most of the new parts came straight from the Daihatsu Charade. European exports, which had hitherto been managed by local British Leyland affiliates, were either halted or generally slowed down. For the first year or two, Minitres were limited to exporting to France, Belgium, and Switzerland. In 1983, the German Daihatsu importer Walter Hagen took over sales there, after a hiatus of over a year. The old Leyland-engined versions continued to be sold until stocks ran out. In spite of the new model, production dropped steadily: from 23,187 in 1981 to 21,646 the next year to 13,688 in 1983, the first year in which all cars were Daihatsu-engined. During 1984, sales shot up again as the car had regained its credibility. Carrozzeria Embo displayed a convertible version of the Minitre SE, called a Spyder, but de Tomaso decided against series production.

Aside from the sporting turbocharged version, the Minitre was originally only available with a carburetted 52 PS (38 kW) petrol engine, in three different levels of trim: S, SL, and SE. While usually fitted with a five-speed manual transmission rather than the four-speed unit used in the earlier four-cylinder cars, a two-speed semiautomatic also became available in July 1984, sold as the "Minimatic". This was the same unit as the one marketed as the "Daimatic" by Daihatsu themselves. The Matic's gearbox has the same dimensions as does the manual transmission, and is fitted with a torque converter and a planetary gear train with two gear ratios which are selected by a traditional, floor-mounted gear lever.

While the Daihatsu powertrains were considerably more expensive than the English units, Alejandro DeTomaso stated that this was more than paid for by lowered warranty claims. In 1984 he said that warranty repairs were down by 70% when Japanese-engined Minis were compared with the BL-engined ones. His biggest problem was that his service network had become overstaffed as a result of the higher quality engines. This surfeit of servicing staff may have also been a result of steadily declining production numbers (down from the forty-thousands in the late seventies to the mid-teens by 1984/1985), something which De Tomaso tried to ameliorate by offering a more luxurious and customisable product than did their main competitor Fiat.

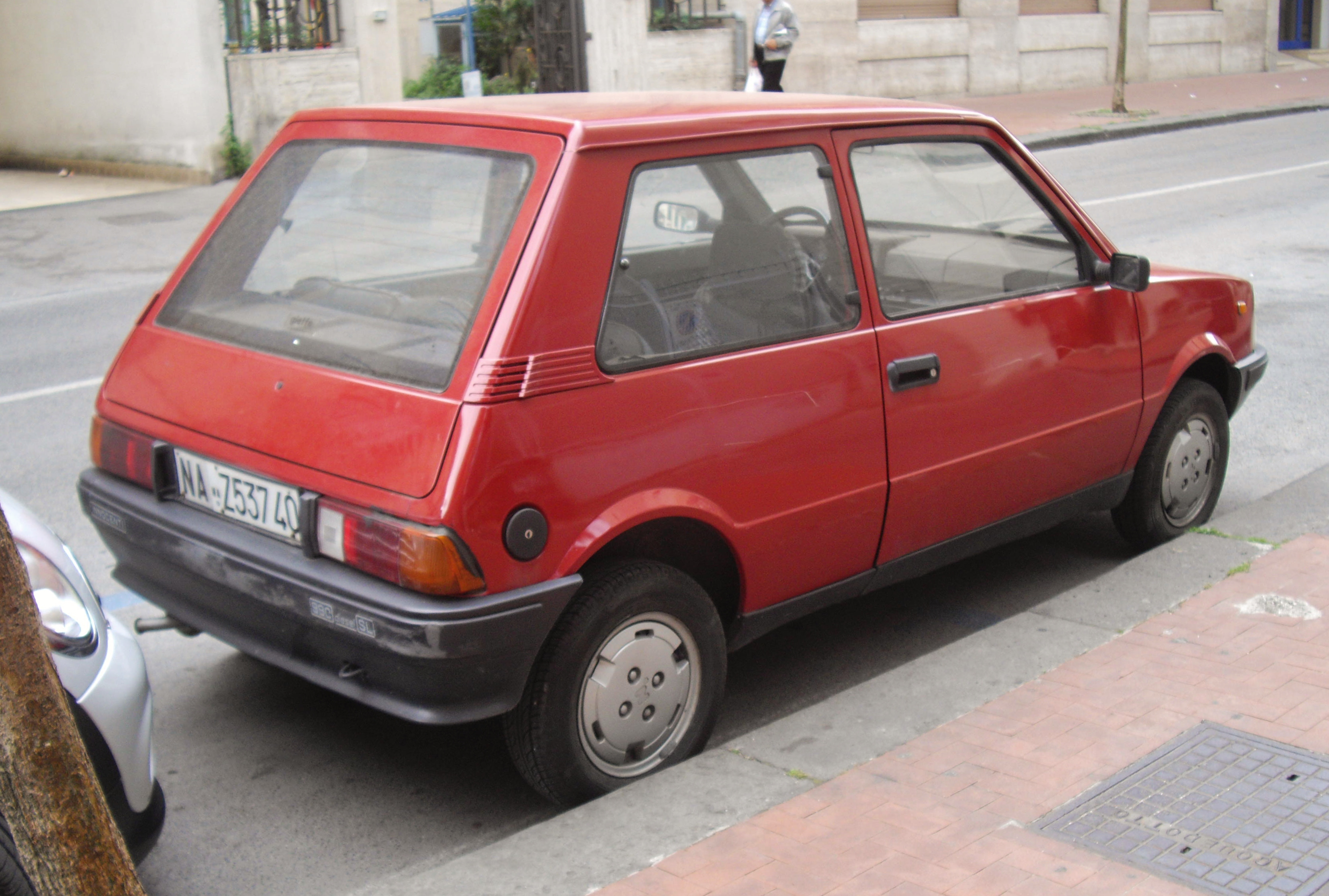
1988–1990 Innocenti 990 diesel SL (rear)

The three-cylinder (and some two-cylinder versions as well) continued in production until 1993, and this range was also available with a 37 PS (27 kW) diesel version of the 1-litre engine. The diesel looked the same, inside and out, as did the regular Minitre. At the time of introduction (April 1984), this engine was not only the smallest passenger car diesel in the world, but also had the highest specific output of any naturally aspirated diesel engine in series production; it thus made for a surprisingly spirited performer. Introduced as part of an effort to bring Innocenti production above the threshold of profitability, around 20,000 cars annually, the Minidiesel sold very well. The diesel took thirty percent of the overall production with nearly no negative effect on sales of the petrol versions, a considerably bigger share than the expected twenty percent. It was helped by a lack of real competitors: by 1988 it still only had to compete with the 1.3 litre Fiat Uno and Panda diesels, as well as the Volkswagen Polo diesel, all of which were in a higher tax bracket and had higher fuel consumption.

==== 990 ====
In Turin 1986, the longer 990 was presented. This version had a wheelbase which was extended by 160 mm (6.3 in) and was available with either the naturally aspirated petrol or diesel 1 L engines. In addition to a more useful back seat, the 990 also had a more sloped windscreen for somewhat better aerodynamics. Classified as a five-seater, even two adults would still find the rear seat uncomfortable. A well balanced design, the longer wheelbase version can be hard to identify, if not for the missing pillar in the glass of the door, and the forward placement of the mirrors. The luggage space also increased somewhat, with 295 L (10.4 cu ft) rather than 280 L (9.9 cu ft).

The 990 also received bigger bumpers and a new grille with horizontal bars and the Innocenti logo, a stylised "i". The rear number plate was moved up to between the rear lights. The 990's rear seat folded and was divided down the middle.

The 990 was an adaptation of a 1982 concept executed by carrozzeria Embo, using the longer chassis of the Mini Traveller. The Embo showcar was less elegant than the finished "990", the bodywork being extended by simply adding an insert behind the B-pillar. Unlike the 990, it also had a slightly raised rear roof and a small luggage rack on the front portion thereof, á la the Matra Rancho. Excepting the turbo, the shorter 1-litre versions were taken out of production in July 1987. The 990 was available as the SL, and as a better-equipped SE version.

There was also a "Minitre Commerciale", continuing the rôle of the earlier Mini 90 Commerciale two-seater van. When the longer 990 arrived there was also a 990 C (for "Commerciale") and also a 990 diesel C. In France, the earlier short wheelbase diesel van was briefly available as the "Minidiesel Société". As for the range overall, the Commerciale was somewhat hampered by its small aperture for the luggage area - especially when compared to more modern competitors.

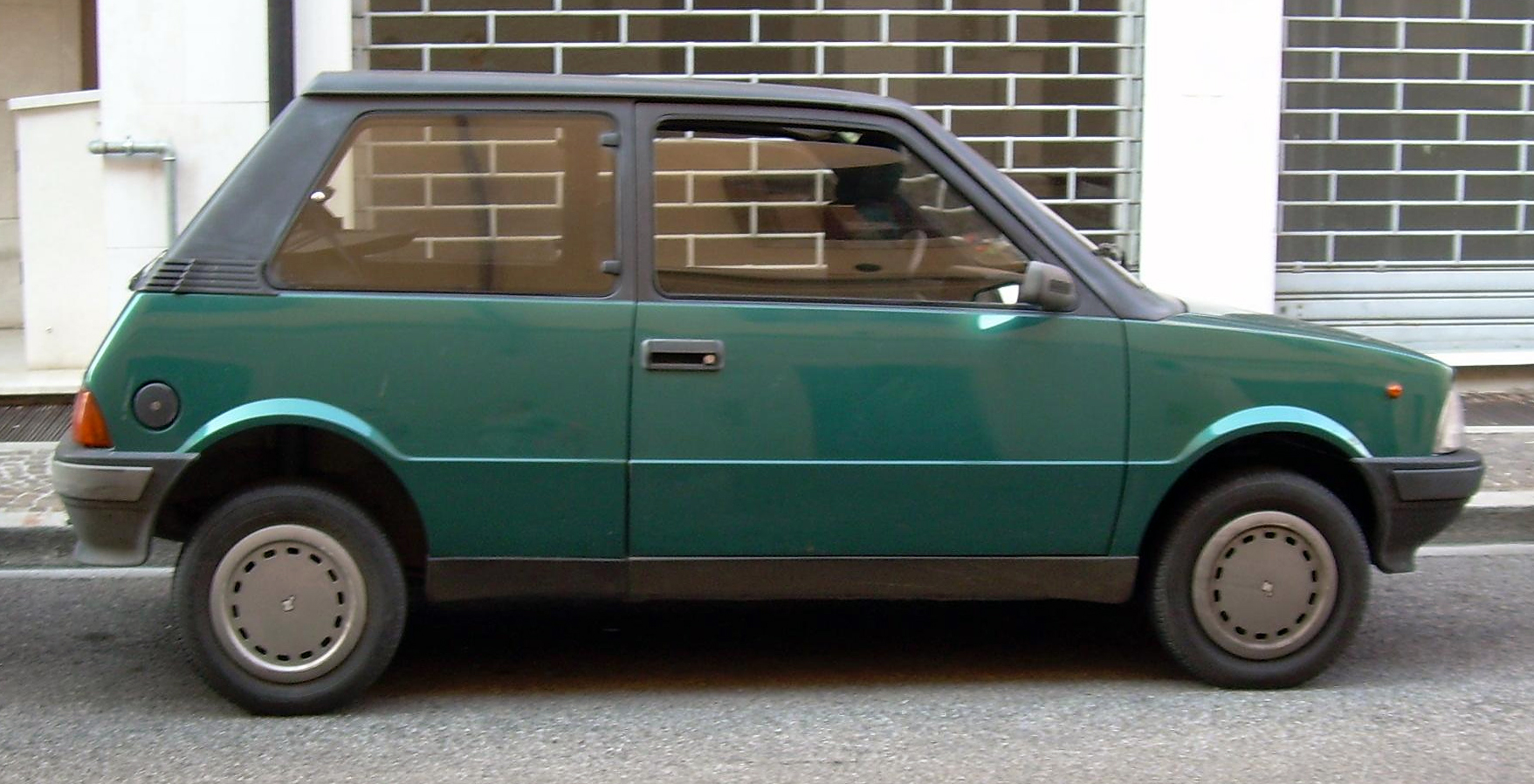
Late production, long-wheelbase "Small 990 Serie Speciale"

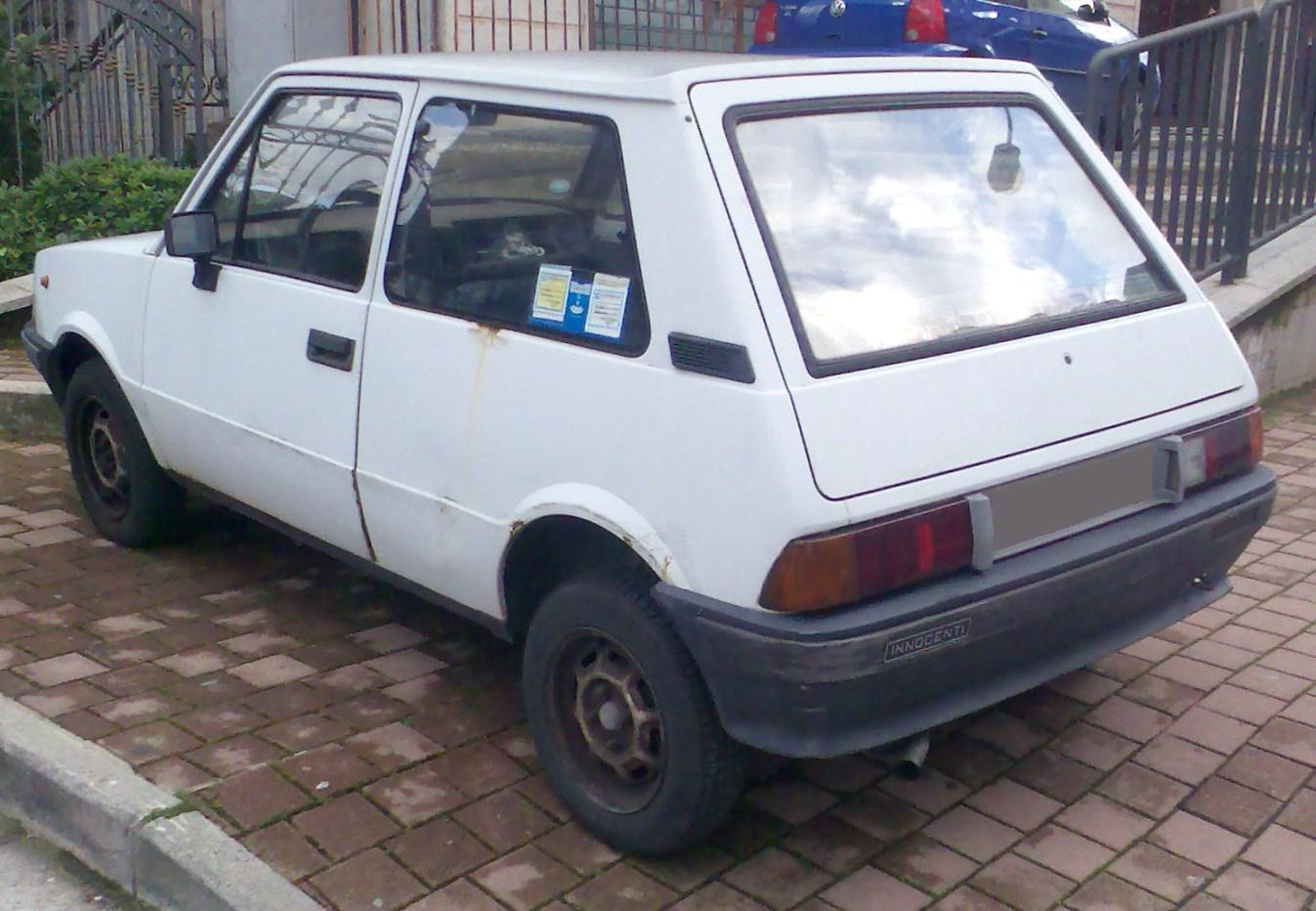
Rear view of Innocenti Small 500

=== 650/500 ===
A "Minidue" had been rumoured for some time, but most were expecting the fitment of a Moto Guzzi 650 cc V-twin engine, since Moto Guzzi was another company owned by de Tomaso at the time. A few prototypes were even built with this engine, but the amount of work it would have taken to make the motorcycle unit suitable for a car made the project unfeasible. Instead, Innocenti chose to stick to Daihatsu engines. First shown at the Turin Auto Show in November 1984, the two-cylinder, short-stroke 617 cc "Mini 650" was also available as a better equipped "SE" model. The 650 received a silver-painted asymmetric grille, while the SE model had model-specific hubcaps divided into threes. While not very powerful at 31 PS (23 kW), the two-cylinder engine was surprisingly smooth-running thanks to the use of twin balance shafts. The dashboard was also unique to the 650 and was quite spartan: for instance, it had no door to the glove compartment. In the rear, the reflective bar between the taillights was replaced by a black plastic unit.

The "650" was succeeded by the three-cylinder 550 cc (660 cc from late 1990) "Mini 500", which went on sale in January 1988. These engines all came from the Daihatsu Cuore rather than the bigger Charade. The 550 cc Innocenti 500 (with L or more luxurious LS equipment) was first shown in November 1987 and replaced the preceding "650" since engine-supplier Daihatsu had ended production of the outdated two-cylinder engine. The carburetted 500 offered 31 PS (23 kW) at 6400 rpm for a 116 km/h (72 mph) top speed. In late 1988, about 75 percent of Innocentis sold in the home market were 500s. Outside Italy, this car also found some popularity in France, where its 3CV tax rating was as low as that of the considerably less habitable Fiat 126.

From the outside, the 500 could be identified by some visual alterations as recently used on the 990: a horizontally divided grille with a prominent "i" logo larger bumpers which incorporated the lower air intake up front. The rear number plate moved up, to between the taillights. The interior was also updated, with round gauges and new upholstery. The LS also gained an asymmetrically divided folding rear seat.

=== Small ===
Following Fiat's 1990 takeover of Innocenti, the car was renamed the Innocenti Small and the Diesel, Matic, and Turbo de Tomaso versions were dropped. Updates included a slight facelift in November 1990, while the little 500's engine was updated to a 659 cc version following changes to the kei car regulations in March 1990 to allow for 660 cc of displacement—Daihatsu had quickly replaced the smaller EB engine with the somewhat bigger EF unit. Power remained exactly the same, while an increase in torque from 42 N⋅m (31 lb⋅ft) at 4,000 rpm to 49 N⋅m (36 lb⋅ft) at 3,400 rpm increased flexibility and meant that the top speed crept up to 120 km/h (75 mph). Fuel economy also increased moderately. (Note: From 5.5 L/100 km at a constant speed of 90 km/h and 6.6 L/100 km in the urban cycle to 5.3 and 6.5 L/100 km respectively for the larger engined version.) In July 1991 a luxurious "Serie Speciale" variant of the 990 was introduced, also offered with an available canvas-roof. The 990 Serie Speciale featured an alcantara interior by Missoni.

In 1992, catalysed versions of both Innocenti Small versions entered the market. These versions had marginally lower power (see table) and top speeds. The last development was the "Small 500 SE" of 1993, which offered the smaller engine mounted in the longer "990"-style body. Production ended on March 31, 1993, with sales continuing into the next year. Daihatsu did stop using the three-cylinder CB engine in their own cars a few months before, but this may be coincidental.

=== Turbo de Tomaso ===
After the change to Daihatsu engines, a new De Tomaso version with a turbocharged, 72 PS (53 kW) version of the 993 cc three-cylinder engine was presented in December 1983. Italian sales began the next month. This was the two-valve version; the considerably more powerful multivalve version used in the Charade GTti was never used in the Innocenti. The bodywork was also revised, with the headlights now sloping backwards and with new bumpers, skirts, and bumper extensions to fit the 160/65 SR315 (TRX) alloys. The sporty steering wheel received a leather rim. The original version was equipped with an Italian development of the naturally aspirated CB22 engine (called CB-DT, for "De Tomaso"), with an IHI RHB5 turbocharger and the same 9.1:1 compression ratio as for the CB22. Max power was reached at 6200 rpm for the original version. In road tests the Innocenti came in for complaints for its awkward upright driving position, mediocre comfort, and instability under braking. Plus points were steering, light weight, and appearance. The CB-DT engine was noted for its smoothness and lack of "brio".

In the second half of 1984 the Italian CB-DT engine was replaced with the fully Daihatsu-built CB60 engine. The CB60, with a smaller IHI RHB32 charger and a more suitable 8:1 compression ratio (with a 0.5 bar charge, rather than the 0.37 bar used in the CB-DT), reached max power at 5700 rpm. Tractability at lower engine speeds also improved since the smaller charger was more willing to spool up; this had been an area of concern with the earlier engine which had little power beneath 3500 rpm.

In July 1988 the engine was upgraded to CB61 specifications; this version received grey rather than red casings in the engine compartment. For the Canadian (and Swiss) markets, a catalysed version of the carburetted CB60 engine was installed. This unit was slightly less powerful, with 68 PS (50 kW) at 5500 rpm. After Fiat's purchase of Innocenti in 1990, the Turbo de Tomaso, along with the diesel and the "Matic" versions, were all dropped.

=== Exports ===
European exports had been run by the British Leyland affiliates in target markets, and were either halted or generally slowed down once the Daihatsu-engined cars were introduced. In 1982 and most of 1983 Minitres were only exported to France, Belgium, and to Switzerland. In 1983 Innocenti re-entered the German market, signalling a slow climb in exports once again.

The Innocenti DeTomaso was brought to Canada by a company called Incacars (Dino Rivera, Montreal) from 1984 but sales dropped considerably with concerns about reliability – from 2,000 cars the first year to only 196 in the first six months of 1986. Apart from catalysed versions of the CB22 or CB60 (DeTomaso) engines, the Canada-bound DeTomasos also received unique rectangular side-marker lights.

== Data ==
Daihatsu-engined Innocenti Mini series (numbers in italics are test results, not factory numbers)
Small-engined versions	engine		disp (cc)	fuel feed	power			torque			top speed		0–100 (km/h)	wheelbase	length	width	height	orig. weight		trans- mission	production
Small-engined versions	engine		disp (cc)	fuel feed	PS	kW	@ rpm	Nm	lbft	@ rpm	km/h	mph	0–100 (km/h)	mm (in)				kg	lb	trans- mission	production
Mini 650, SE	"AD"	SOHC I2	617	single carburettor	31	23	5,700	45	33	3,500	118	73	29.8	2,045 (80.5)	3,160 (124.4)	1,520 (59.8)	1,375 (54.1)	665	1,466	5MT	1984–1987
500 L/LS Small 500 L/LS	"EB"	SOHC I3	548	single carburettor	31	23	6,400	42	31	4,000	116	72		2,045 (80.5)	3,212 (126.5)	1,520 (59.8)	1,380 (54.3)	650	1,433	5MT	1987–1990
500 L/LS Small 500 L/LS	"EF"	SOHC I3	659	single carburettor	31	23	6,400	49	36	3,400	120	75	27.4	2,045 (80.5)	3,212 (126.5)	1,520 (59.8)	1,380 (54.3)	660	1,455	5MT	1990–1993
Small 500 L/LS (Cat.)	"EF"	SOHC I3	659	fuel injection	30	22	6,600	46	34	3,200	118	73		2,045 (80.5)	3,212 (126.5)	1,520 (59.8)	1,380 (54.3)	660	1,455	5MT	1992–1993
Small 500 SE (Cat.)	"EF"	SOHC I3	659	fuel injection	30	22	6,600	46	34	3,200				2,206 (86.9)	3,375 (132.9)	1,520 (59.8)	1,375 (54.1)			5MT	1993
1-litre versions
3 Cilindri/Minitre, SE, SE Special	"CB22"	SOHC I3	993	twin-barrel carburettor	52	38	5,600	74	55	3,200	145	90	17.4	2,045 (80.5)	3,160 (124.4)	1,520 (59.8)	1,380 (54.3)	638	1,407	5MT	1982–1986
3 Cilindri/Minitre, SE, SE Special	"CB22"	SOHC I3	993	twin-barrel carburettor	52	38	5,800	71	52	3,600	145	90	17.4	2,045 (80.5)	3,160 (124.4)	1,520 (59.8)	1,380 (54.3)	675	1,488	5MT	1986–1987
Minimatic, SE	"CB22"	SOHC I3	993	twin-barrel carburettor	52	38	5,600	74	55	3,200	140	87		2,045 (80.5)	3,160 (124.4)	1,520 (59.8)	1,380 (54.3)	690	1,521	2AT	1984–1986
990 SE/SL (Small) 990 SE/SL	"CB23"	SOHC I3	993	twin-barrel carburettor	52	38	5,600	78	58	3,200	145	90	16.2	2,206 (86.9)	3,375 (132.9)	1,520 (59.8)	1,375 (54.1)	695	1,532	5MT	1986–1988
990 SE/SL (Small) 990 SE/SL	"CB23"	SOHC I3	993	twin-barrel carburettor	53	39	5,750	78	58	3,500	147	91	16.2	2,206 (86.9)	3,375 (132.9)	1,520 (59.8)	1,375 (54.1)	715	1,576	5MT	1988–1993
Small 990 SE (Cat.)	"CB23"	SOHC I3	993	Fuel injection	50	37	5,800	74	55	3,300	147	91	16.6	2,206 (86.9)	3,375 (132.9)	1,520 (59.8)	1,375 (54.1)	715	1,576	5MT	1992–1993
990 Matic	"CB23"	SOHC I3	993	twin-barrel carburettor	52	38	5,800	71	52	3,600	140	87	24.4	2,206 (86.9)	3,375 (132.9)	1,520 (59.8)	1,375 (54.1)	715	1,576	2AT	1986–1988
990 Matic	"CB23"	SOHC I3	993	twin-barrel carburettor	53	39	5,750	78	58	3,500	140	87		2,206 (86.9)	3,375 (132.9)	1,520 (59.8)	1,375 (54.1)	715	1,576	2AT	1988–1990
Turbo De Tomaso
Turbo De Tomaso	"CB-DT"	SOHC I3	993	turbocharger, twin carburettor	72	53	6,200	95	70	4,400	165	103	10.8	2,045 (80.5)	3,135 (123.4)	1,530 (60.2)	1,380 (54.3)	670	1,477	5MT	1983–1984
Turbo De Tomaso	"CB60"	SOHC I3	993	turbocharger, twin carburettor	72	53	5,700	104	77	3,500	162	101	10.8	2,045 (80.5)	3,135 (123.4)	1,530 (60.2)	1,380 (54.3)	710	1,565	5MT	1984–1988
Turbo De Tomaso	"CB61"	SOHC I3	993	turbocharger, twin carburettor	72	53	5,800	108	80	3,400	158	98		2,045 (80.5)	3,135 (123.4)	1,530 (60.2)	1,380 (54.3)	710	1,565	5MT	1988–1990
Turbo De Tomaso (Cat.)	"CB60"	SOHC I3	993	turbocharger, twin carburettor	68	50	5,500	106	78	3,200	158	98		2,045 (80.5)	3,135 (123.4)	1,530 (60.2)	1,380 (54.3)			5MT	1984–1987
Diesels
Minidiesel, SE	"CL10"	SOHC I3	993	diesel	37	27	4,600	60	44	3,450	125	78	24.8	2,045 (80.5)	3,160 (123.4)	1,520 (59.8)	1,380 (54.3)	710	1,565	5MT	1984–1985
Minidiesel, SE	"CL10"	SOHC I3	993	diesel	37	27	4,600	61	45	3,000	125	78		2,045 (80.5)	3,160 (123.4)	1,520 (59.8)	1,380 (54.3)	685	1,510	5MT	1985–1987
990 Diesel SE, SL	"CL10"	SOHC I3	993	diesel	37	27	4,600	61	45	3,000	124	77	24.1	2,206 (86.9)	3,375 (132.9)	1,520 (59.8)	1,375 (54.1)	740	1,631	5MT	1986–1988
990 Diesel SE, SL	"CL11"	SOHC I3	993	diesel	37	27	4,800	60	44	3,200	124	77		2,206 (86.9)	3,375 (132.9)	1,520 (59.8)	1,375 (54.1)	740	1,631	5MT	1988–1990
