= Michelin TRX =

Radial car tire introduced in 1975

The Michelin TRX, (and the related TDX), is a radial tire introduced by the Michelin Group in 1975. It is one of the first volume-produced low-profile tires. Although technologically advanced, and reasonably successful, the tire's requirement for a non-standard rim ultimately condemned it to a relatively short commercial life. It has thus been called the "Betamax of the tire industry."

== Background and development ==
As passenger car performance increased during the 1970s, the need arose for improved tire capability. One of the possibilities was to reduce sidewall height, low sidewalls being common at the time on crossply racing tires, but not usual for the better-performing radial tire. The problem was that reducing sidewall height compromised tire comfort, in part due to the roadwheel rim profile used.

Michelin therefore decided to introduce the world's first tire and roadwheel system, where the two were designed together. This would enable both lower sidewall height, (for better roadholding) whilst retaining comfort due to better stress distribution within the tire, enabled by the redesigned wheel rim and tire bead.

The "TR" was for "tension répartie", since tire stresses were better balanced in the new design, whilst the "X" was a reference to previous Michelin products such as the famous "X" radial.

TRX tires thus require the use of wheels that were specially designed for them; standard tires do not fit TRX wheels and vice versa.

To avoid potentially dangerous confusion, Michelin used metric sizes for TRX roadwheels instead of the standard imperial wheel size (normally stated in inches).

== Usage ==
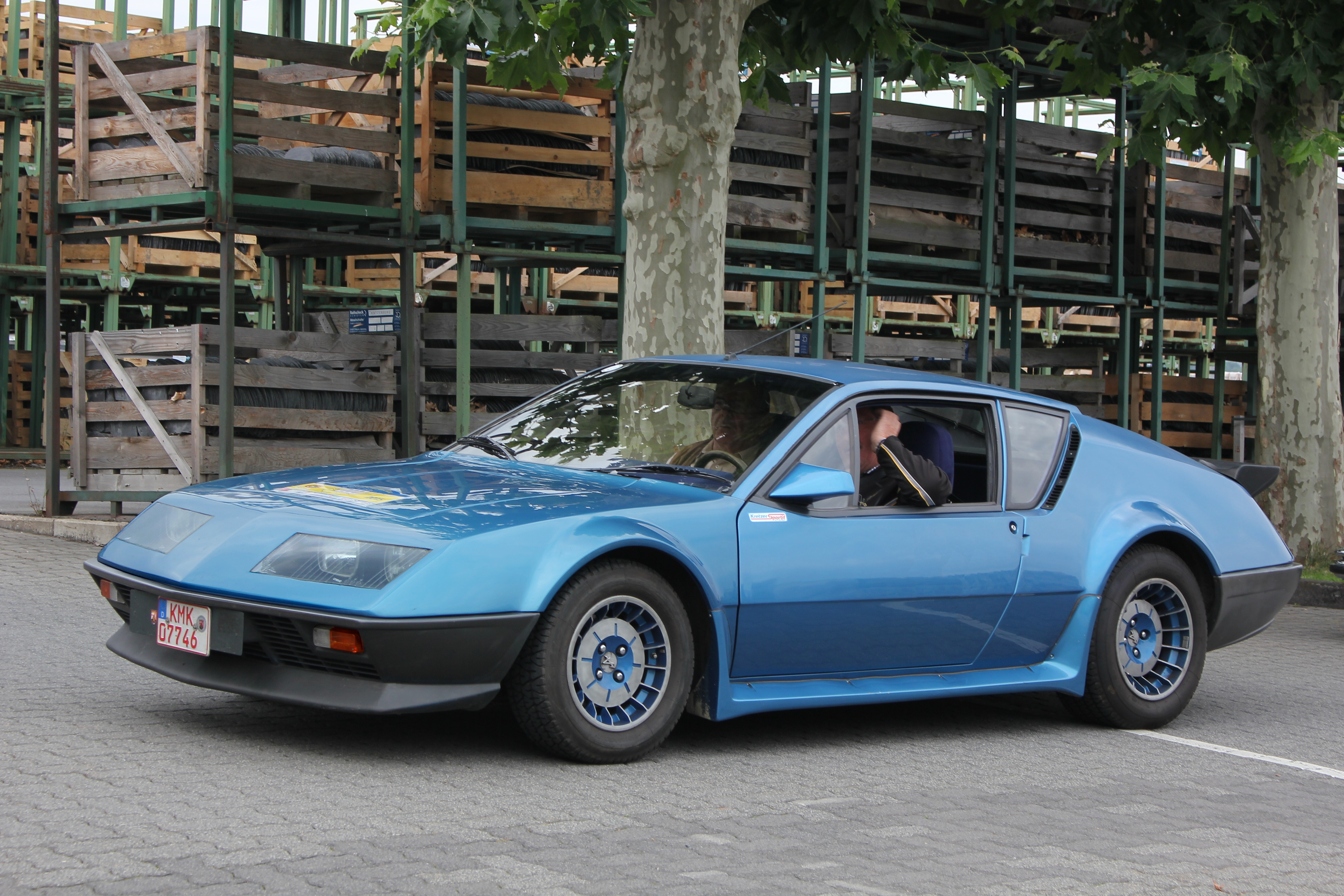
Renault Alpine A310 V6 with TRX tires

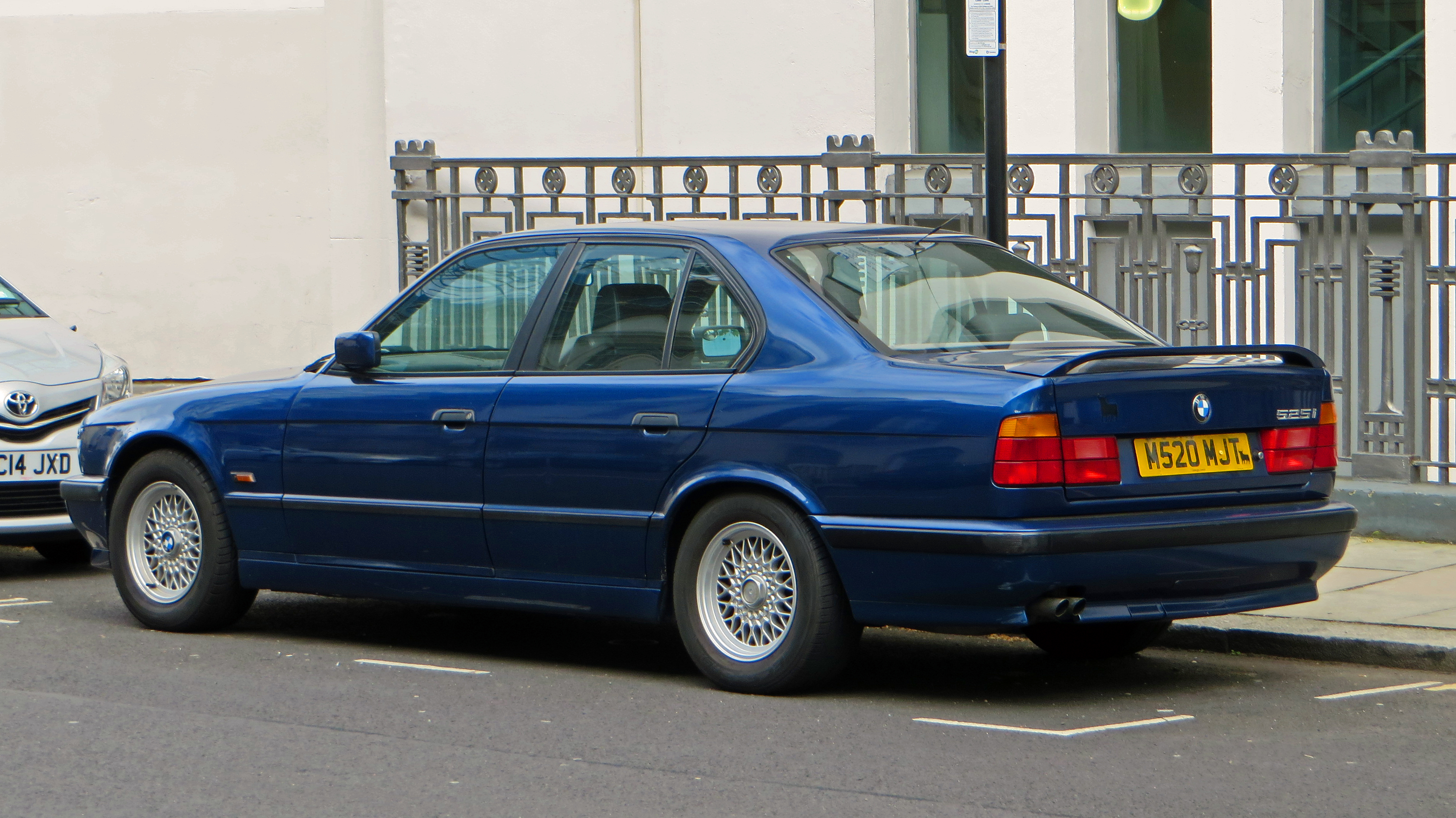
1995 BMW 525i Sport with TRX tires

TRX tires were available either as standard or optional equipment on certain models of European makes such as BMW, Audi, Mercedes-Benz, Citroën, Peugeot, Ford, Ferrari, Alfa Romeo, Renault, and SAAB. They were also available on certain models of the Ford Mustang, Ford Thunderbird, Mercury Capri, Mercury Cougar, and Mercury Lynx during the 1980s.

Although most TRX tires were produced by Michelin, a few sizes were made by Avon, Continental, Goodyear (mainly for the American market) and Dunlop. Dunlop fitted their version of the TRX tire as standard equipment on Austin Montegos and Austin Mini Metros.

== TRX sizes ==
TRX wheels existed in diameters from 315 millimetres (12.4 in) to 415 millimetres (16.3 in)

Some common TRX sizes and vehicles:

Size Application

- 160/65 R 315 TRX Innocenti Turbo De Tomaso (1984-1989), Austin Metro
- 160/65 SR 340 TRX Citroën Visa GT
- 165/70 R 365 TRX Ford Escort GT, EXP, Mercury Lynx RS
- 170/65 R 365 TRX Citroën BX, Peugeot 305
- 180/65 HR 390 TRX SAAB 900 S and Turbo (1980/81)
- 190/65 HR 390 TRX Citroën CX, Ford Granada, Mercedes 200, 220, 240, Peugeot 504 Coupé, Peugeot 505, Peugeot 604, Renault 30TX
- 190/55 VR 340 TRX Alpine A310 V6 (AV), Renault 5 Turbo (AV), Alfasud Ti
- 210/65 VR 365 TRX Talbot Tagora SX
- 220/55 VR 365 TRX Alpine A310 V6 (AR), Renault 5 Turbo (AR)
- 200/60 VR 390 TRX BMW 518, 520, 525, 528, 728, Mercedes 200, 220, 240, 300
- 210/55 VR 390 TRX Citroën CX 25 GTI Turbo
- 220/55 VR 390 TRX BMW 525, 528, 533i, 535, M535I, 635 Csi, 728, 735i. Ford LTD Ford Mustang, Thunderbird. Mercury Capri, Cougar. Ferrari 208, 308, Mondial 3, 2 (AV)
- 240/55 VR 390 TRX Ferrari Mondial 8 & Cabriolet, Mondial 3, 2 (AR)
- 240/55 VR 415 TRX Ferrari 400 i, 512 B, 412 i
- 240/45 ZR 415 TRX BMW M635 CSi, Ferrari 512 BB (AV), Testarossa (AV)
- 280/45 VR 415 TRX Ferrari 512 BB (AR), Testarossa (AR)

Note: AV='front', AR='rear'. Does not include North American vehicles.

Other sizes were available, for instance 160/65 R 315, in TDX version.

== Decline ==
Although the tire performed well and, as noted above, gained favour with some OEMs, its non-standard dimensions proved problematic in the aftermarket. It was also notoriously difficult to remove using basic tools, a consequence of the deliberately designed strong fit between the tire bead and rim.

Rival manufacturers, such as Dunlop, produced replacement wheels and tires for popular cars, specifically targeting high-performance or winter conditions.

Over time, advances in tire technology caught up with the TRX line, enabling similar performance and greater convenience at a lower cost. TRX tires are now produced only as replacements for vehicles originally fitted with them. As of 2024, Michelin Classic is producing these tires as part of its catalogue.
