= Daihatsu Terios =

Mini SUV manufactured by Daihatsu

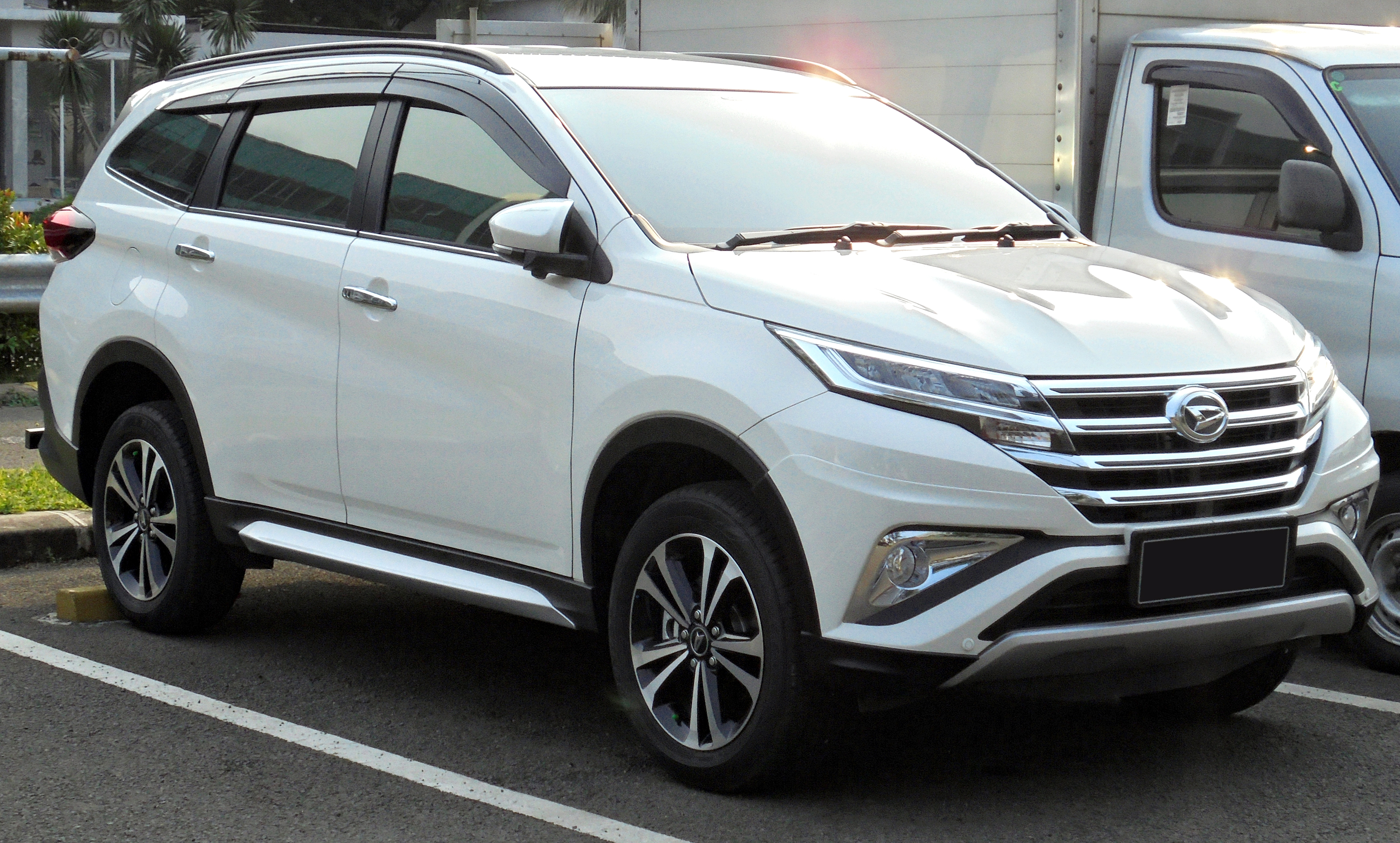
- 2018 Daihatsu Terios R Deluxe (F800RG, Indonesia)

Overview
- Manufacturer: Daihatsu
- Also called: Daihatsu Taruna (Indonesia, 1999–2006); Daihatsu Be‣go (Japan, 2006–2016); Toyota Cami (Japan, 1999–2006); Toyota Rush (2006–present); Perodua Kembara (Malaysia, 1998–2008); Perodua Nautica (Malaysia, 2008–2009); Perodua Aruz (Malaysia, January 2019–present)
- Production: April 1997 – present

Body and chassis
- Class: Mini SUV (1997–2017); Compact SUV (2006–present); Kei car (Terios Kid, 1998–2012)
- Body style: 5-door SUV
- Layout: Front-engine, rear-wheel-drive (1997–present); Front-engine, four-wheel-drive (1997–2017)
- Chassis: Unibody

Chronology
- Predecessor: Daihatsu Rocky/Feroza/Sportrak (F300)

The Daihatsu Terios (Japanese: ダイハツ・テリオス, Hepburn: Daihatsu Teriosu) is a mini SUV produced by the Japanese automobile manufacturer Daihatsu since 1997 as the successor to the F300 series Rocky. It was initially offered in both short- and long-wheelbase configurations before the former stopped production in 2016 to be replaced by the A200 series Rocky crossover in 2019. The long-wheelbase variant is available mainly for the Indonesian market with three-row seating options. A smaller kei car model called the Terios Kid/Lucia was also available for the first-generation model.

Rear-wheel drive is standard across all generations, while four-wheel drive option was available for the first- and second-generation models. The suspension uses an independent MacPherson strut setup for the front and a multi-link coil-sprung setup for the rear with live/solid axle.

Since August 2016, the Terios has been sold exclusively in Indonesia. Throughout three generations, it has also been marketed by Toyota and Perodua under various nameplates as well.

The name "Terios" is originated from the Old Greek word, which is roughly translated to "making dreams come true".

== First generation (J100/F500; 1997) ==
First generation
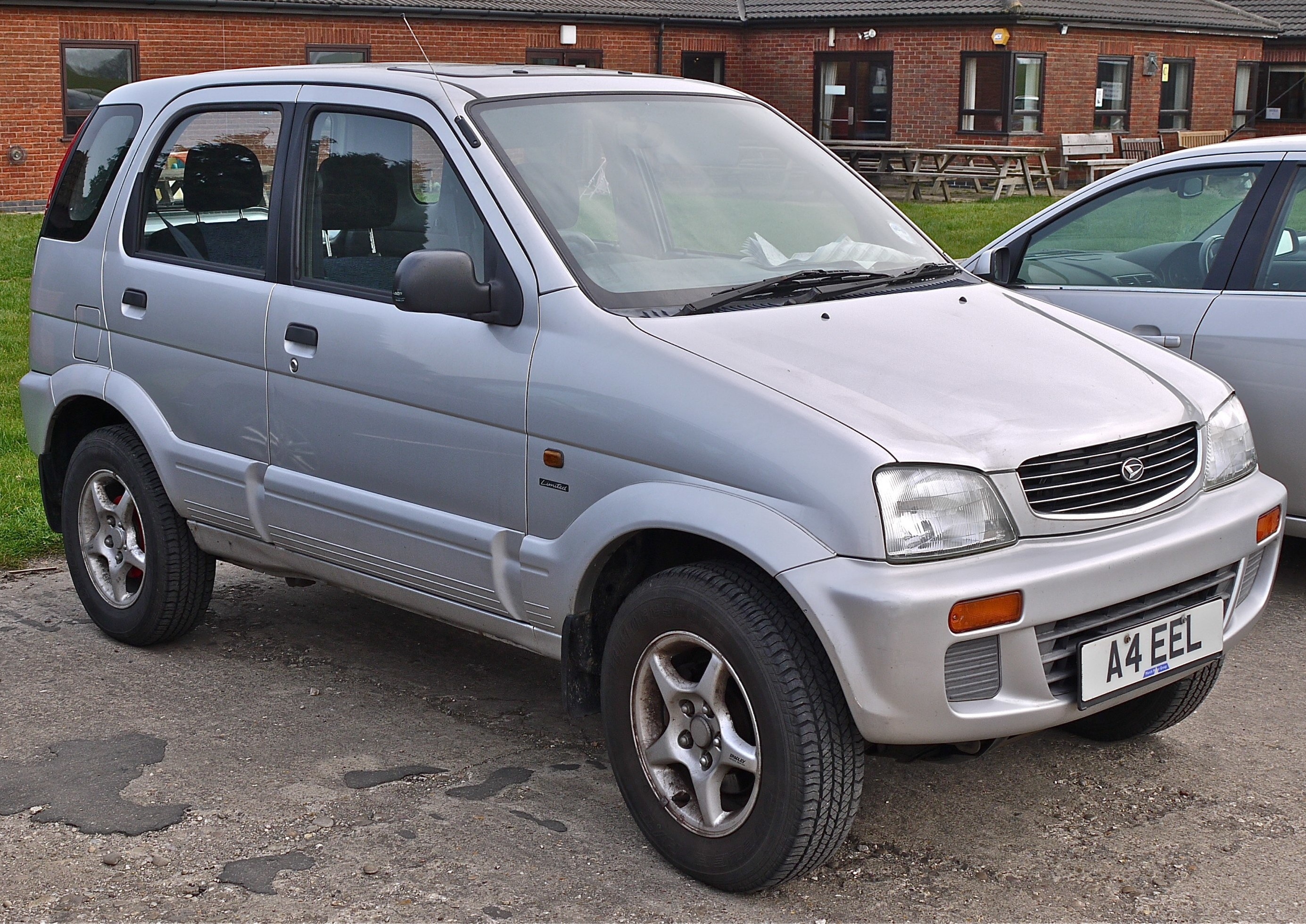
- Daihatsu Terios (pre-facelift, UK)

Overview
- Model code: J100; F500 (Taruna)
- Also called: Daihatsu Taruna (Indonesia); Toyota Cami (Japan); Perodua Kembara (Malaysia); Dario Terios (China); Premier Rio (India); Zotye Nomad (South Africa)
- Production: April 1997 – January 2006; October 1998 – May 2012 (Terios Kid); May 1999 – January 2006 (Toyota Cami); 2012–2015 (Premier Rio); July 1999 – November 2006 (Taruna)
- Assembly: Japan: Nakatsu, Ōita (Daihatsu Auto Body); Venezuela: Cumaná, Sucre (Toyota de Venezuela); Malaysia: Rawang, Selangor (PMSB, Kembara); Indonesia: Sunter, North Jakarta (ADM, Taruna); China: Xiqing, Tianjin (Huali Dario)

Body and chassis
- Class: Mini SUV; Kei car (Terios Kid, 1998–2012)
- Layout: Front-engine, rear-wheel-drive; Front-engine, four-wheel-drive
- Chassis: Unibody

Powertrain
- Engine: Petrol: 658 cc EF-DEM/DET turbo I3 (Terios Kid/Lucia); 1.3 L HC-EJ I4; 1.3 L K3-VE I4; 1.3 L K3-VET turbo I4 (Terios/Cami); 1.5 L HE-E I4 (Taruna); 1.6 L HD-C/E I4 (Taruna)
- Power output: 44–47 kW (60–64 PS; 59–63 hp) (EF-DEM/EF-DET); 63–68 kW (86–92 PS; 84–91 hp) (HC-EJ); 66 kW (90 PS; 89 hp) (K3-VE); 103 kW (140 PS; 138 hp) (K3-VET); 63 kW (86 PS; 84 hp) (HE-E); 63 kW (86 PS; 84 hp) (HD-C); 66 kW (90 PS; 89 hp) (HD-E)
- Transmission: 5-speed manual; 4-speed automatic

Dimensions
- Wheelbase: 2,420 mm (95.3 in) (Terios series/Perodua Kembara); 2,500 mm (98.4 in) (Taruna C-series); 2,750 mm (108.3 in) (Taruna F-series)
- Length: 3,785–3,865 mm (149.0–152.2 in); 3,395 mm (133.7 in) (Terios Kid/Lucia); 4,175–4,275 mm (164.4–168.3 in) (Taruna C-series); 4,425–4,525 mm (174.2–178.1 in) (Taruna F-series)
- Width: 1,555 mm (61.2 in); 1,475 mm (58.1 in) (Terios Kid/Lucia); 1,620 mm (63.8 in) (Taruna)
- Height: 1,675–1,760 mm (65.9–69.3 in); 1,675–1,740 mm (65.9–68.5 in) (Terios Kid/Lucia); 1,710–1,800 mm (67.3–70.9 in) (Taruna)
- Kerb weight: 1,025–1,090 kg (2,260–2,403 lb); 960–990 kg (2,116–2,183 lb) (Terios Kid/Lucia); 1,100–1,240 kg (2,425–2,734 lb) (Taruna)

Chronology
- Successor: Daihatsu Cast Activa (Terios Kid/Lucia); Daihatsu Taft (LA900) (Terios Kid/Lucia)

Initially previewed as the MS-X97, the first-generation Terios was available as a five-door wagon, and a smaller kei car model called the Terios Kid, which was only released in Japan. Model codes for the first generation were J100, J102 and J122. The Terios Kid arrived in October 1998 and continued to be built six years after the original Terios had been replaced. By the end of 2002, Daihatsu sold 33,000 units of Terios and 97,000 units of Terios Kid. It was built with a unibody monocoque chassis.

In 2000, Daihatsu gave the Terios a mild facelift both in the exterior and interior of the vehicle. A new chrome grille replaced the black plastic grille. The high-grade model gained electric front windows, central locking, rear seat head restraints, alloy wheels, roof rails and a roof-mounted rear spoiler. Mechanically, the 1.3-litre SOHC four-cylinder engine fitted to the previous model had been replaced by the new 1.3-litre DOHC four-cylinder engine. Power was also increased by 3 kW (4 hp; 4 PS). A sport version of the K3-VET engine was produced in Japan.

In Australia, a limited edition sports series was introduced in 2001 with only 200 units being available. The vehicle had body colour matching bumpers, different from the two-tone bumper colour on the standard model. Rear spoiler and sunroof became standard. The interior was updated with metallic paint finish on the centre console and dashboard.

This is the first Daihatsu automobile to be assembled in Venezuela, where production began in November 2001.

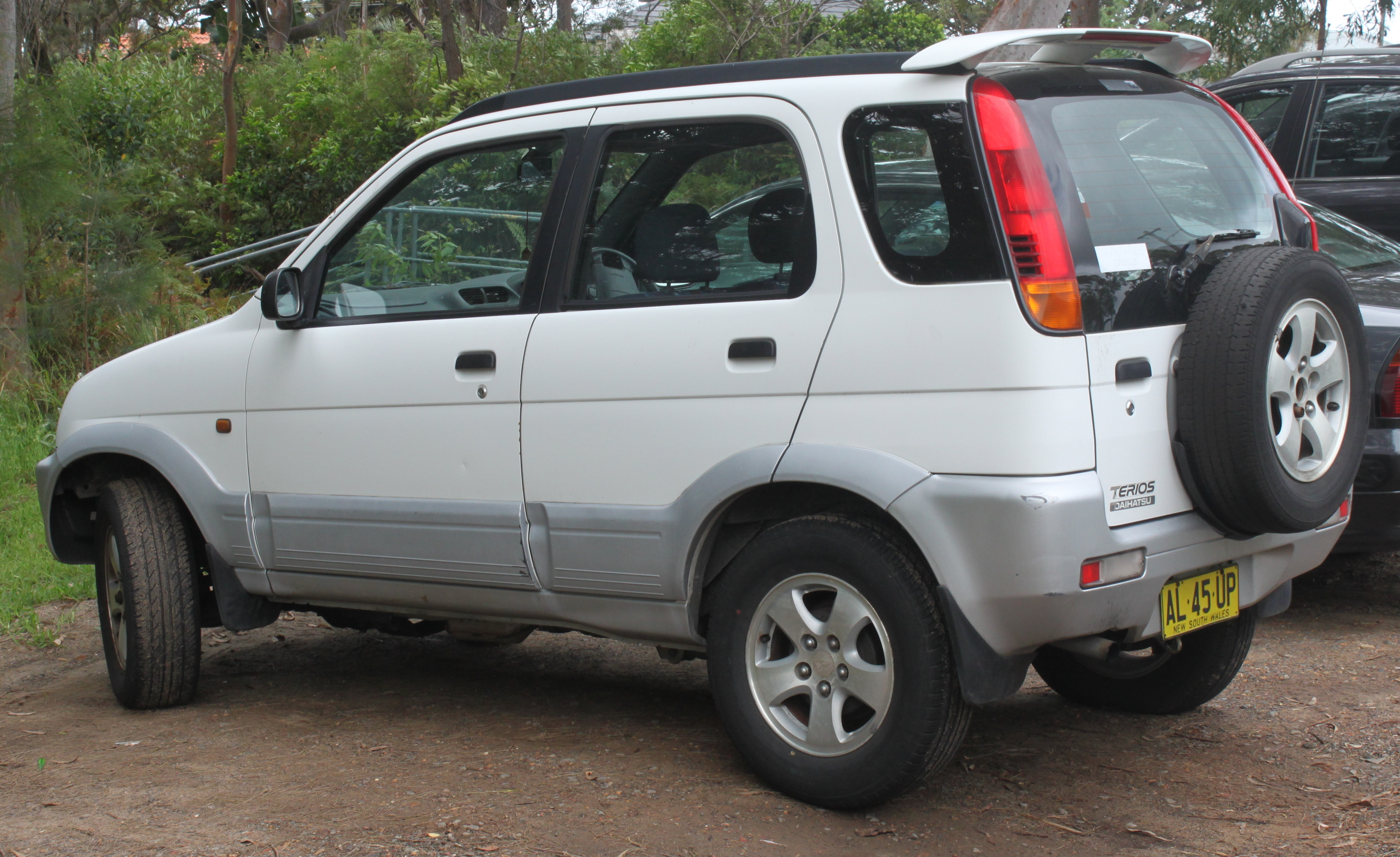
1999 Daihatsu Terios SX (J100; pre-facelift, Australia)

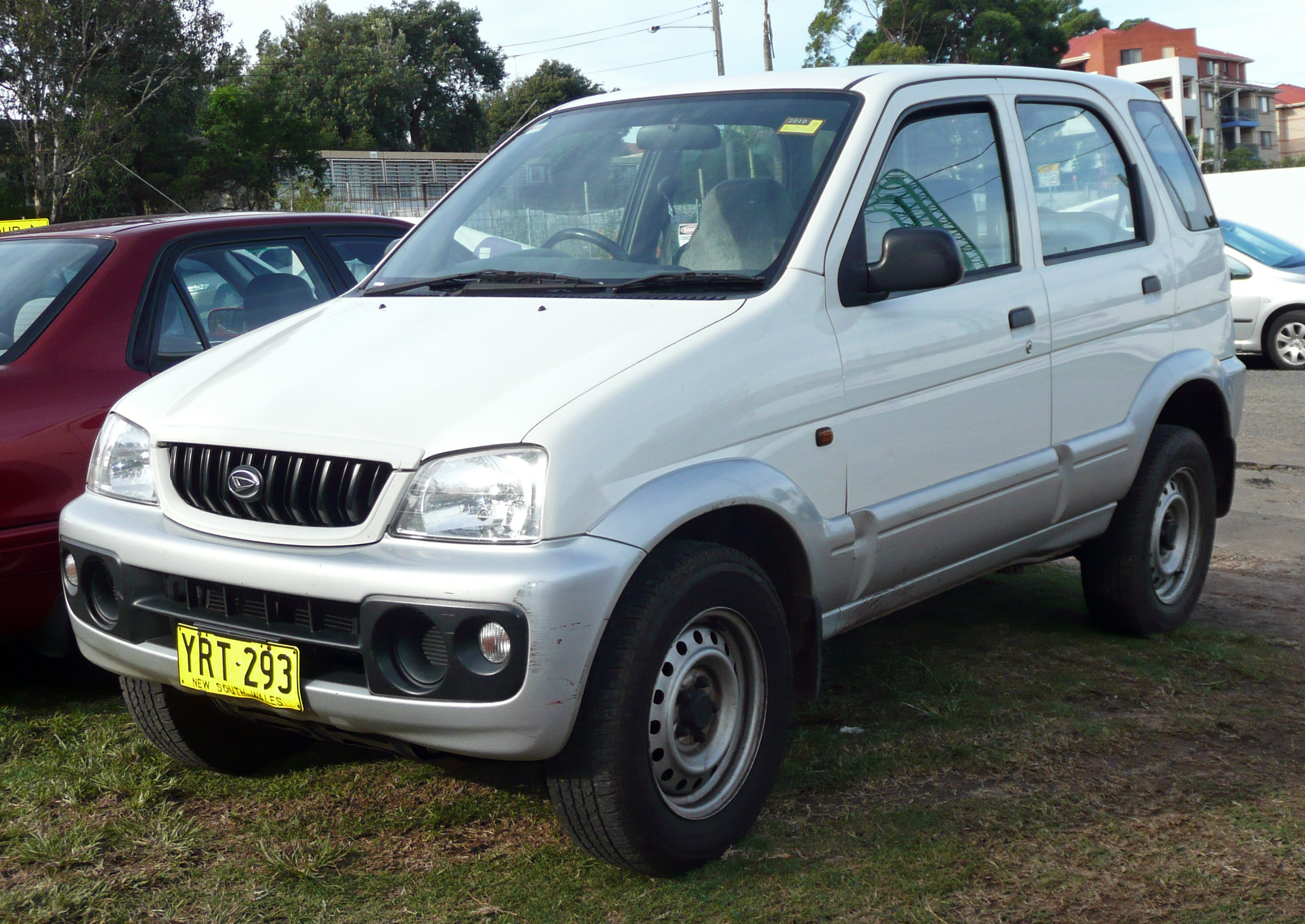
2002 Daihatsu Terios DX (J102G; facelift, Australia)

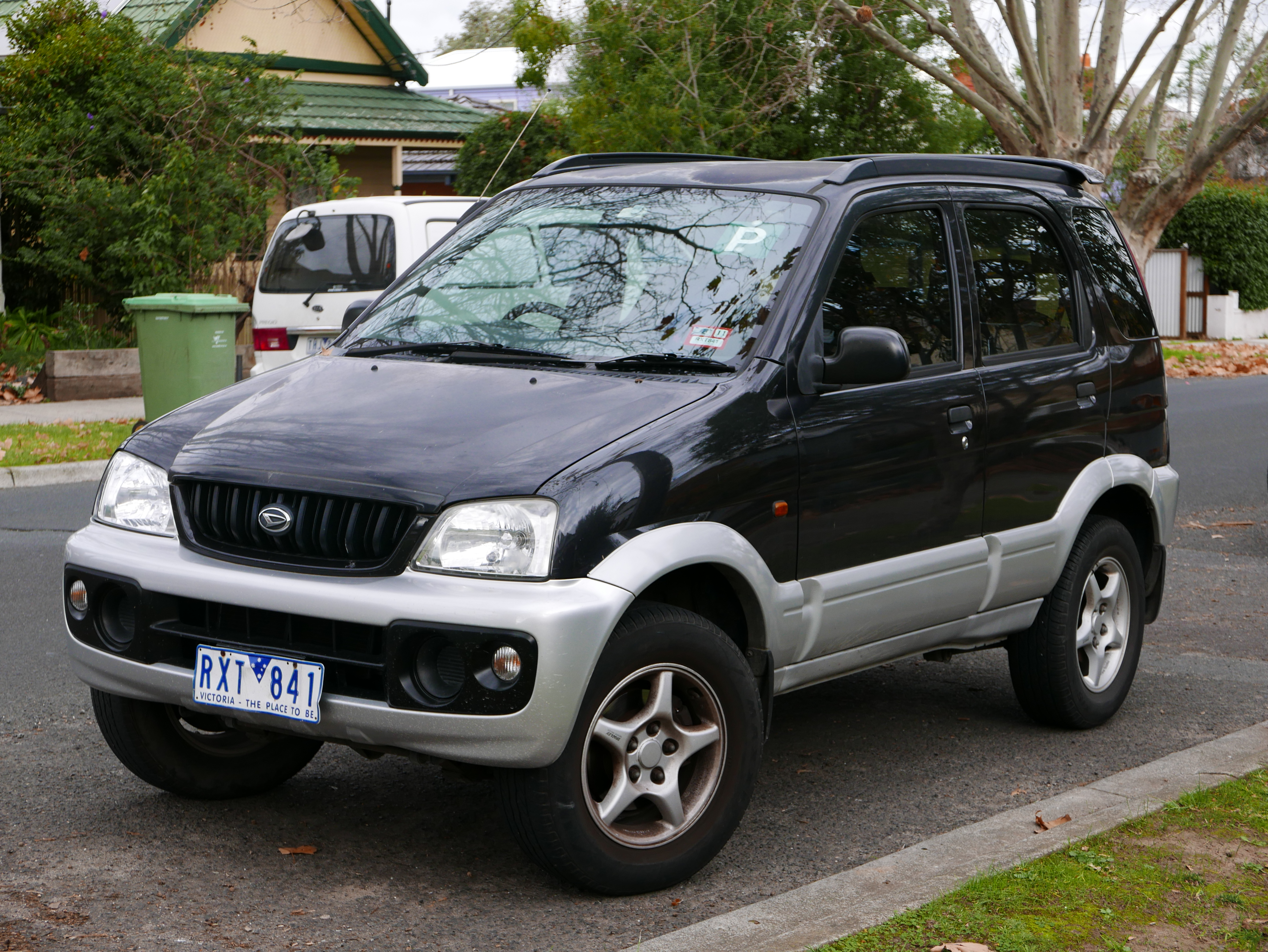
2002 Daihatsu Terios SX (J102G; facelift, Australia)

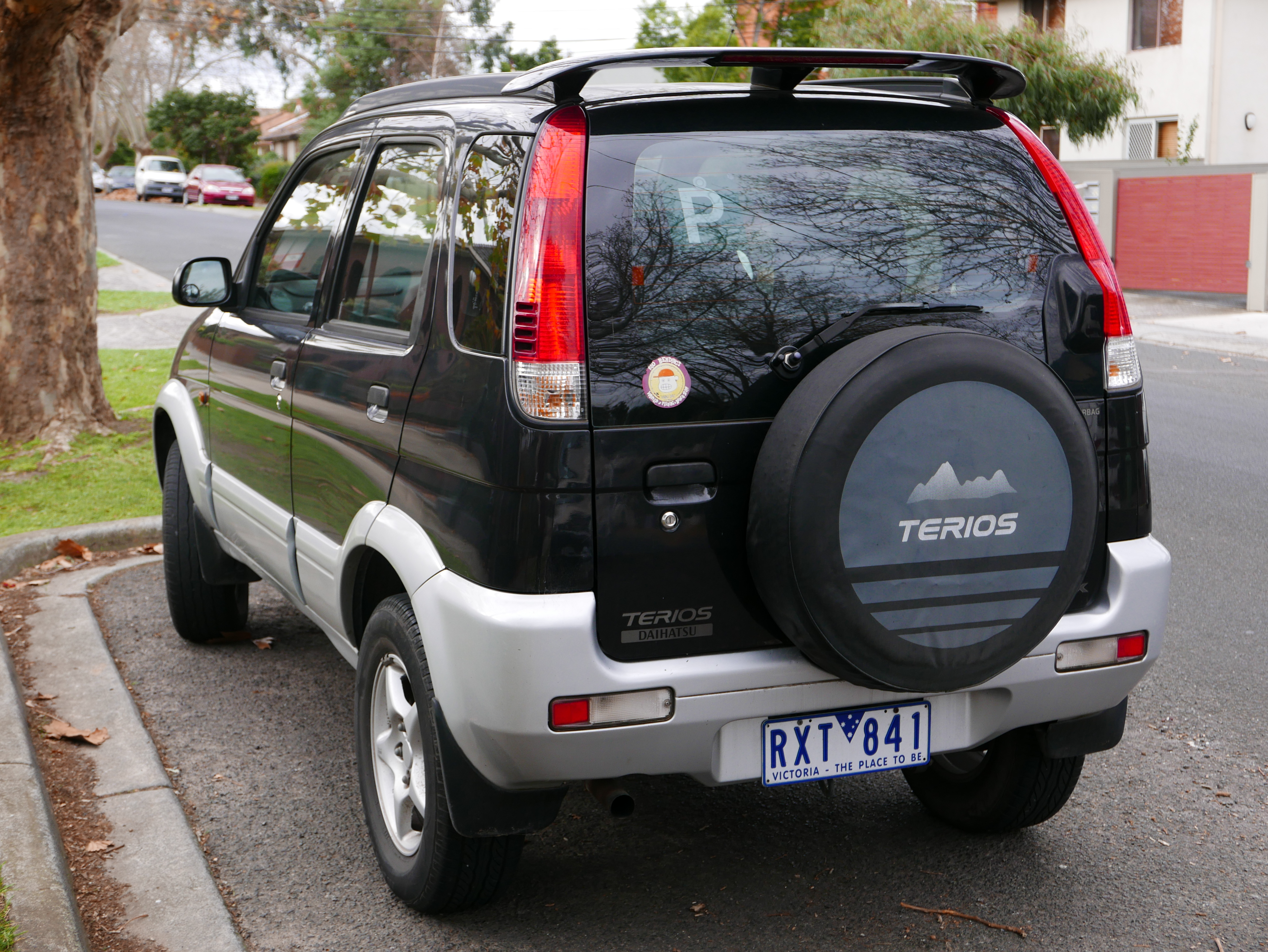
2002 Daihatsu Terios SX (J102G; facelift, Australia)

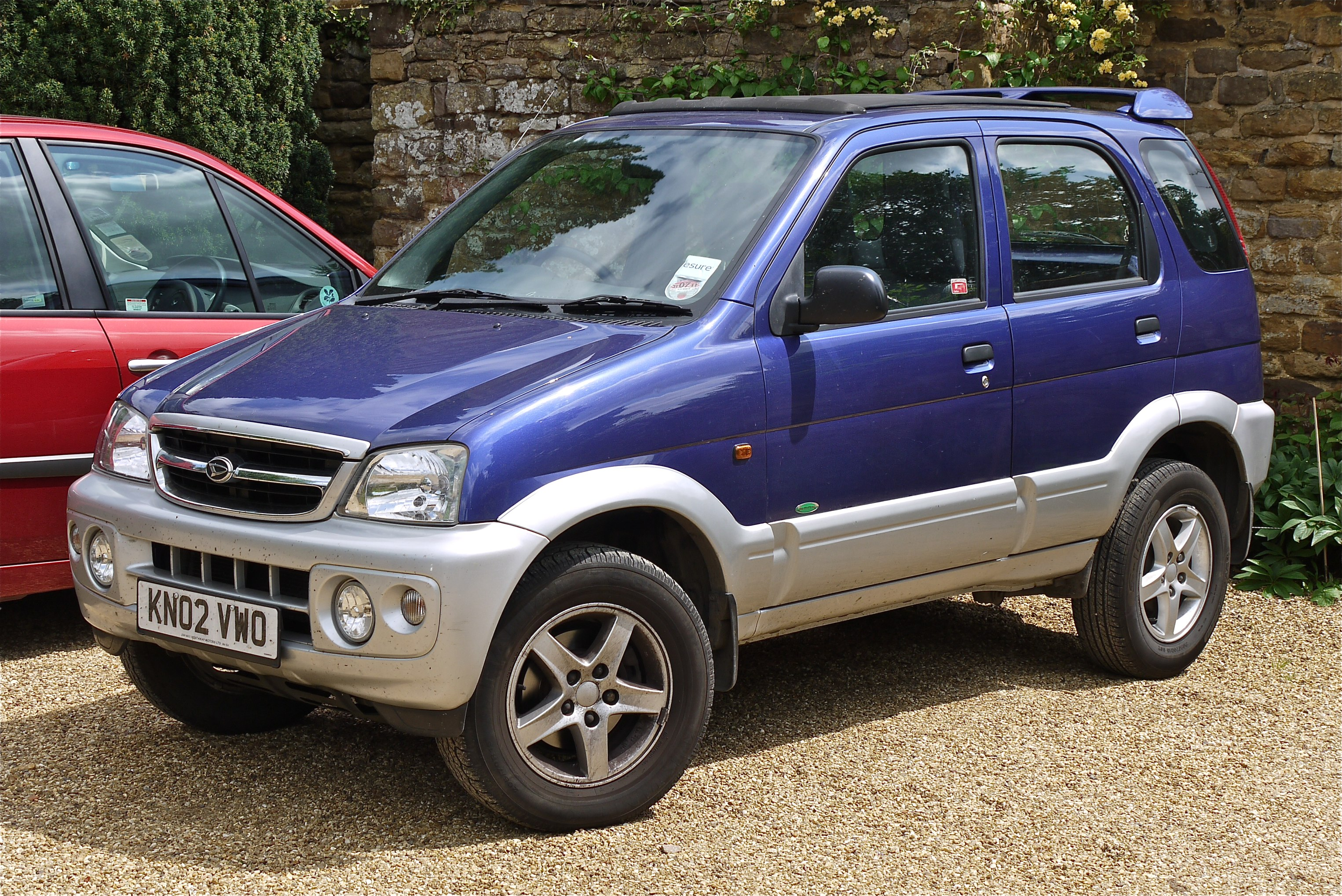
Daihatsu Terios (facelift, UK)

=== Versions ===
- Terios (first generation)
  - J100G 1997-1999 "HC-EJ" SOHC 1295 cc engine 89 PS (65 kW; 88 hp) 4WD
  - J102G 2000-2004 4WD
    - engine "K3-VE" DOHC 1297 cc engine 92 PS (68 kW; 91 hp)
    - engine "K3-VET" DOHC 1297 cc Turbo engine 140 PS (103 kW; 138 hp)
  - J122G 2000-2004 2WD type ( K3-VE / K3-VET )
- Terios Kid (kei model, available in the Japanese domestic market until May 2012)
  - J111G ( EF-DEM ) 1998-2005 Light pressure turbo 658 cc 4WD 60 PS (44 kW; 59 hp)
  - J111G ( EF-DET ) 1998-2012 Inter cooler turbo 658 cc 4WD 64 PS (47 kW; 63 hp)
  - J131G ( EF-DEM ) 1998-2005 Light pressure turbo 658 cc 2WD 60 PS (44 kW; 59 hp)
  - J131G ( EF-DET ) 1998-2012 Inter cooler turbo 658 cc 2WD 64 PS (47 kW; 63 hp)
- Terios Lucia (limited edition)
  - J111G / J131G for 2002-2003 only; variation of Terios Kid (without rear-mounted spare tyre)
- Taruna (Indonesia)
  - F500RV / F520RV 1999-2001 "HD-C" carburettor / "HD-E" EFI SOHC 1589 cc engine 85.7 PS (63 kW; 85 hp) / 90.4 PS (66 kW; 89 hp)
  - F501RV / F521RV 2001-2006 "HE-E" EFI SOHC 1498 cc engine 86.1 PS (63 kW; 85 hp)

=== Markets ===
==== Japan ====
The first-generation Terios was also sold as the Toyota Cami (Japanese: トヨタ・キャミ, Hepburn: Toyota Kyami) in Japan, was released in May 1999. According to Toyota the Cami is portmanteau of the words Casual Mini.

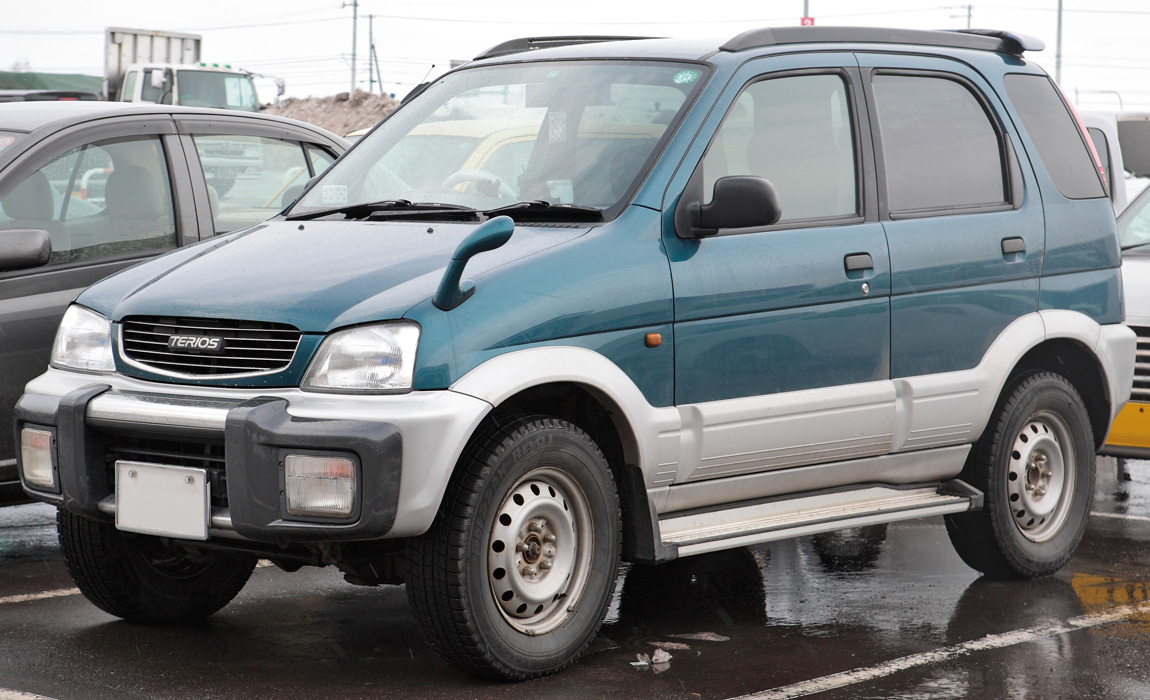
Daihatsu Terios (pre-facelift, Japan)

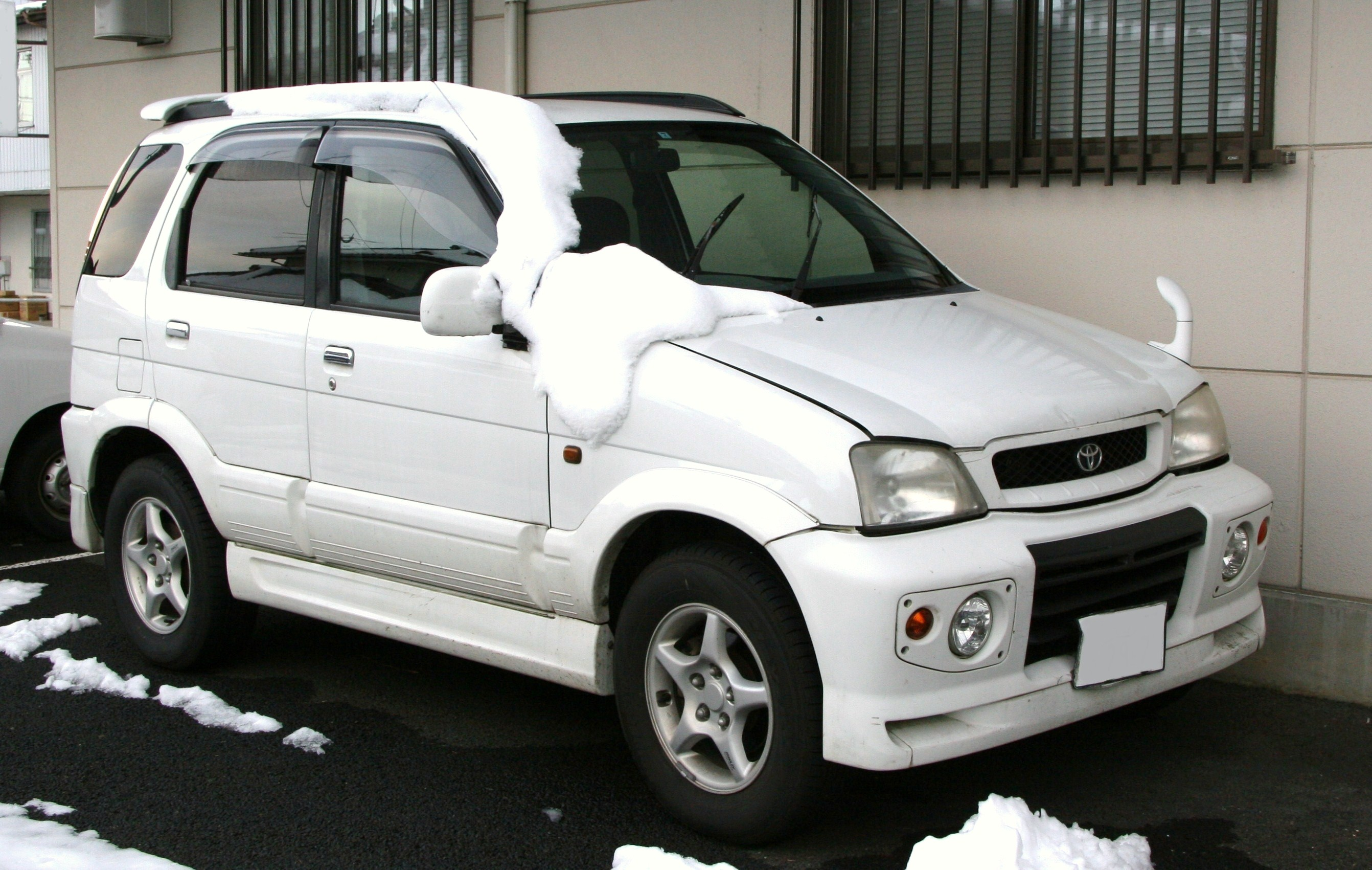
Toyota Cami Q Aero Version (pre-facelift, Japan)

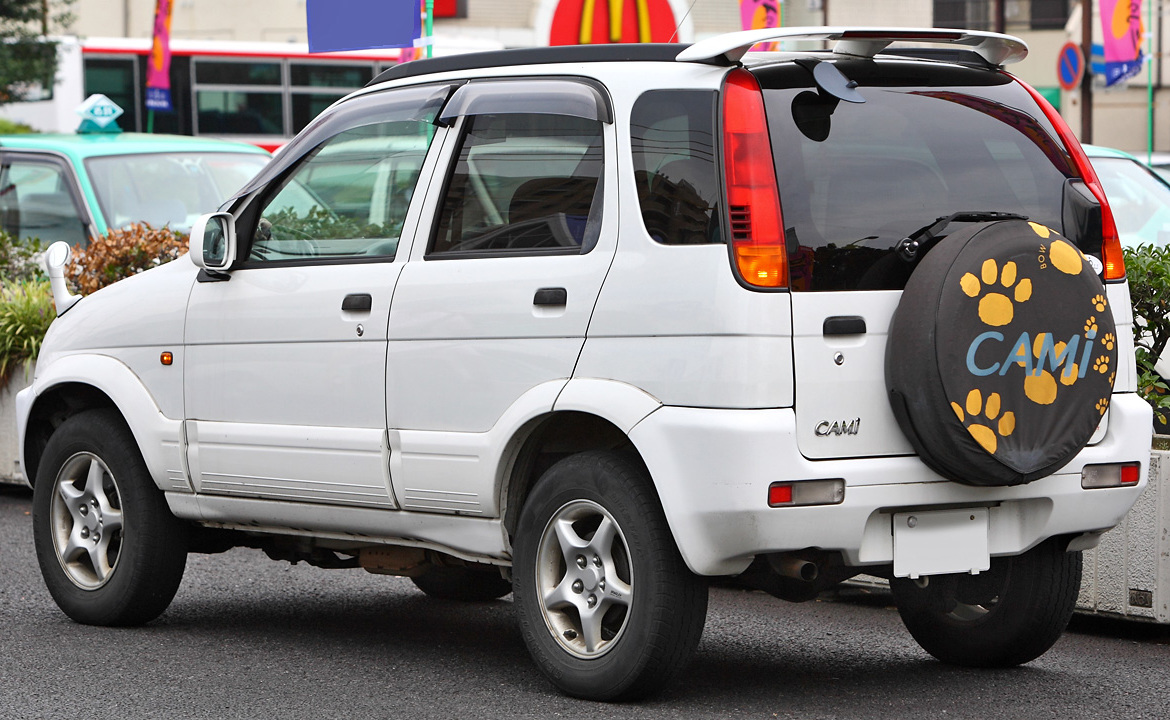
Toyota Cami (pre-facelift, Japan)

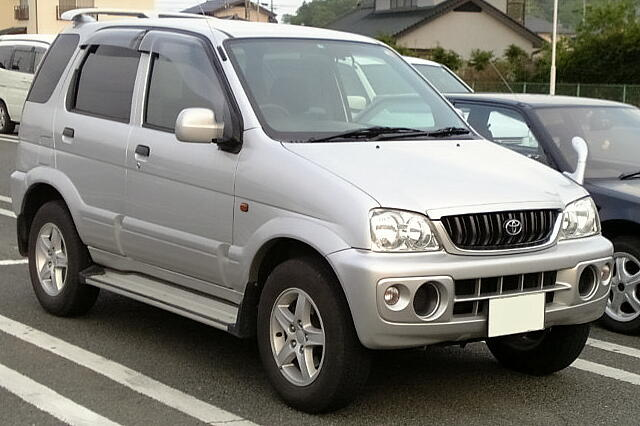
Toyota Cami (facelift, Japan)

===== Terios Kid / Terios Lucia =====
A kei car version called the Terios Kid or Terios Lucia was also available in the local market. The 4WD version of the Terios Kid was introduced in October 1998, with a rear-wheel-drive version following in January 2000. A facelifted version was unveiled at 2003. Production of Terios Kid ended in June 2012.

The Terios Lucia was available from January 2002 until August 2003. Based on the Terios Kid, it features a heavily redesigned bumper and grille, and the spare tire that was mounted on the back door has been removed.

Terios Kid

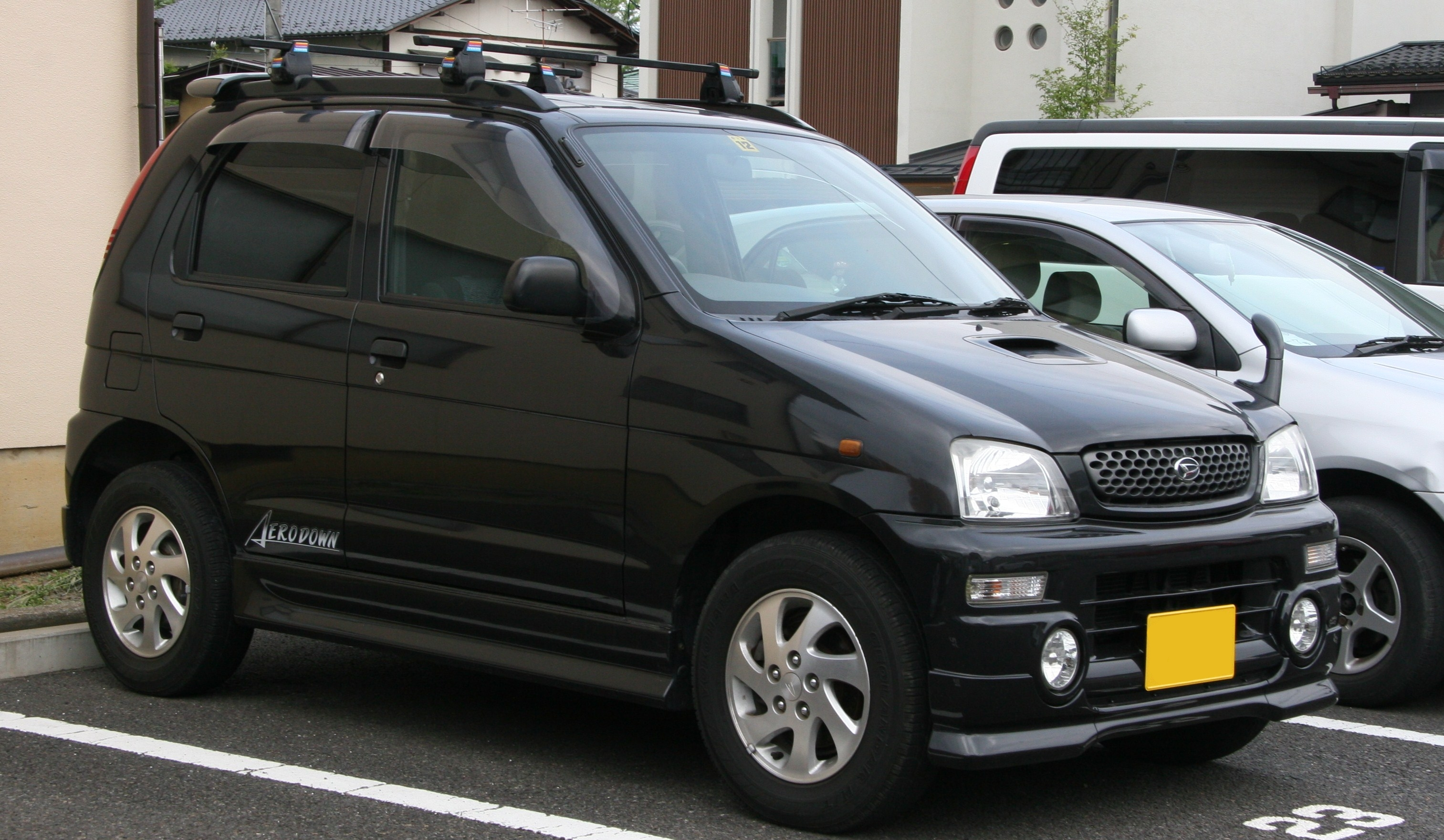
Daihatsu Terios Kid Aerodown (pre-facelift, Japan)

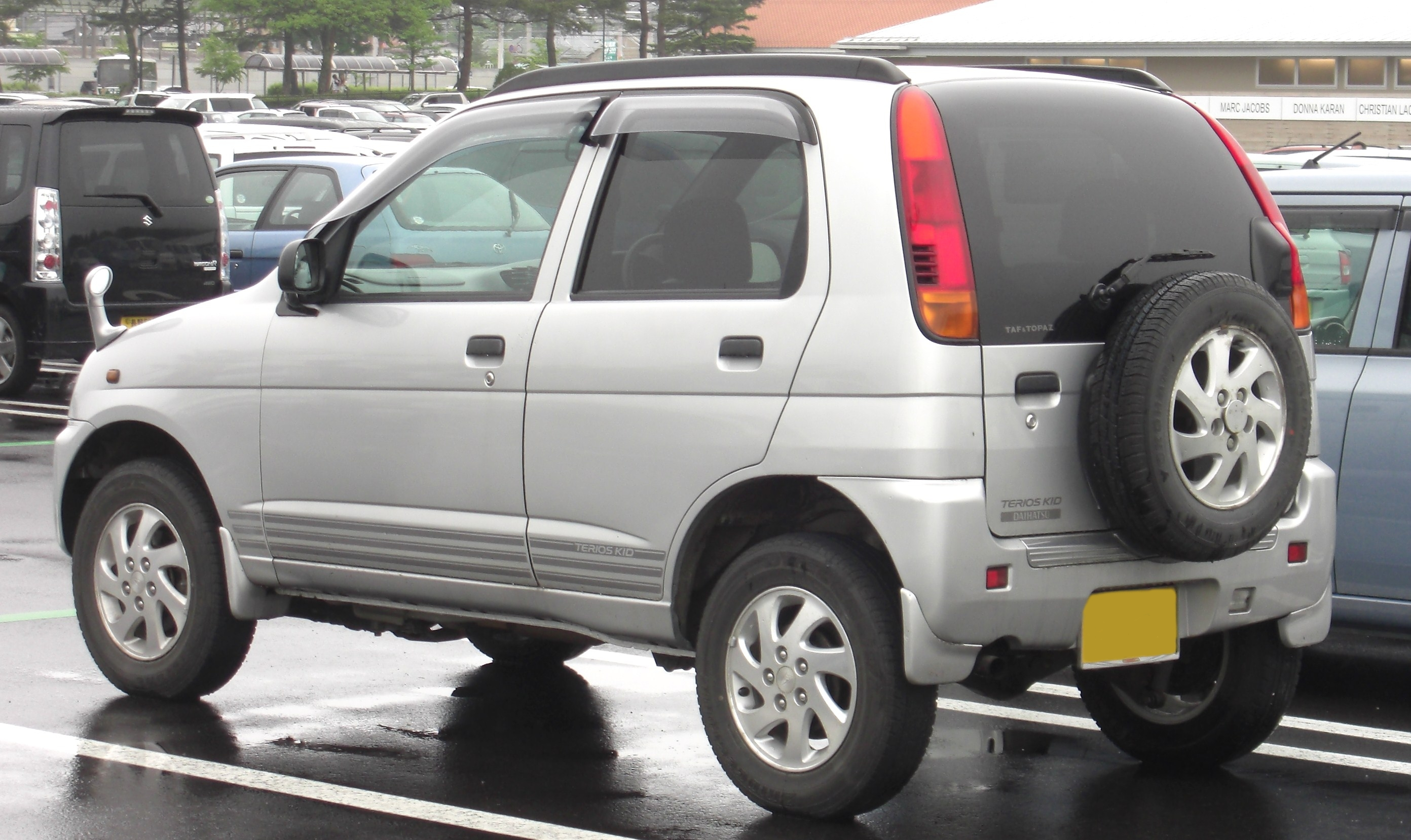
Daihatsu Terios Kid (pre-facelift, Japan)

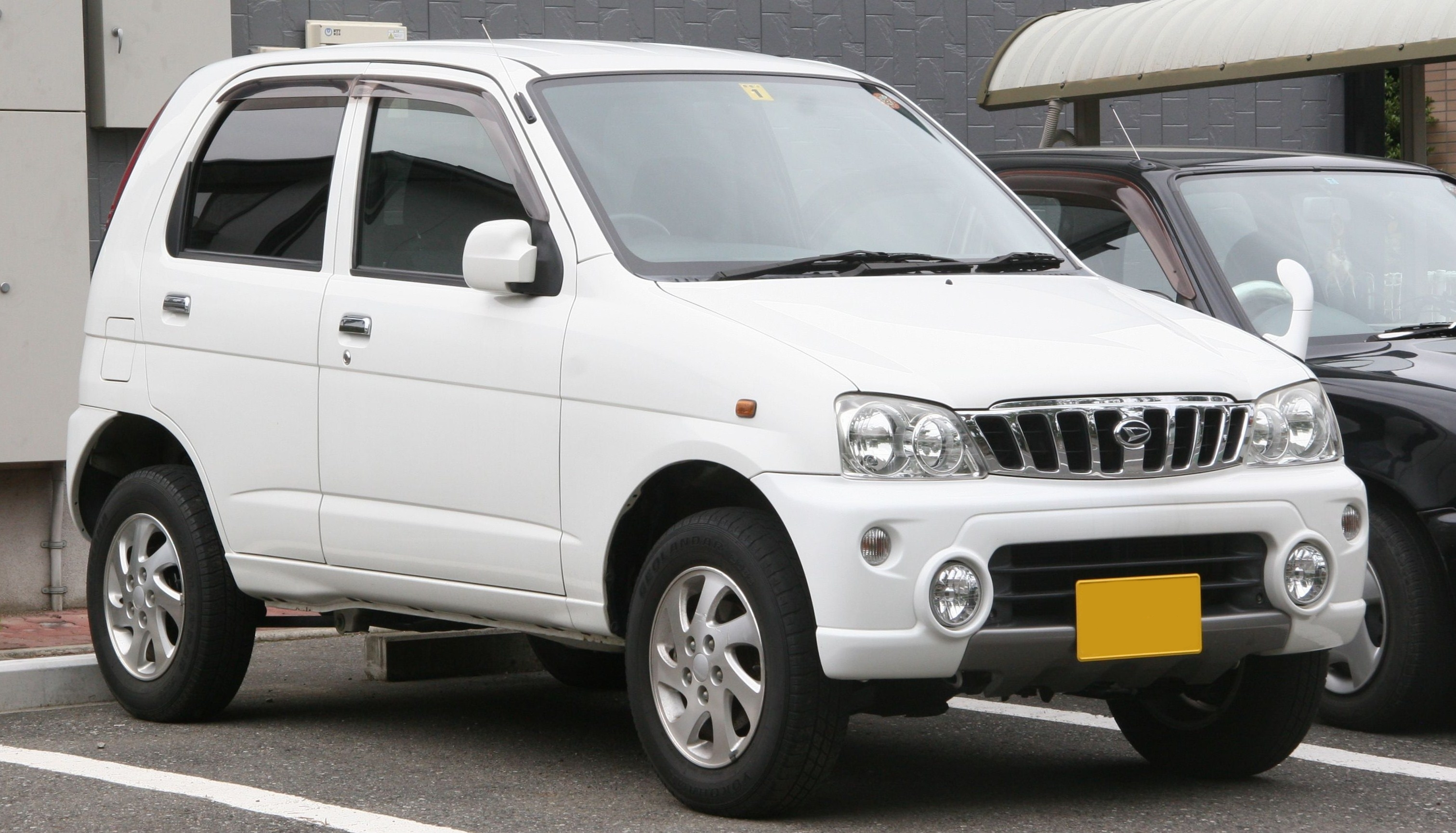
Daihatsu Terios Kid (first facelift, Japan)

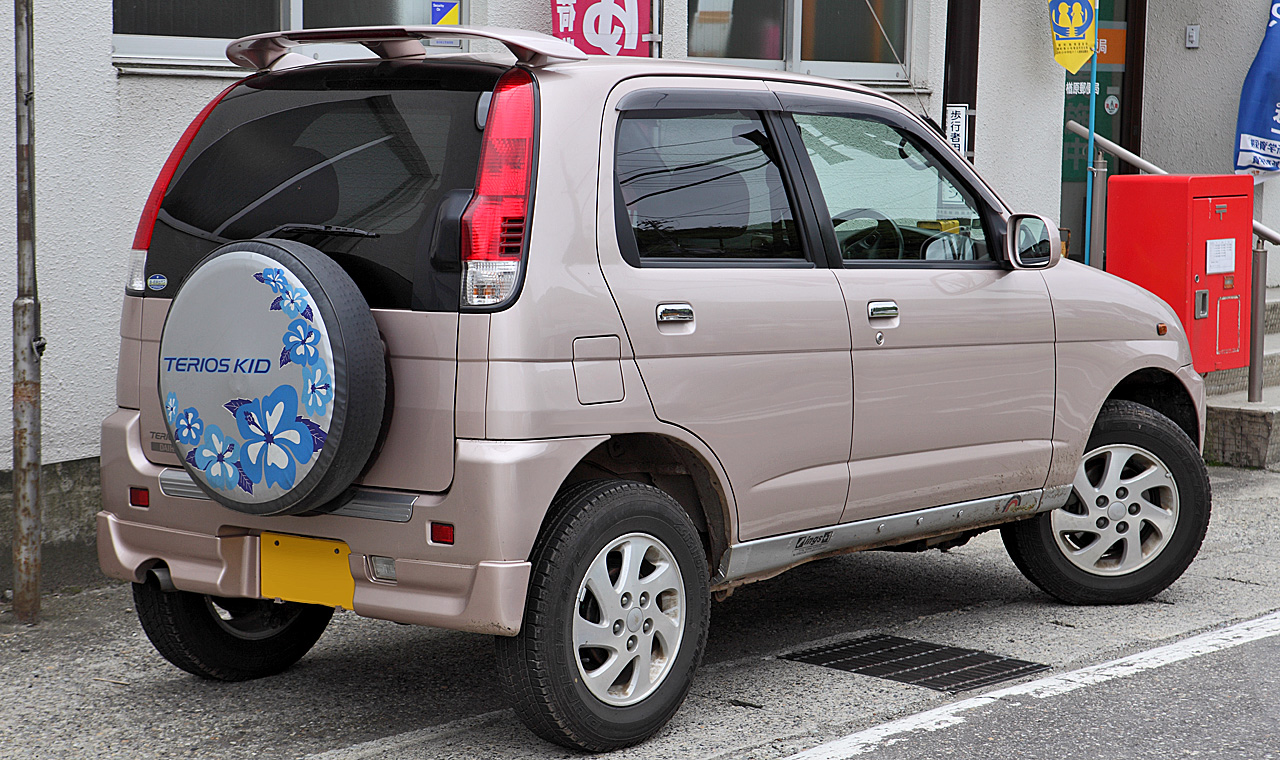
Daihatsu Terios Kid (first facelift, Japan)

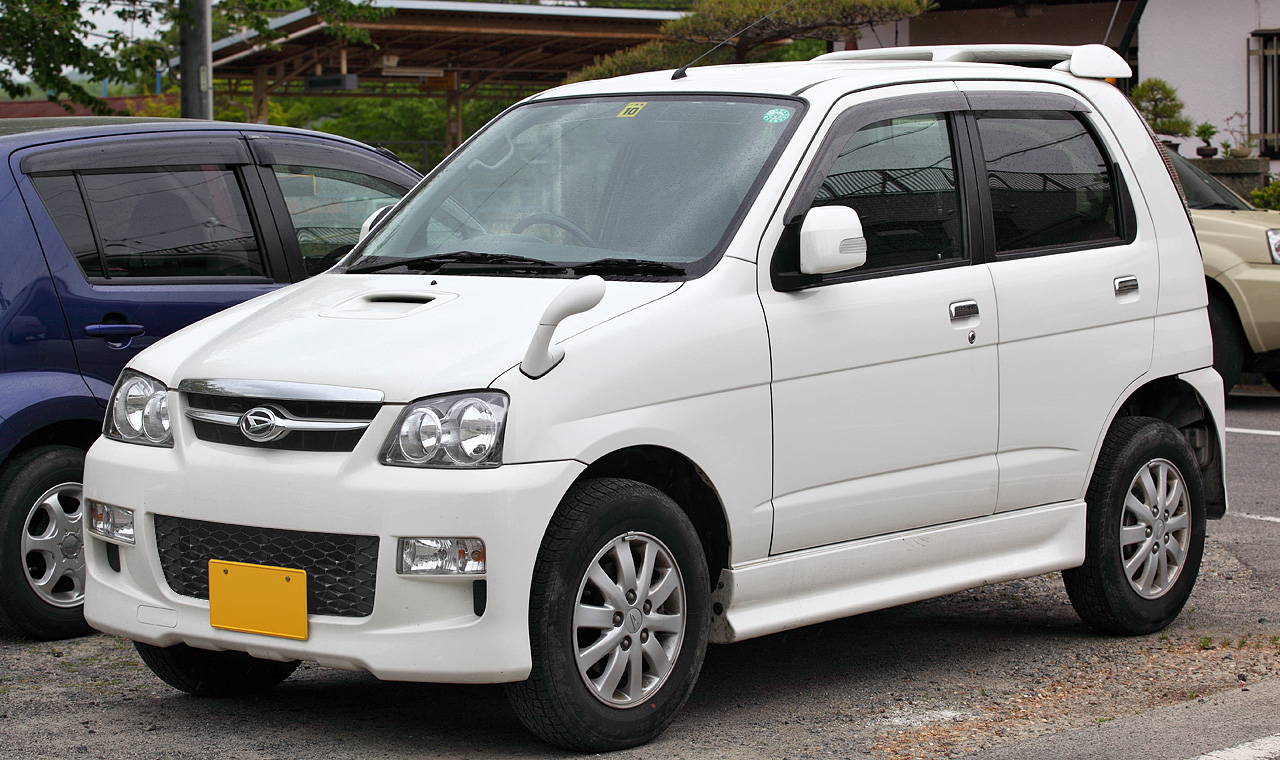
Daihatsu Terios Kid Custom (second facelift, Japan)

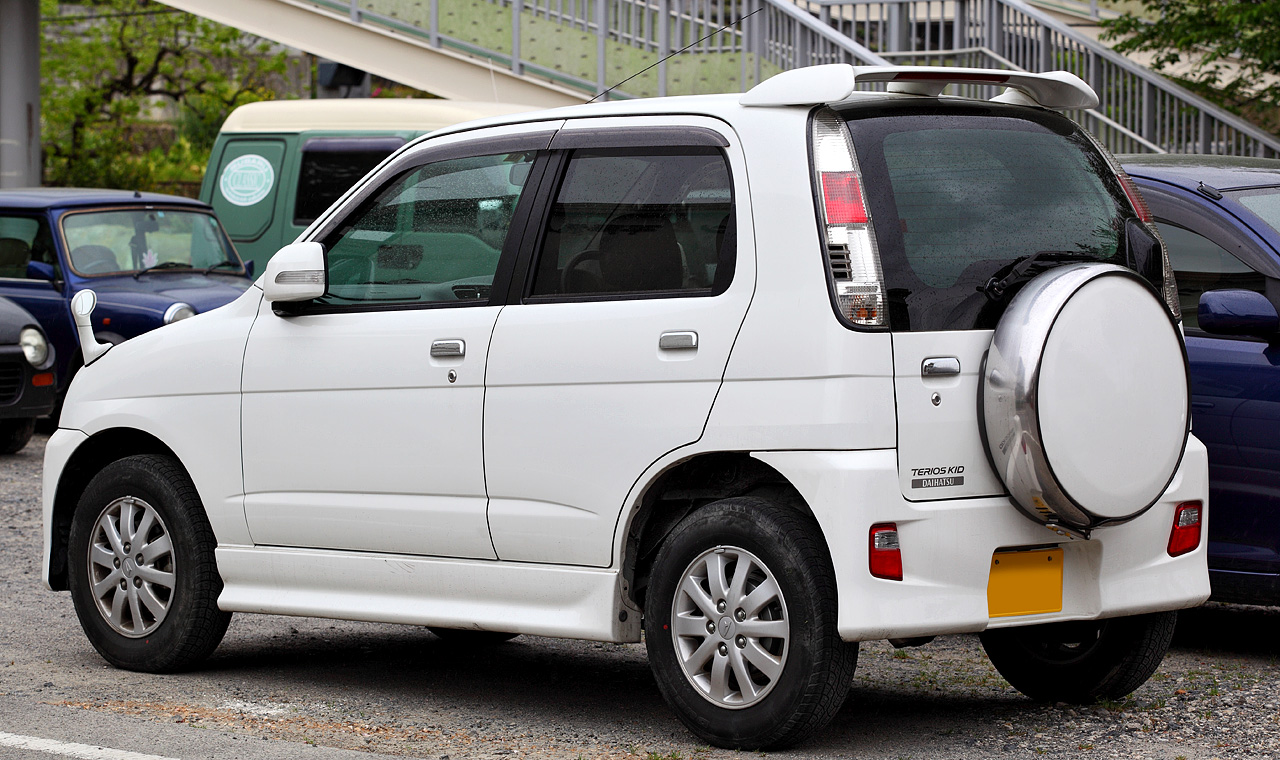
Daihatsu Terios Kid Custom (second facelift, Japan)

Terios Lucia

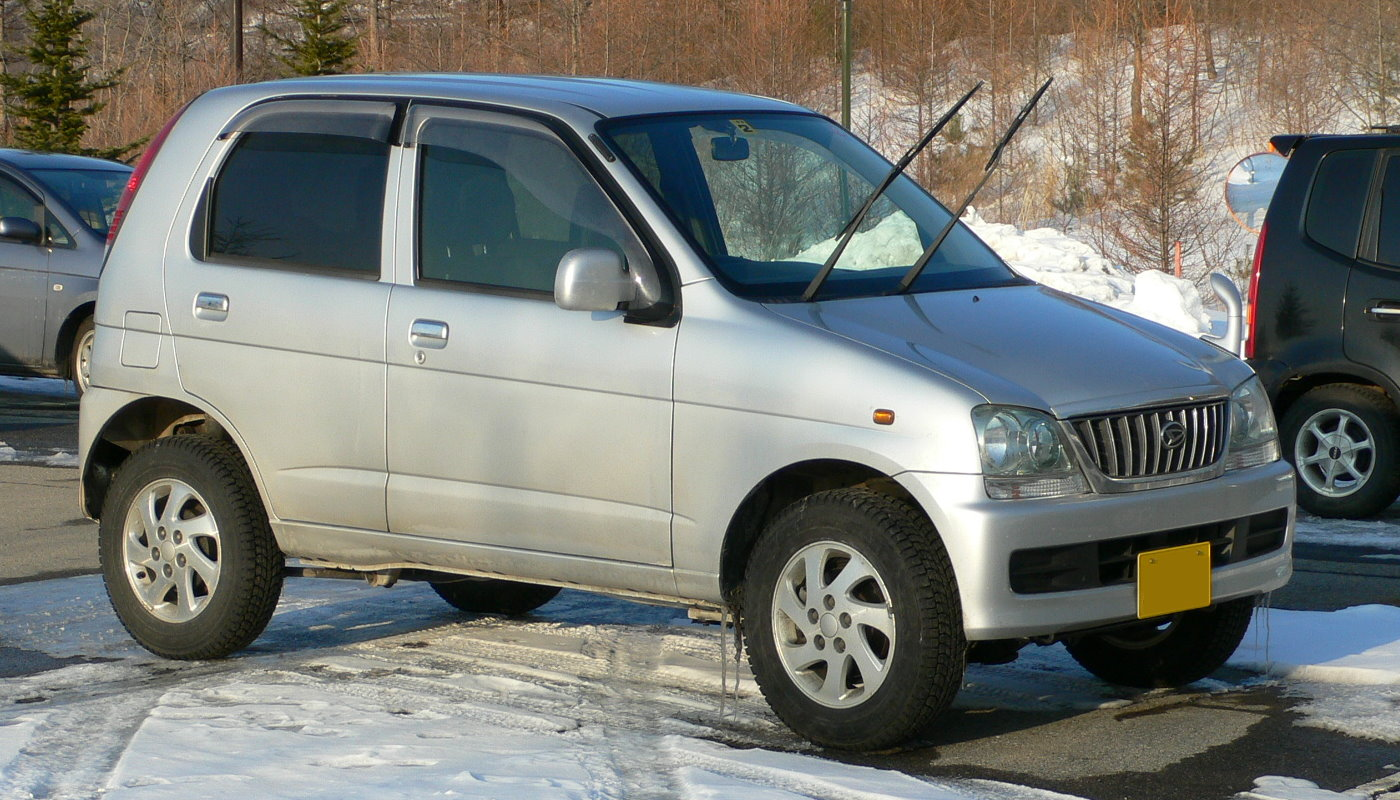
Daihatsu Terios Lucia (Japan)

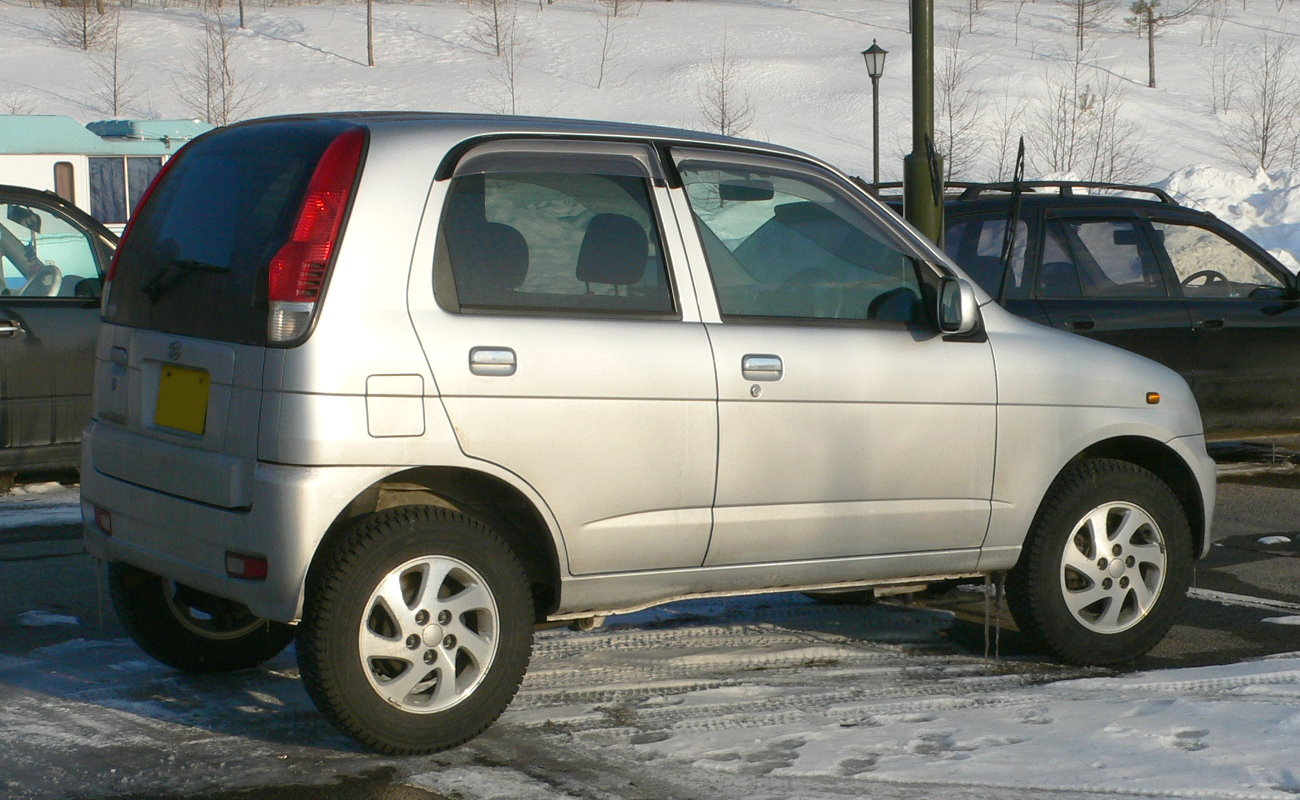
Daihatsu Terios Lucia (Japan)

==== Malaysia ====
In Malaysia, the Terios was locally assembled as the Perodua Kembara by Perodua. It was unveiled in August 1998 and was only available with full-time 4WD. In June 2003, the Kembara was updated with DVVT engines. In July 2004, the Kembara CT Elegance was unveiled and came with ABS, front dual airbags, leather seats, different designed alloy rim, flat type sidestep and cubic printing cluster. It was priced at RM59,988 and only available in one colour: Klasik Gold.

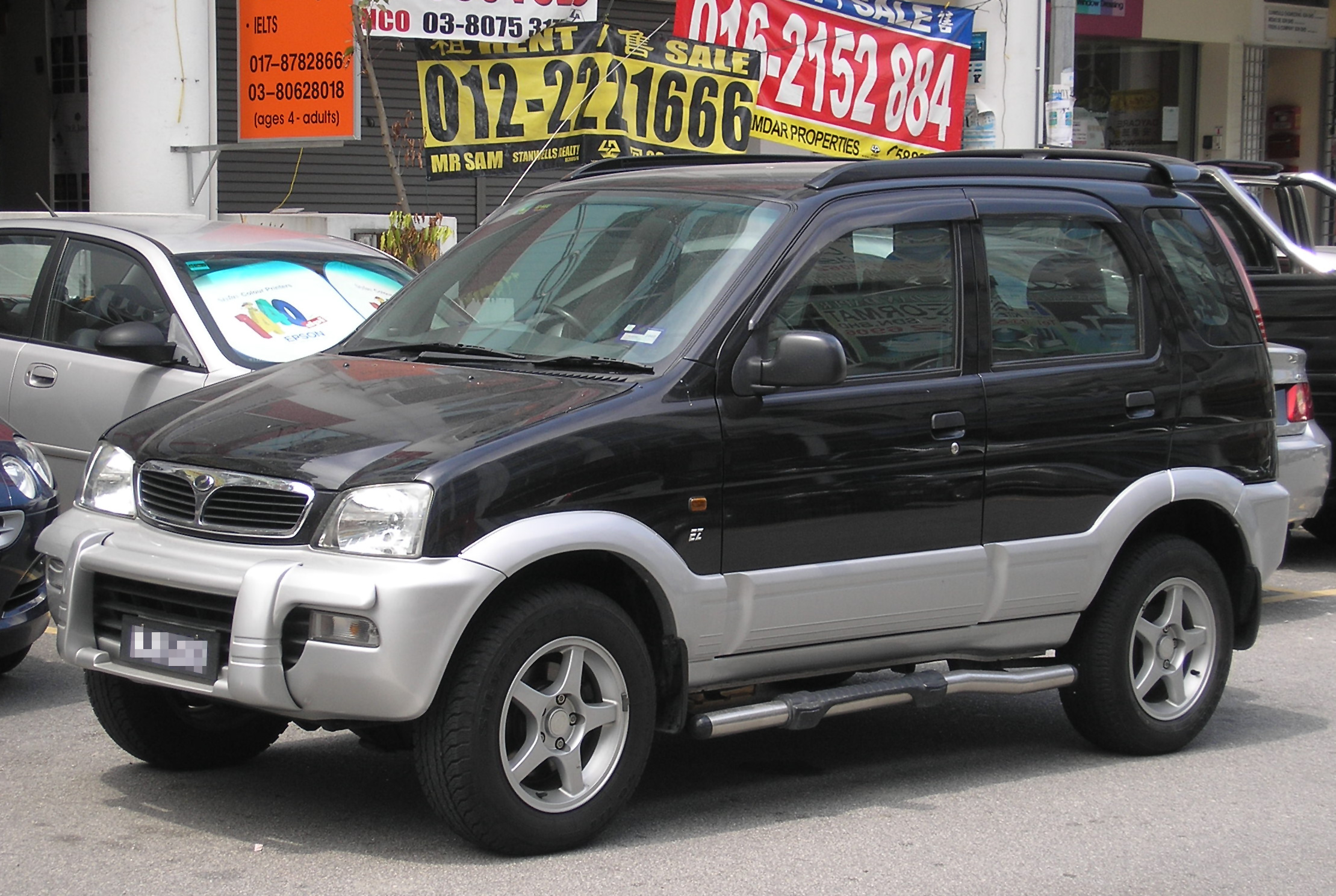
Perodua Kembara (pre-facelift, Malaysia)

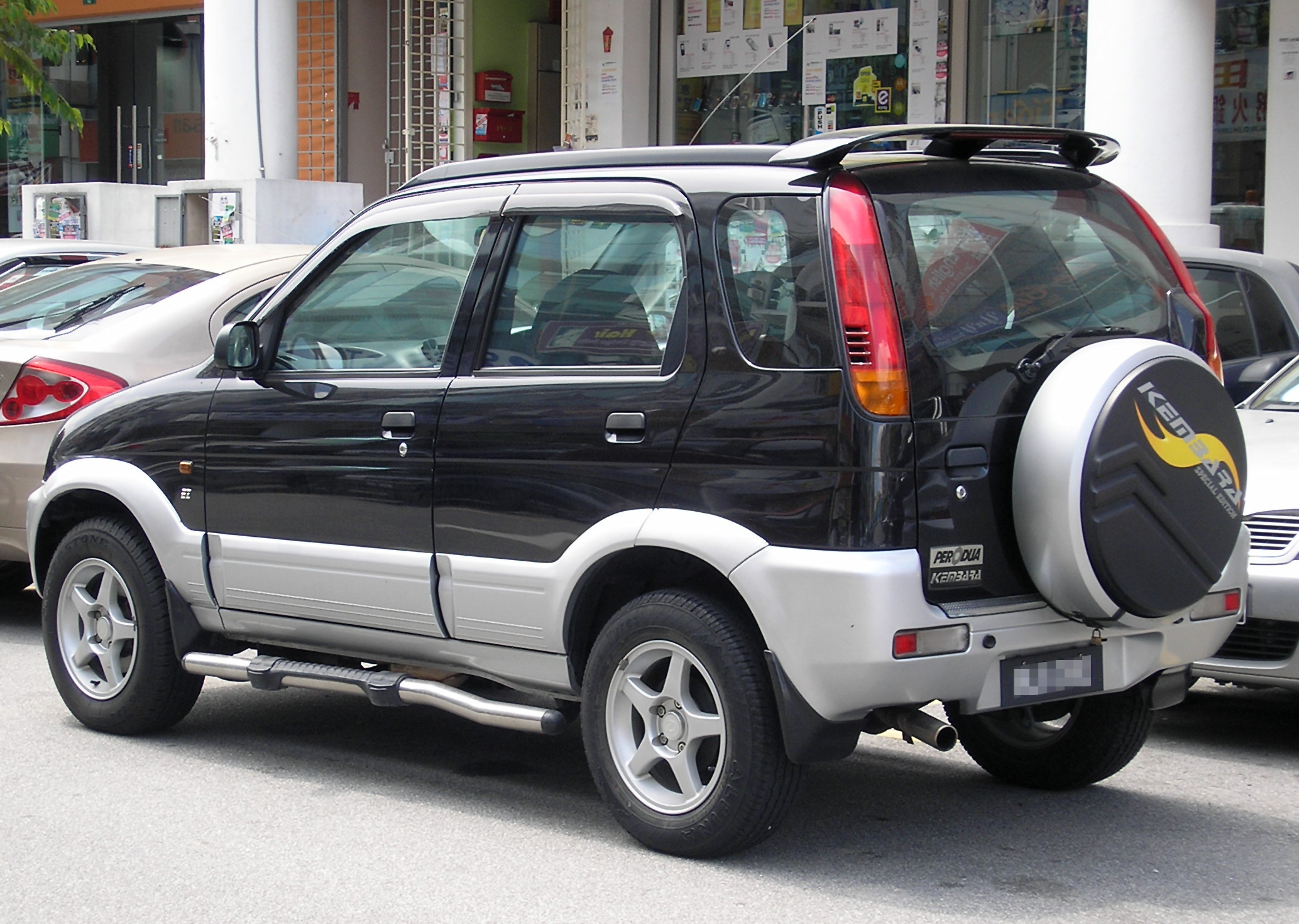
Perodua Kembara (pre-facelift, Malaysia)

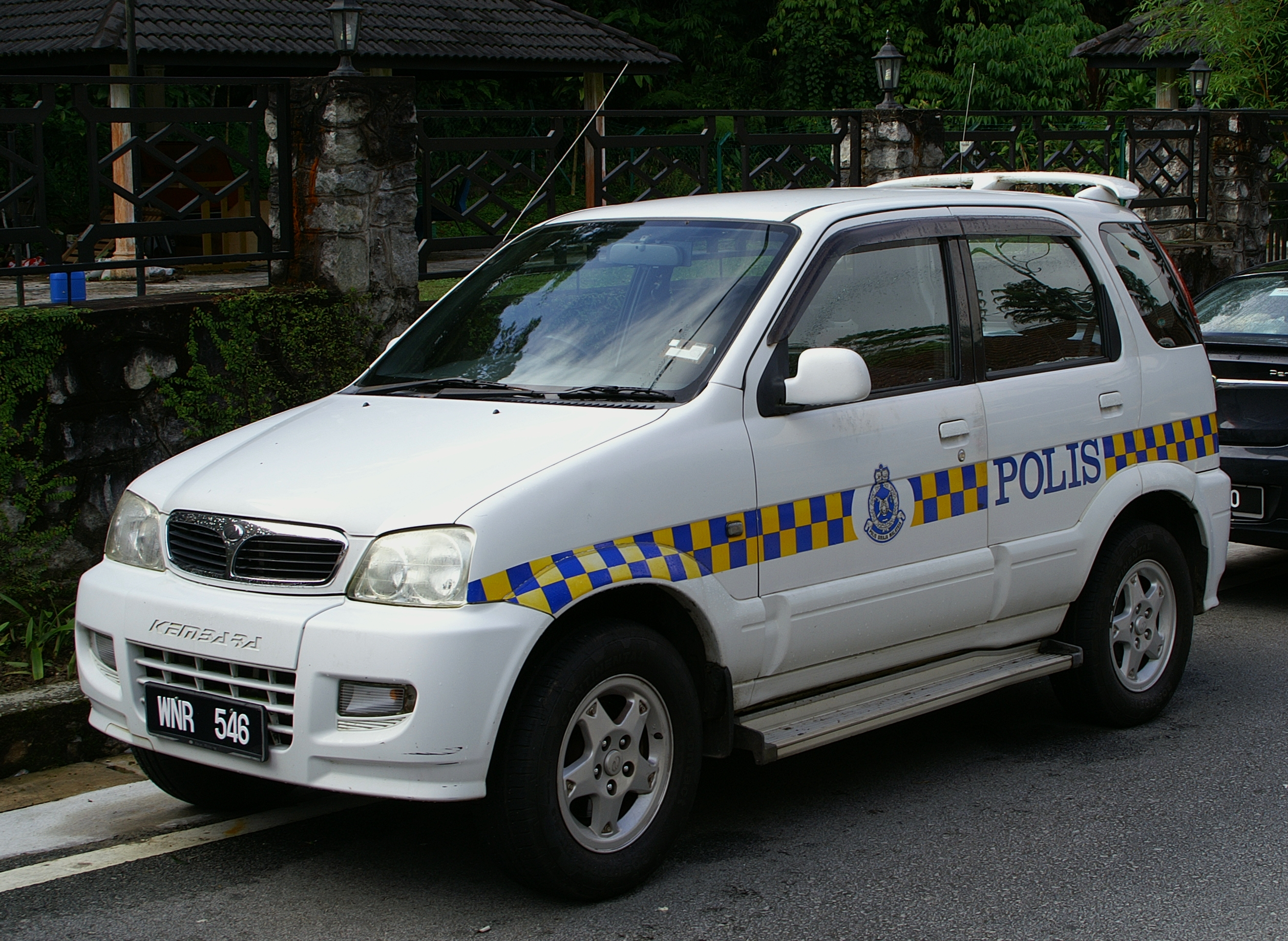
Perodua Kembara (facelift, Malaysia)

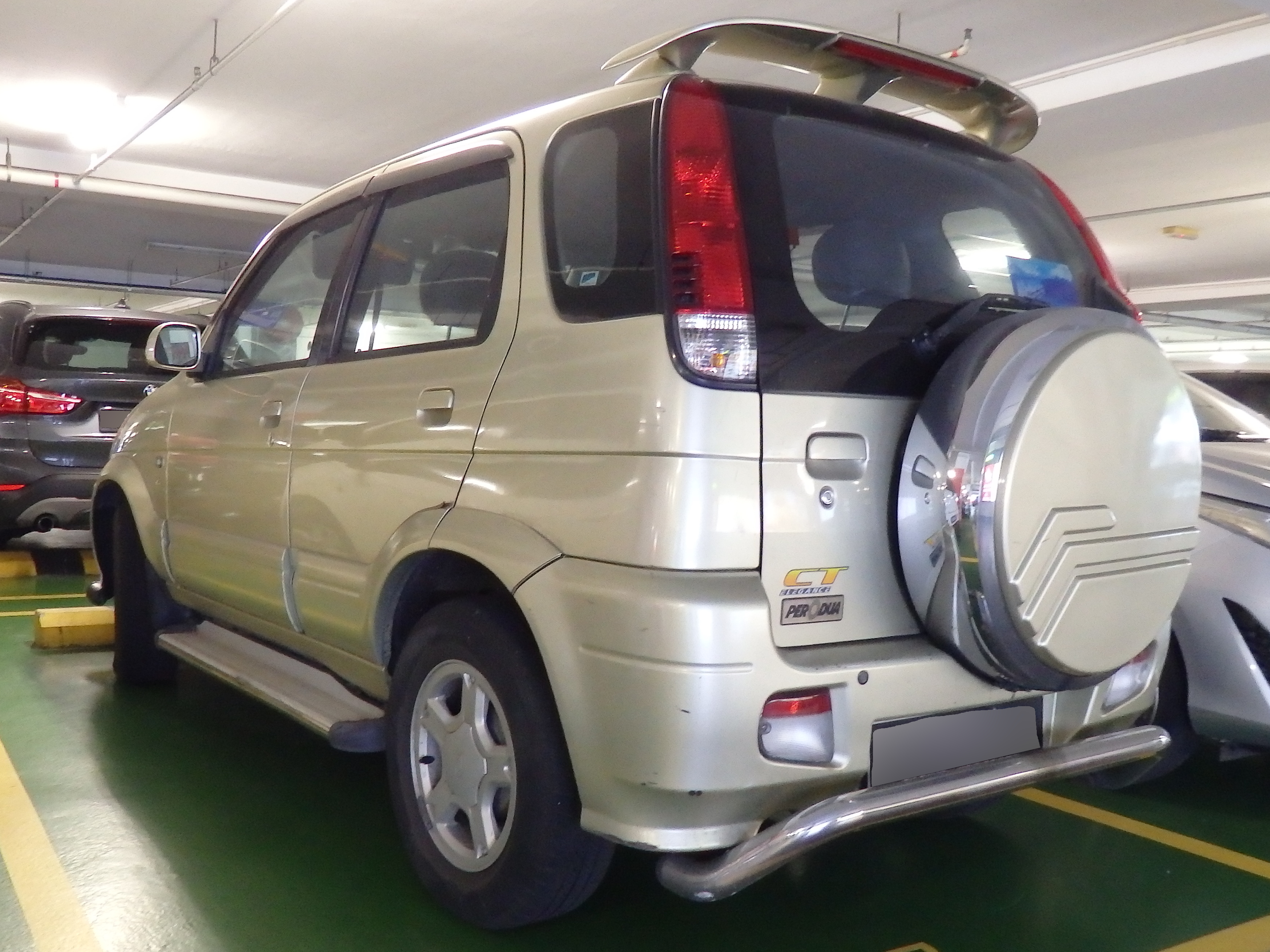
Perodua Kembara (facelift, Malaysia)

==== Indonesia ====
In Indonesia, Astra Daihatsu Motor (ADM) produced and marketed a version of the first-generation Terios called the Daihatsu Taruna, featuring a different exterior styling and an extended rear end with a capability of third-row seats. The name Taruna was taken from the Palinese word of the same name, which means 'young'.

First introduced on 1 July 1999, the Taruna was initially available as a short-wheelbase configuration, the C-series, with the internal code F500. The C-series use dual-side facing seats for its third-row, utilizing a 5+2 seating layout (promotionally as 5++). Its initial engine was a 1.6-litre HD-C petrol engine with carburetor, which was also used in the locally assembled F70 series Feroza and Daihatsu Zebra Espass. Initial grades include the CL, CX and CSX. The CSR grade, which positioned above the CSX grade, was added in April 2000, featuring a fuel-injected 1.6-litre HD-E petrol engine. Between 1999 and 2000, two limited edition variants based on the CSX grade were offered, including the CSX Limited (1999–2000, only available in a two-tone light grey color) and G Limited (2000, only available in a two-tone gold-and-brown color).

In August 2001, Daihatsu introduced a long-wheelbase option, the F-series, with the internal code F520. The Taruna F-series was originally previewed by the TX-F concept at 2000 Gaikindo Auto Expo. Unlike the C-series, the F-series utilize a seven-seat layout with front-facing third-row seats. Grades for the F-series include the FL, FX, FGX and FGZ. At the same time, the C-series received a new fuel-injected 1.5-litre HE-E petrol engine, replacing the previous HD-C engine. However, Daihatsu continues to offer the HD-C engine for a short period of time in the F-series, before later switching to the HE-E engine in the same year. The FGZ grade uses the same HD-E engine as the CSR grade. All grades except CL/FL received multi-reflector halogen headlights. The HD-E engine option, together with the CSR and FGZ grades, was discontinued in 2002.

Minor facelift were introduced in July 2003, featuring a H-shaped grille, updated five-spoke wheel design for the CX/FX and CSX/FGX grades, a rear wheel-only spare tire cover, and a pattern-style interior upholstery. This facelift was launched at the 2003 Gaikindo Auto Expo.

Another update was introduced in March 2004. The grille was updated into a vertical design, featuring an enlarged 'D' symbol emblem to match with the one found in the then-new Xenia. The dual-side facing third-row seats option was removed from the C-series, resulting short-wheelbase models were only sold as five-seaters. The CL/FL grades received multi-reflector halogen headlights as the 2003 upper grade models.

The Taruna received a facelift in March 2005, featuring a new grille design with a larger and bolder chrome 'D' symbol emblem to match with recent Daihatsu models at the time, as well updated taillights. The CX/FX and CSX/FGX grades received new bumper designs, while the CL/FL grades retained the pre-facelift bumpers. The CX/FX and CSX/FGX grades also feature new 16-inch five-spoke alloy wheels and side mouldings, while the CSX/FGX gained an updated rear spoiler design. The rear spare tire cover was reverted to a full cover as the earlier 1999–2003 models, with an updated design. Daihatsu marketed the facelifted model as the Taruna Oxxy (stylized as Taruna OXXY).

Production of the Taruna ended in late 2006, where it was replaced by the F700 series using the global Terios nameplate about a month later.

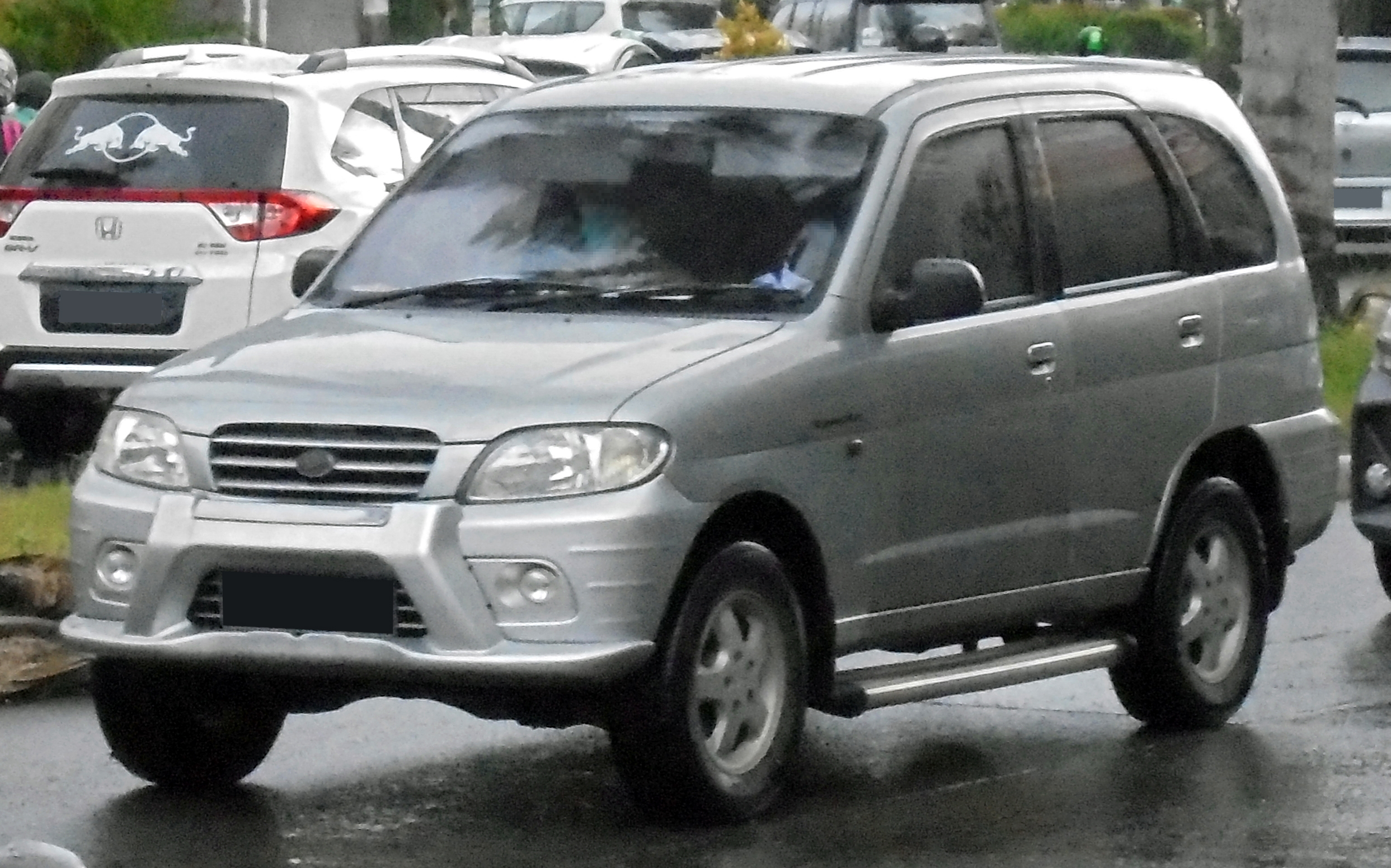
2002 Daihatsu Taruna CX (SWB, Indonesia)

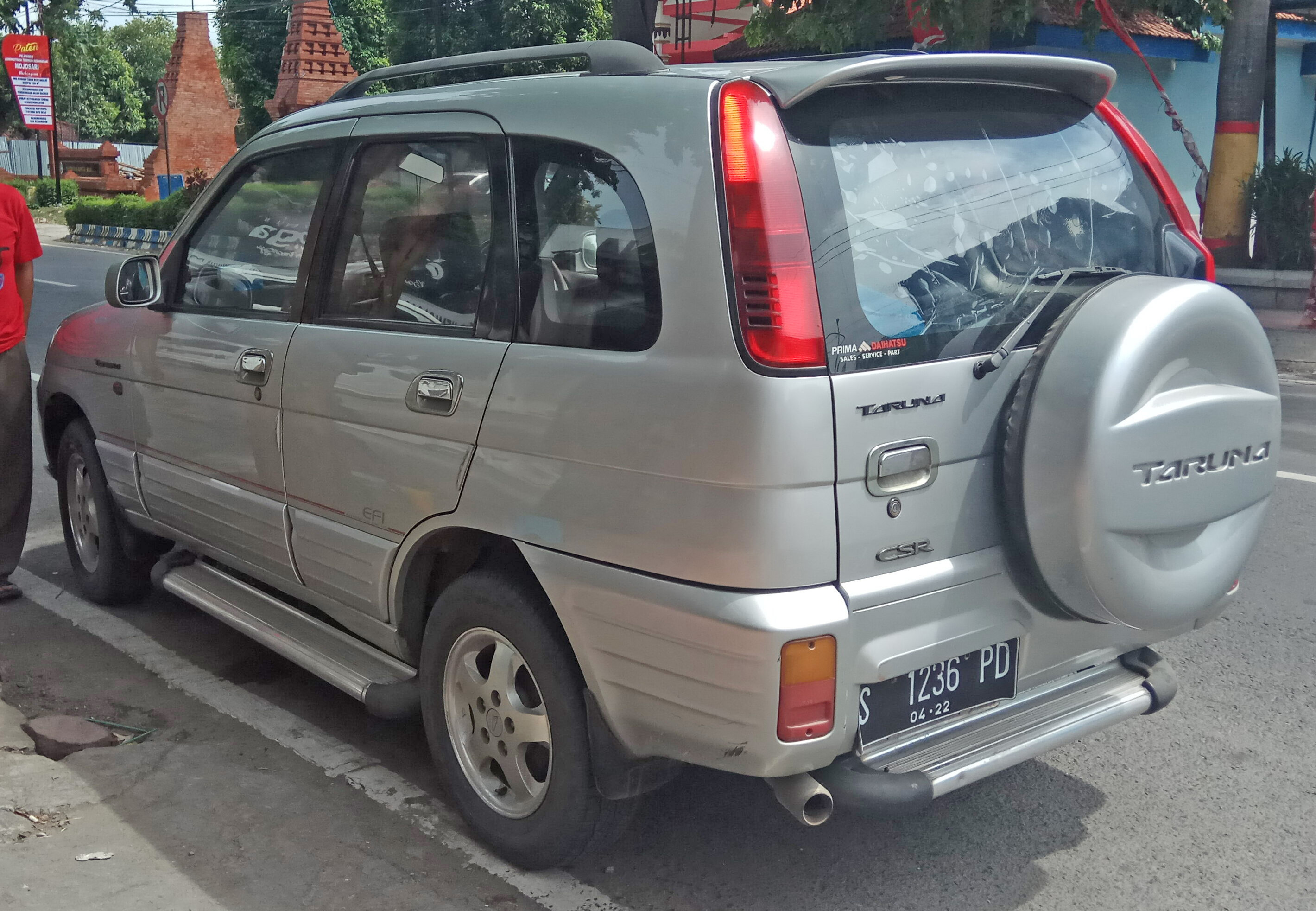
2001 Daihatsu Taruna CSR (SWB, Indonesia)

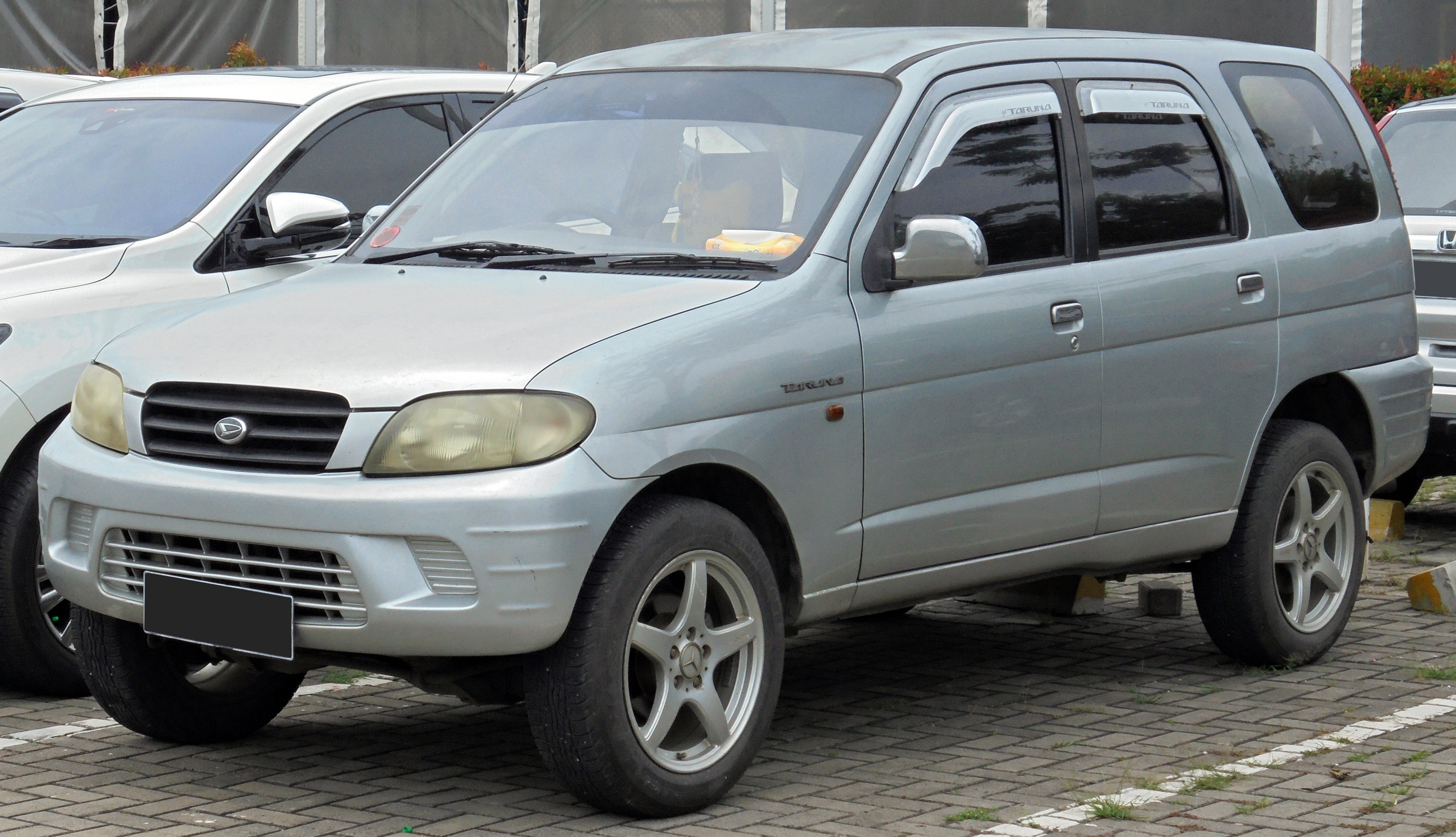
2001–2003 Daihatsu Taruna FL (LWB, Indonesia)

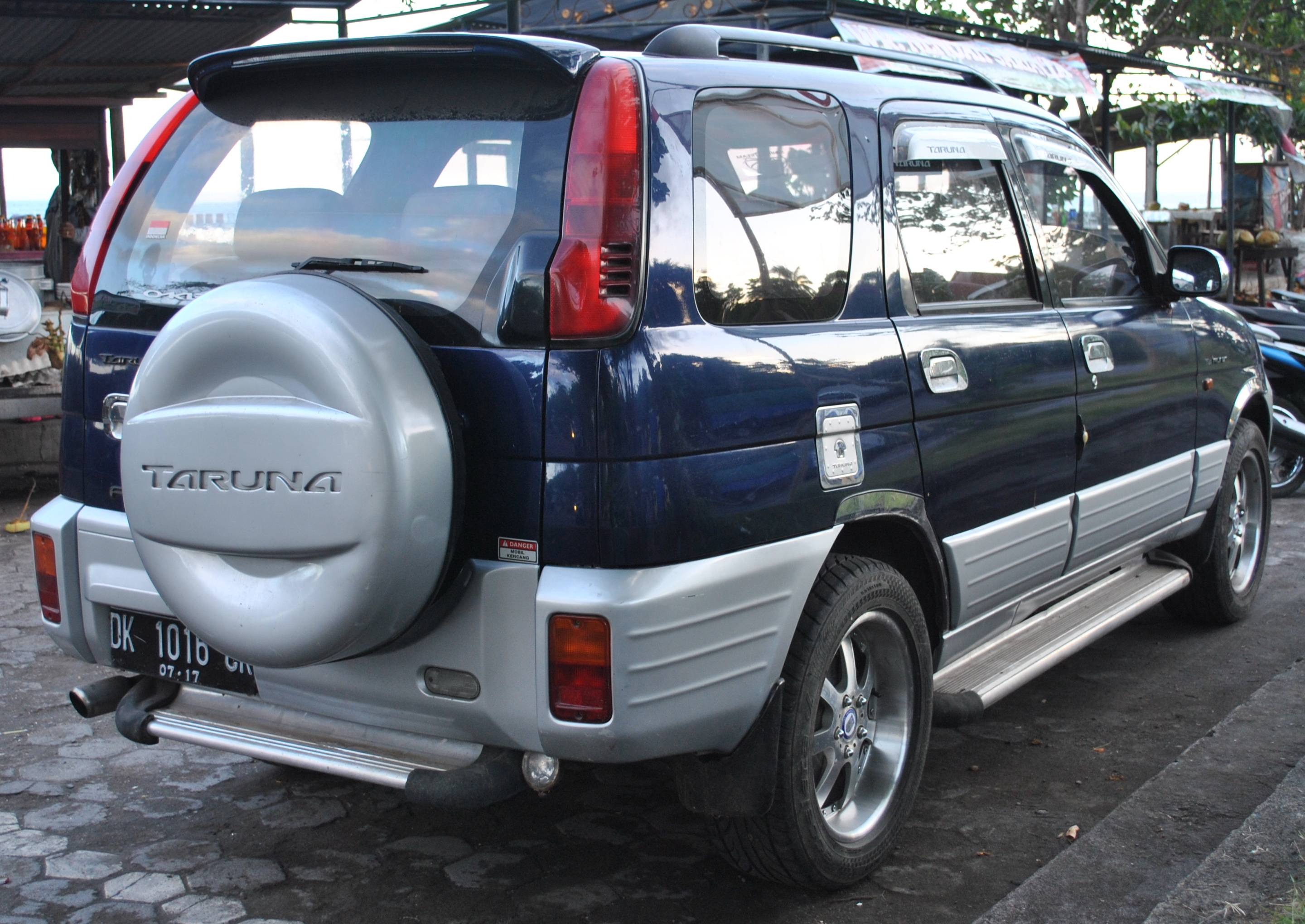
2001–2003 Daihatsu Taruna FGX (LWB, Indonesia)

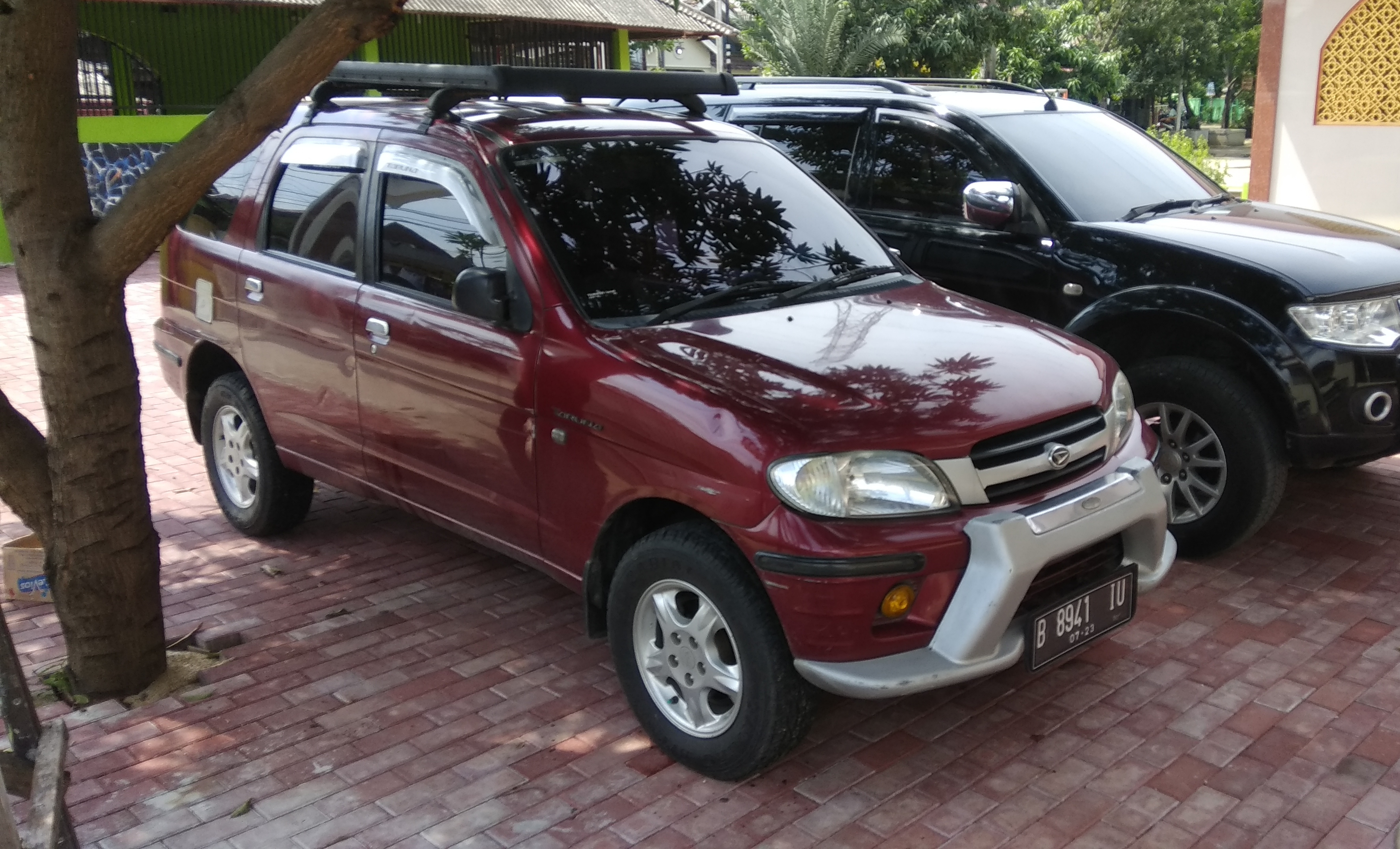
2003–2004 Daihatsu Taruna FX (LWB, Indonesia)

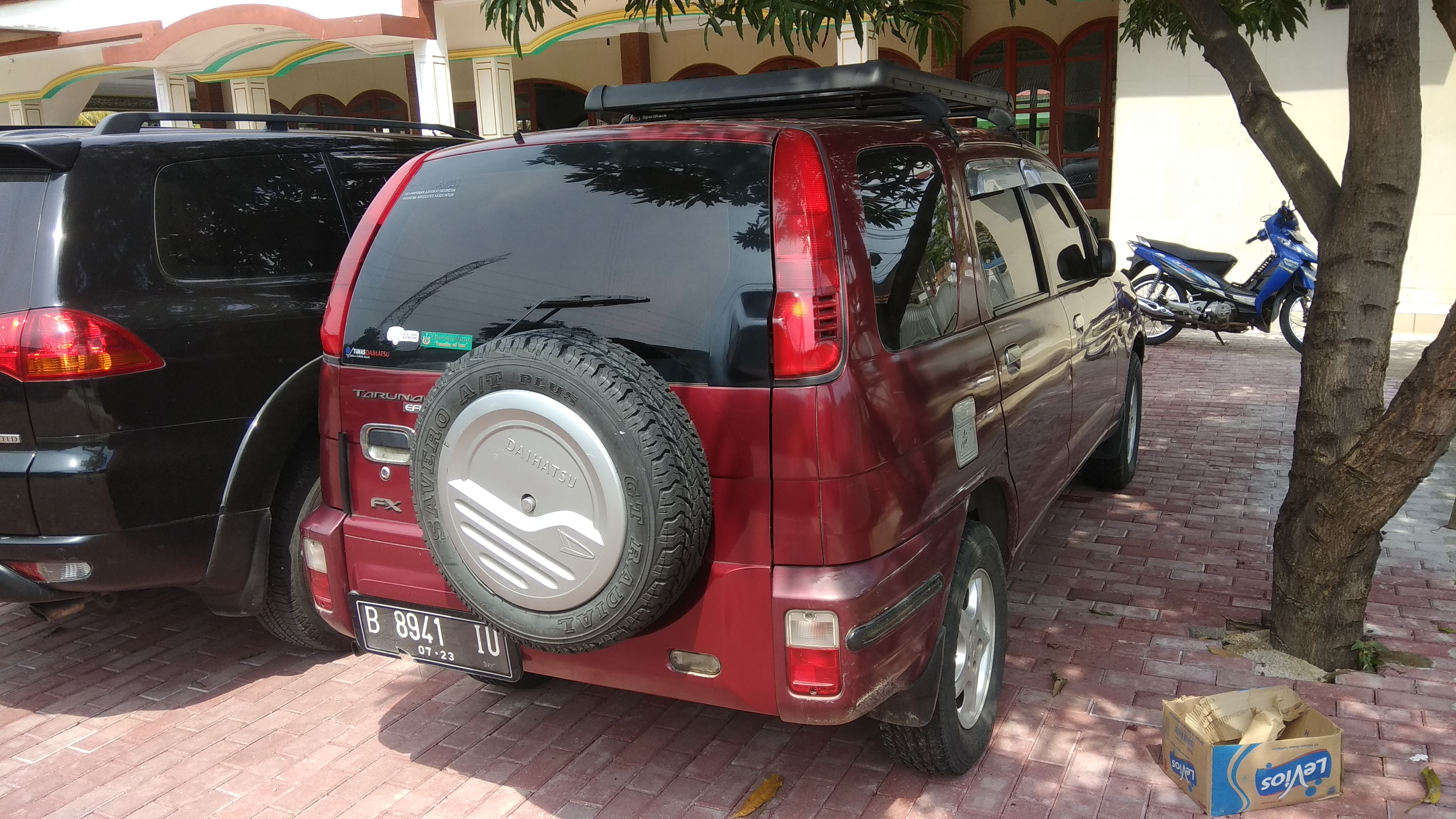
2003–2004 Daihatsu Taruna FX (LWB, Indonesia)

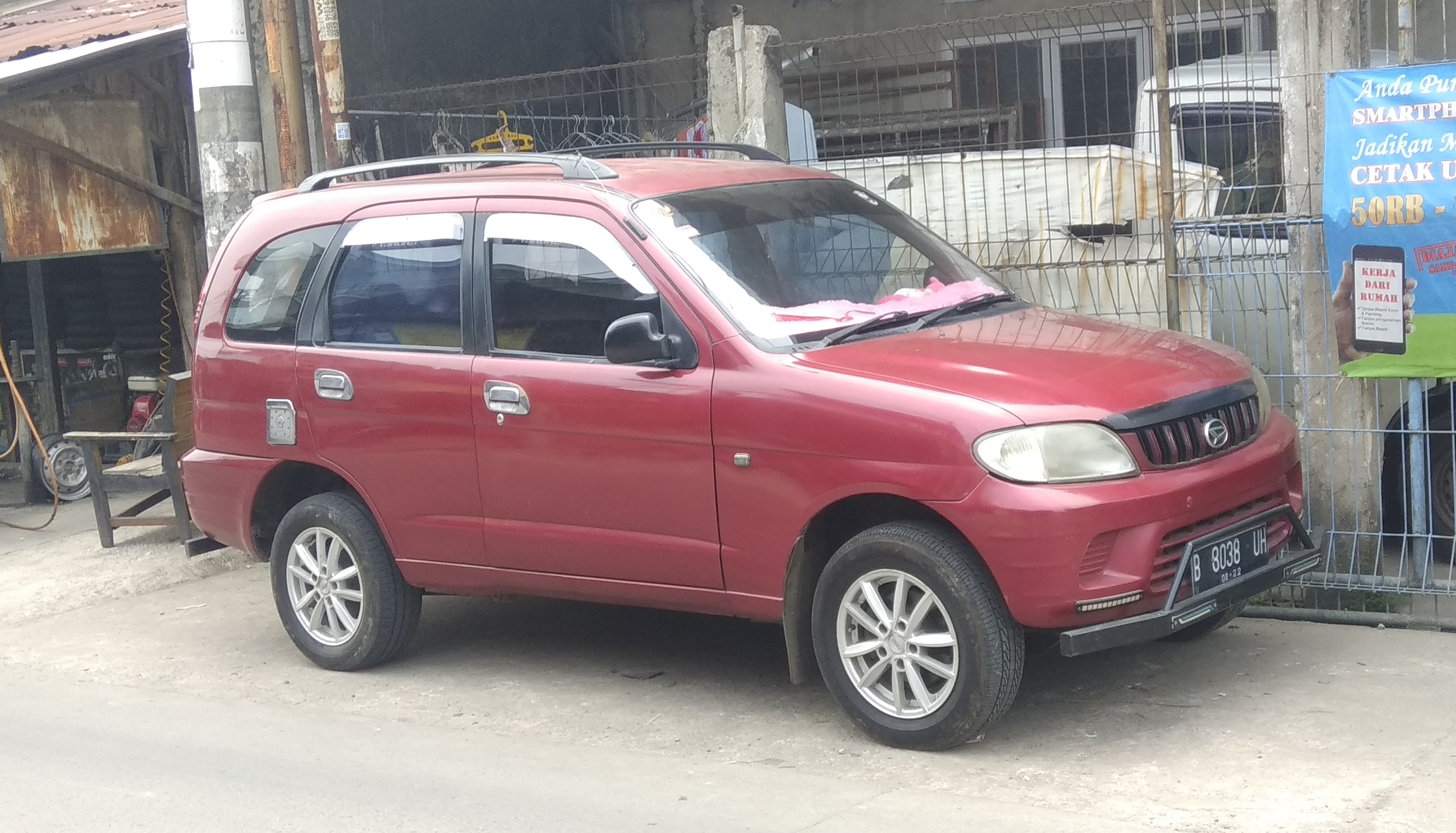
2004–2005 Daihatsu Taruna CX (SWB, Indonesia)

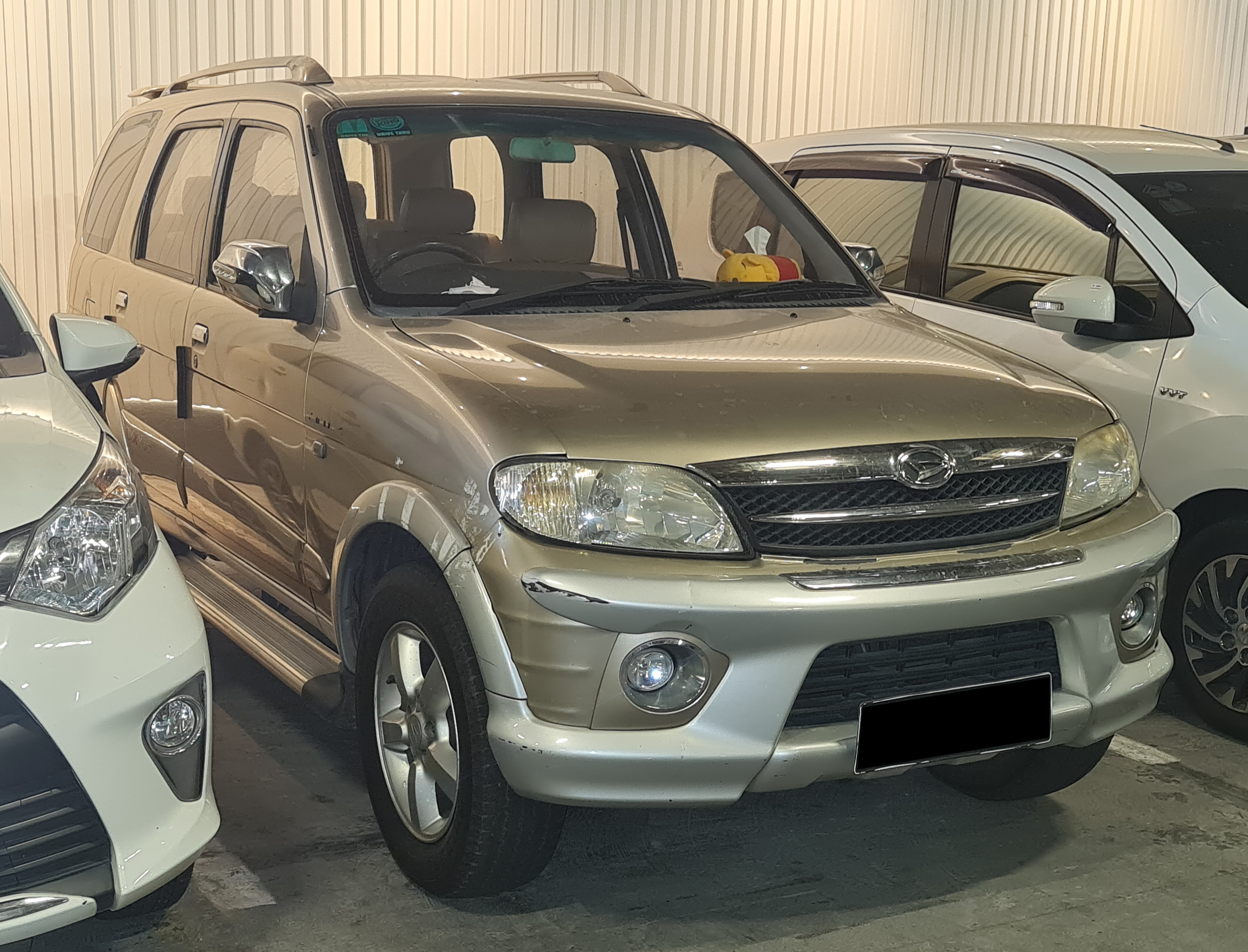
2006 Daihatsu Taruna Oxxy FGX (LWB, Indonesia)

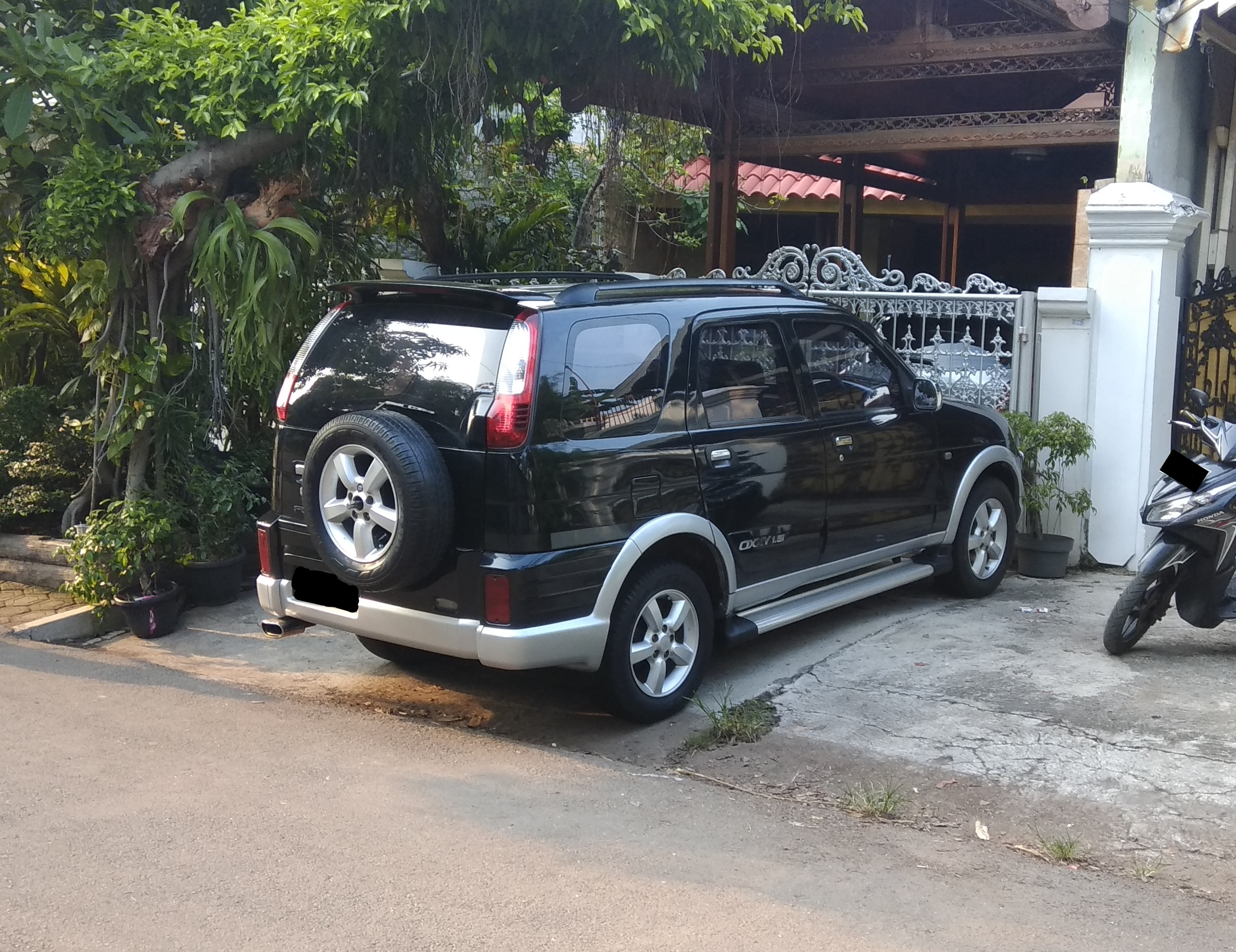
2005–2006 Daihatsu Taruna Oxxy FGX (LWB, Indonesia)

==== China ====
In China, the Terios was produced under two different brand names: as the Zotye 2008/Hunter and 5008 powered with a 1.5-litre engine from Mitsubishi Motors (first series body); Zotye started production of the Terios using decommissioned toolings bought from Taiwan, which caused some controversy, while FAW badged the Terios as the Dario Terios. In 2009, Daihatsu withdrew from the China market due to bad performance and sold the tooling and rights of this car to First Auto Works (FAW), who was their official joint venture partner in China. Production for the 2008 ran from 2005 to 2010, while the 5008 was produced from 2008 to 2013.

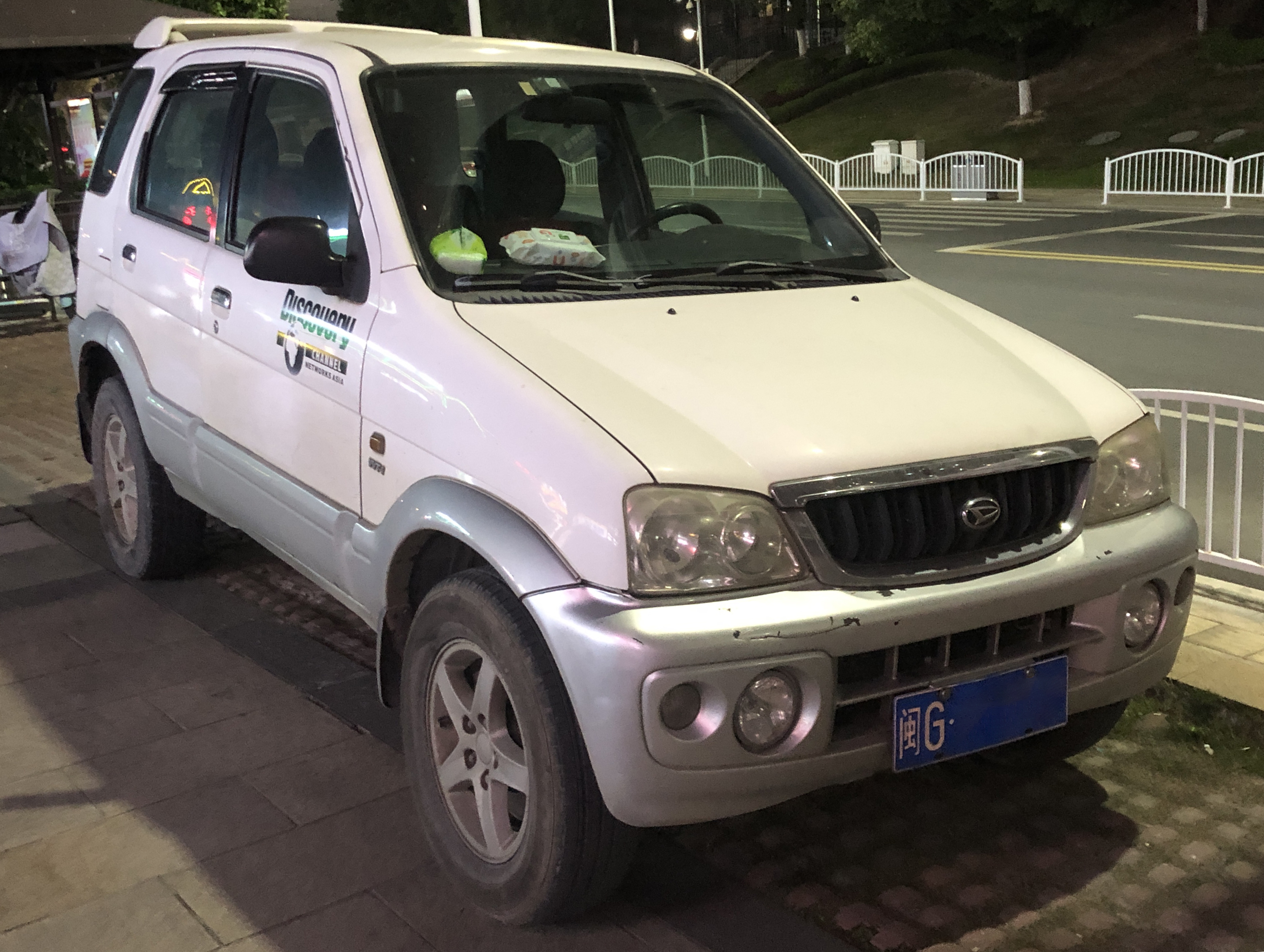
Huali Dario Terios (China)

== Second generation (J200/F700; 2006) ==
Second generation
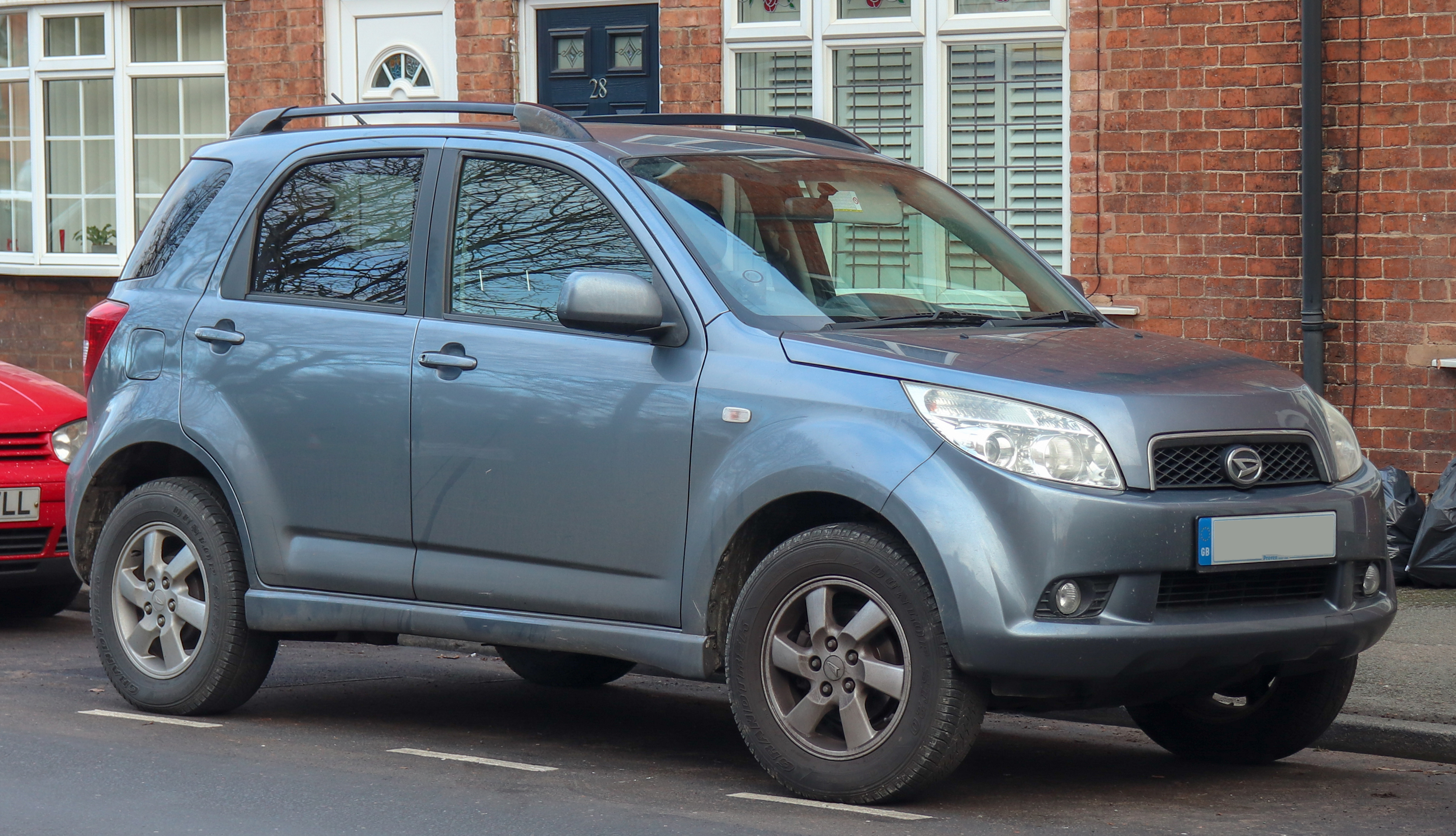
- 2008 Daihatsu Terios SE (J200RG; pre-facelift, UK)

Overview
- Model code: J200 (short-wheelbase); F700 (long-wheelbase)
- Also called: Daihatsu Be‣go (Japan); Toyota Rush; Perodua Nautica (Malaysia)
- Production: January 2006 – March 2016 (Japan); December 2006 – October 2017 (Indonesia); 2006–2017 (international); 2008–2009 (Nautica)
- Assembly: Japan: Ikeda, Osaka (Ikeda plant); Nakatsu, Ōita (Daihatsu Auto Body/Daihatsu Motor Kyushu); Indonesia: Sunter, North Jakarta (ADM)
- Designer: Hirofumi Wada, Yoshihisa Okuno and Chung Inyeok (pre-facelift); Mark Widjaja (2008 and 2015 facelifts); Akbar Juniarto (Rush TRD Sportivo – 2015 facelift)

Body and chassis
- Class: Mini SUV; Compact SUV
- Layout: Front-engine, rear-wheel-drive; Front-engine, four-wheel-drive
- Chassis: Unibody
- Related: Daihatsu Xenia (F600) (F700 model)

Powertrain
- Engine: Petrol: 1.3 L K3-VE I4; 1.5 L 3SZ-VE I4
- Power output: 68 kW (91 hp; 92 PS) (K3-VE); 80 kW (107 hp; 109 PS) (3SZ-VE)
- Transmission: 5-speed manual; 4-speed automatic

Dimensions
- Wheelbase: 2,580 mm (101.6 in) (J200); 2,685 mm (105.7 in) (F700)
- Length: 3,995–4,005 mm (157.3–157.7 in) (J200); 4,370–4,420 mm (172.0–174.0 in) (F700)
- Width: 1,695 mm (66.7 in) (J200); 1,695–1,745 mm (66.7–68.7 in) (F700)
- Height: 1,690–1,705 mm (66.5–67.1 in) (J200); 1,695–1,740 mm (66.7–68.5 in) (F700)
- Kerb weight: 1,150–1,200 kg (2,535–2,646 lb) (J200); 1,135–1,235 kg (2,502–2,723 lb) (F700)

Chronology
- Successor: Daihatsu Rocky (A200) (Japan, Be‣go); Toyota Raize (Japan, J200 series Rush); Perodua Ativa (Malaysia, Nautica)

The concept model called D-Compact 4x4 made an appearance in September 2005 at the 61st Frankfurt Motor Show and in November 2005 at the 39th Tokyo Motor Show before being named to Terios, which went into production in January 2006. The model codes are J200, J210 and J211 for the short-wheelbase configuration which has a 5-seater configuration; F700 and F710 for the long-wheelbase configuration that was built to accommodate the 7-seater configuration. It is built on a "built-in ladder frame" monocoque body, which is claimed to "achieve balance between lighter weight, higher body rigidity, and comfort".

In European, Central & South American and most other Asian markets, the model is sold under the name Terios. Daihatsu designed and manufacture the Terios and also supplies the vehicle to Toyota as the Toyota Rush (Japanese: トヨタ・ラッシュ, Hepburn: Toyota Rasshu) under a consigned/OEM manufacturing agreement. According to the company, the name "Rush" is inspired from a "sense of energetic vitality and cheerfulness".

=== Markets ===
==== Japan ====
For the Japanese market, the first-generation Terios was succeeded by the Daihatsu Be‣go (Japanese: ダイハツ・ビーゴ, Hepburn: Daihatsu Bīgo) and the first-generation Toyota Rush. Both vehicles were announced on 17 January 2006. According to Daihatsu, the name "Be‣go" was derived from the combination of "being" and "going" words. The Rush was an exclusive model to the Toyopet Store dealership network.

Both use either 1.3-litre or 1.5-litre engine. Only the 1.5-litre variant is available with both two- or four-wheel drive. The vehicle has a permanent 4WD system via lockable central differential. However, it lacks low ratio gears.

A minor refresh of the Be‣go and Rush was unveiled on 13 November 2008 in Japan. The minor facelift brought redesigned front bumper, tail lamps, alloy wheel design for the G grade and a 5% improvement for fuel economy for the 2WD automatic model. The Be‣go and Rush were discontinued in March 2016 and succeeded by the A200 series Rocky/Toyota Raize crossover in November 2019.

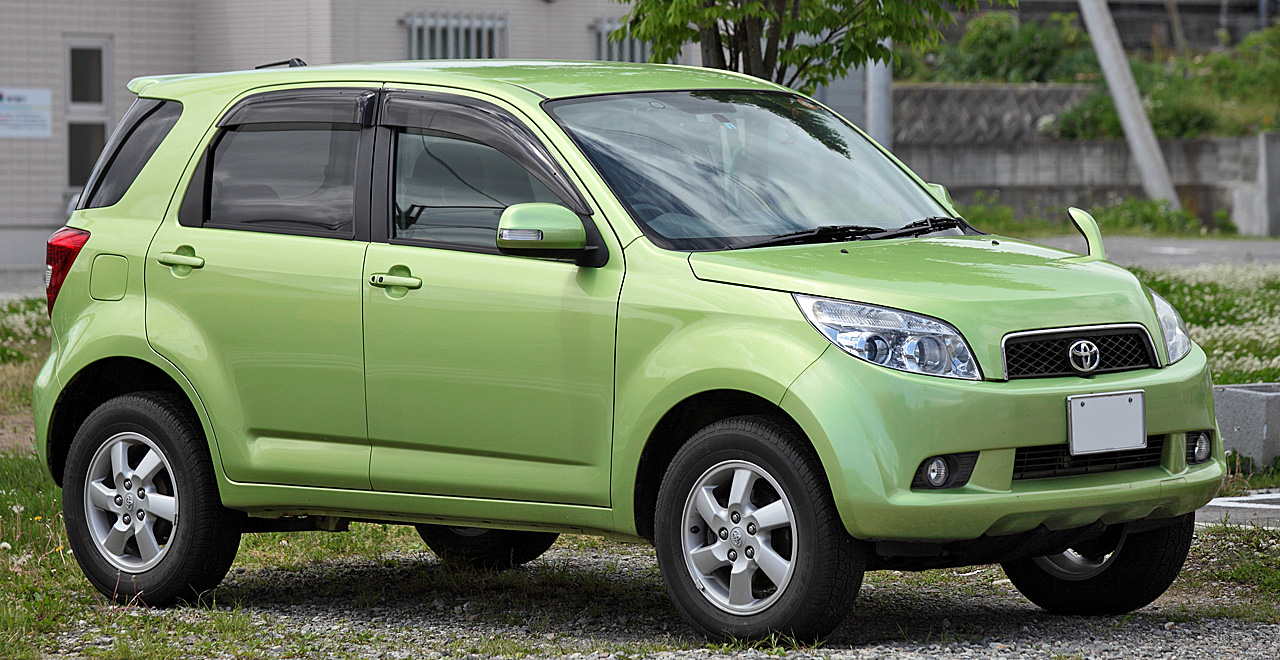
Toyota Rush (J200E; pre-facelift, Japan)

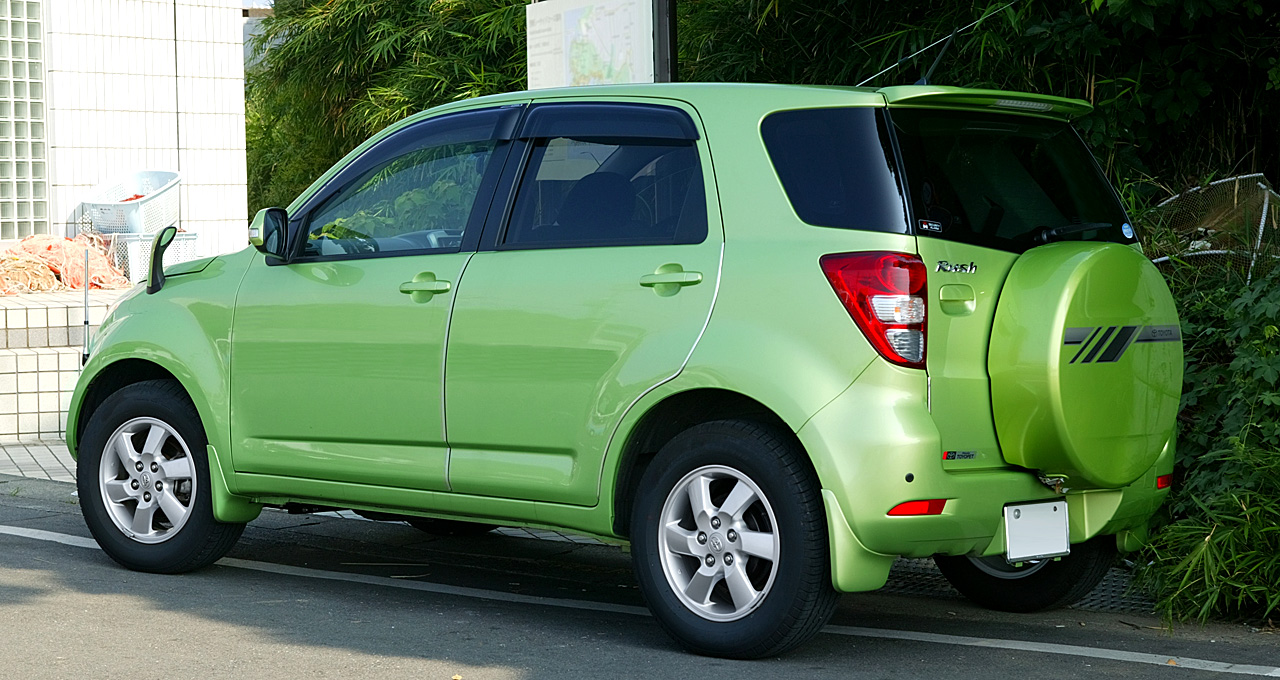
Toyota Rush (J200E; pre-facelift, Japan)

==== Indonesia ====
The second-generation Terios and first-generation Rush were both launched in Indonesia on 14 December 2006, with the former succeeded the Taruna. Sale starts in January 2007, both cars were sold in long-wheelbase configuration and rear-wheel drive layout only. Three-row seating were standard on the Terios and optional on the Rush. The Terios was initially offered in TS and TX grades with optionals such as TS Deluxe, TS Extra, TX Deluxe, TX Elegant and TX Adventure, while the Rush came with G and S grades. The Terios and Rush have different wheel options, where the Terios TS uses 16-inch steel wheel with cover and the Terios TX uses a six-spoke alloy wheel with similar size, meanwhile both Rush G and S uses similar five-spoke alloy wheel. The main difference between the appearance of Terios and Rush is the use of over fender in the Rush as default. The Terios is not equipped as default, yet has a different model of over fender and available as a part of the optional TX Adventure grade and an optional Genuine Accessories. Safety features such as Immobilizer, rear Defogger, ABS, EBD and dual SRS Airbags are exclusive to the Rush.

Onwards, the Rush received minor updates such as fender mirror and 2-bar chrome grille ornament in September 2008, and the Terios also received a standard body-colored side body mouldings as well as the Genuine Accessories standard side visors on the same year, starting from TX Deluxe grade. On the Rush, front and rear bumper guards, foglamp covers with chrome outer ring, and new chrome grille ornament replacing the previous starting from August 2009 minor update, when the Rush also received standard body-colored side body mouldings and chrome electric mirror covers. On 18 January 2010, the TS grade received an automatic transmission variant, while Toyota also launch the automatic one for the Rush G grade on the next day. Since January 2010, the TX Elegant option was removed and the front grille ornament, foglamp covers, and front bumper guard from the TX Elegant remains as standard for TX Deluxe grade (exclude for TX Adventure).

The Terios and Rush received their first facelift on 5 and 6 October 2010 respectively, both with new bumpers, new tail lights, and new front grille which similar to the facelifted J200 model earlier on 2008. Other updates are new rims, new center panel, new steering wheel, new shifting knob (as installed on the F650 series Avanza and Xenia), new meter cluster with silver outer ring, and new fabric seat pattern. Safety features remains same with Terios still not equipped with it. The S grade of Rush was later replaced by TRD Sportivo grade on 29 August 2013. At the same time, the Terios received several updates such as over fender as standard for TX grade with front and rear bodykits, new spare tire cover design, new rims with 235/60 R16 tire (TX), and for the first time equipped with ABS and dual airbags along with 3rd row seatbelts. The 2013 update shifts the interior color previously from ivory into black.

On 20 March 2015, both the Terios and Rush received their second facelift, consisted of projector headlamps with LED positioning lamps, LED tail lights, rear short-pole antenna, wider grille with a chrome lower bar, full-width air intake for the lower bumper, and blacked-out centre piece. The steering wheel was updated to the one used in F650 series Xenia/Avanza. The grade levels for Terios were renamed to X, X Extra, R and R Adventure. On 18 February 2016, the R Custom grade was added for the Terios, followed by TRD Sportivo Ultimo grade (with TRD suspension kits) for the Rush on 26 February. Three-row seating became standard on both TRD Sportivo grades. At The 25th Gaikindo Indonesia International Auto Show held in 2017, Daihatsu release a limited to 20 units of Terios with copper accents and 110 Edition badge as a part of celebrating 110 years of the brand along with other limited models (Xenia, Luxio, Sigra, Darion).

==== Singapore ====
In Singapore, the Terios is offered by the local distributor in both short (J210)- and long-wheelbase (F710) configurations with an 1.5-litre engine and as a 4WD as standard.

==== Malaysia ====
In Malaysia, the second-generation Terios is available as the Toyota Rush (2008 to 2017) and Perodua Nautica (2008 to 2009). The Rush was introduced in January 2008 as a long-wheelbase model. Imported from Indonesia, it offers three-row seating as standard. The Nautica was introduced in April 2008 as a rebadged model of the short-wheelbase Terios/Rush. Available with standard four-wheel drive, it was imported from Japan as the replacement to the Perodua Kembara.

===== Toyota Rush =====
The first-generation Rush was launched in Malaysia in January 2008. It is available in two grade levels: 1.5G (with either manual or automatic transmission) and 1.5S (with automatic transmission only). It was only sold as the long-wheelbase configuration.

In December 2010, the Rush received its first facelift for 2011.

In April 2015, the Rush received its second facelift with the same model in the Indonesian market. Exterior changes included redesigned front bumper, radiator grille and bonnet. The bumper is finished in a two-tone effect, and the grille is finished with faux carbon-fibre. Elsewhere, there is a new integrated chrome lining highlight running across the headlamp and radiator grille, restyled tail lamps with combination LEDs and smoked lenses. The 1.5S has additional equipment including fog lamps, chrome covers for the wing mirrors, and leather steering wheel and gear knob.

===== Perodua Nautica =====
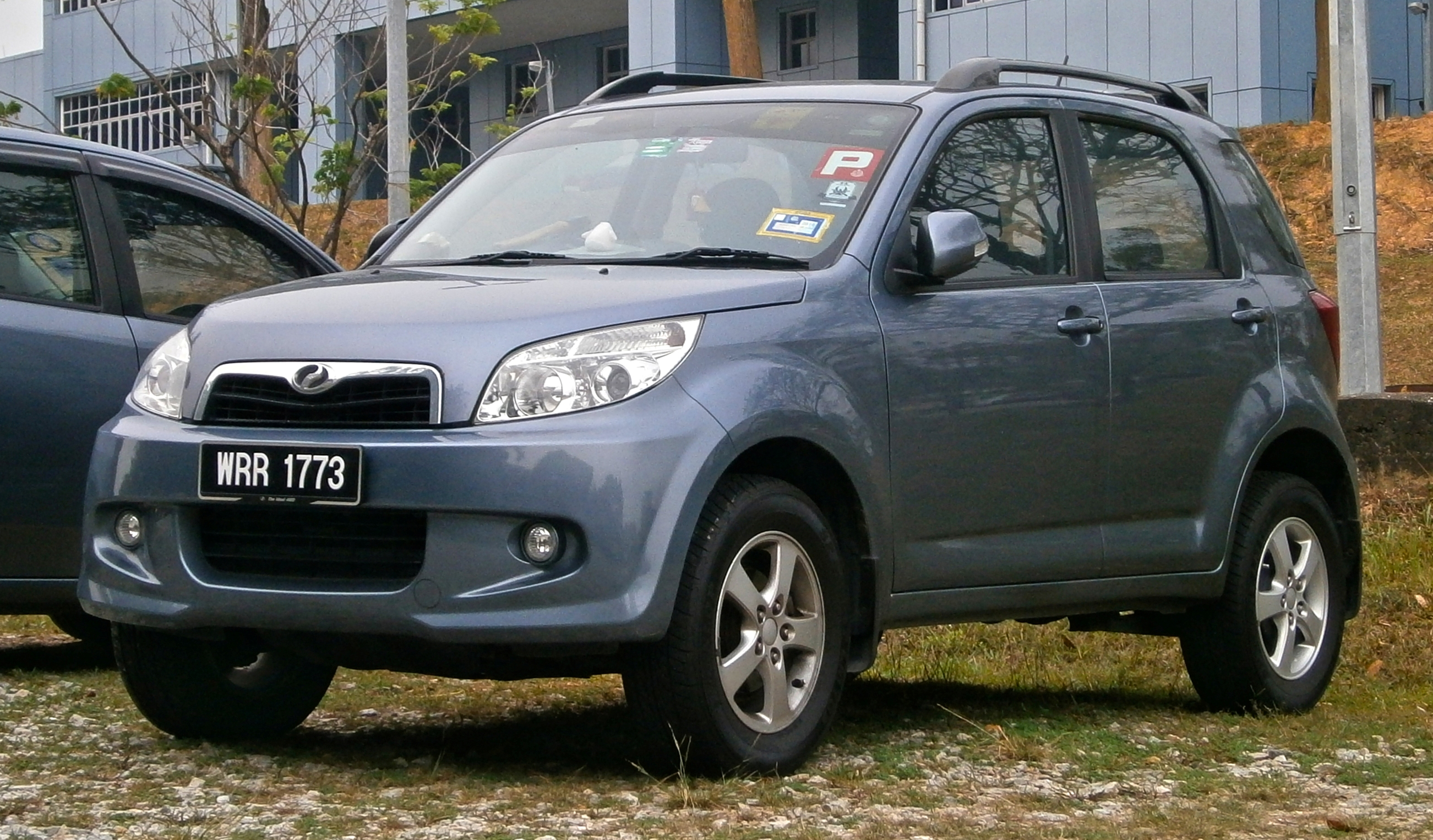
2008 Perodua Nautica

Perodua launched a rebadged version of the short-wheelbase Terios, called Nautica in May 2008. The model was fully imported from Japan, except for the front grille, front bumper and rear bumper which are manufactured and fitted in Malaysia. It has a 1.5-litre DVVT engine, full-time 4WD, projector headlamps, and five seats with dark interior. The price tag of the Nautica is not much different from the long-wheelbase Rush. It comes with only two colour choices: Medallion Grey and Majestic Black and comes in automatic transmission only. The Nautica was quietly discontinued in 2009, slightly less than a year after its launch. Only a mere total of 489 units were ever sold. The reason for the discontinuation was because as a national car company focused on local manufacturing, Perodua was unable to obtain sufficient necessary Approved Permits for vehicle importation, as the Nautica was imported in CBU form from Japan.

==== South America ====
In Chile, the short-wheelbase configuration second-generation Terios was launched in 2006. It was re-branded as the Toyota Rush in August 2016, as Daihatsu left the market.

==== South Africa ====
The second-generation Terios was released in South Africa in 2006 as a short-wheelbase 4x4 and 4x2 model. In 2008, the three-row long-wheelbase model was added to the lineup; this model was imported from Indonesia. Sales ended in 2015 when Daihatsu left the market.

=== Safety ===
ASEAN NCAP test results Toyota Rush (2015)
Test	Points	Stars
Adult occupant:	12.47	4 /5 stars
Child occupant:	82%	4 /5 stars
Safety assist:	NA	

=== Awards ===
In 2006, the Terios won the Red Dot Design Award.

=== Gallery ===
==== Short-wheelbase ====
Daihatsu Terios

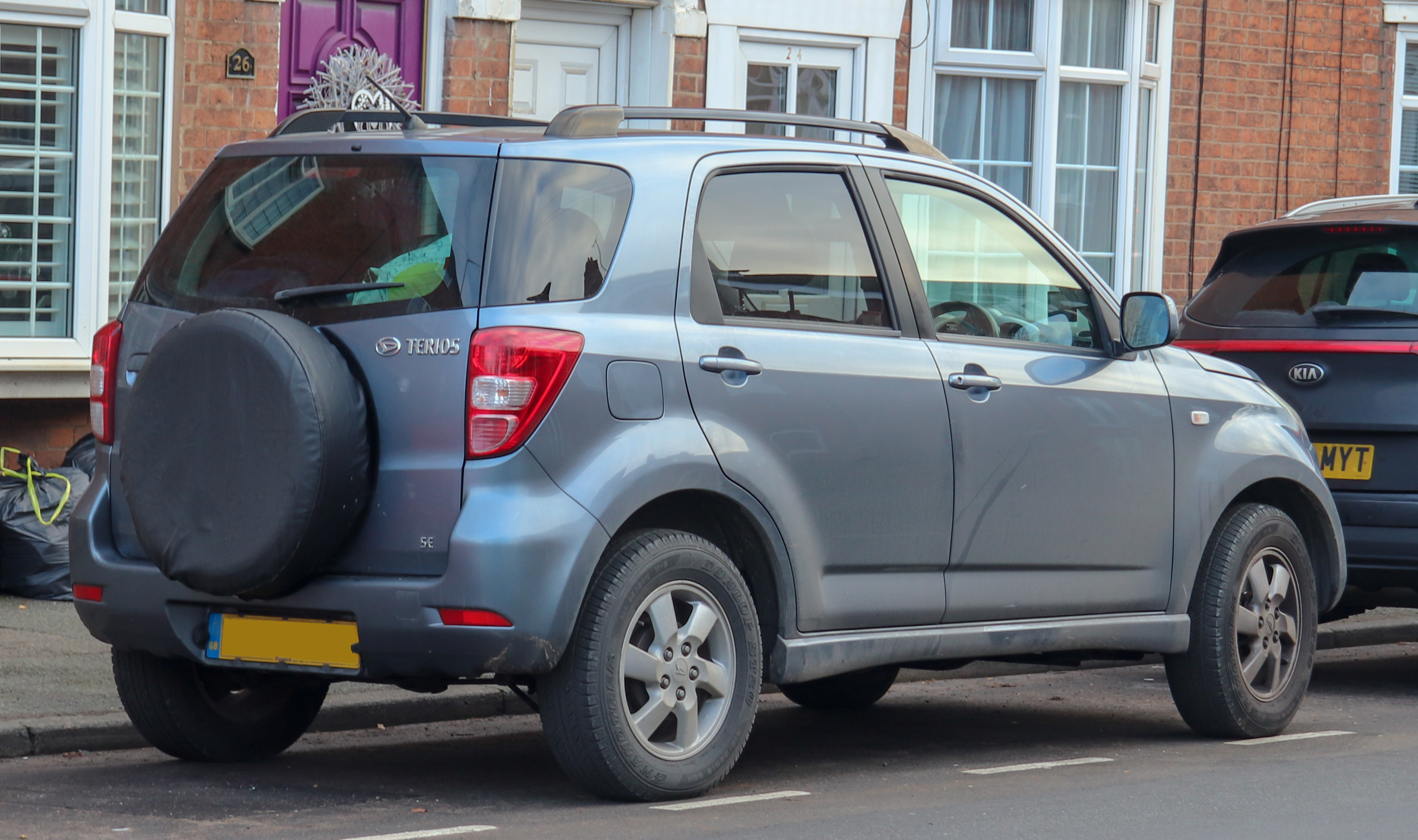
2008 Daihatsu Terios SE (J200RG; pre-facelift, UK)

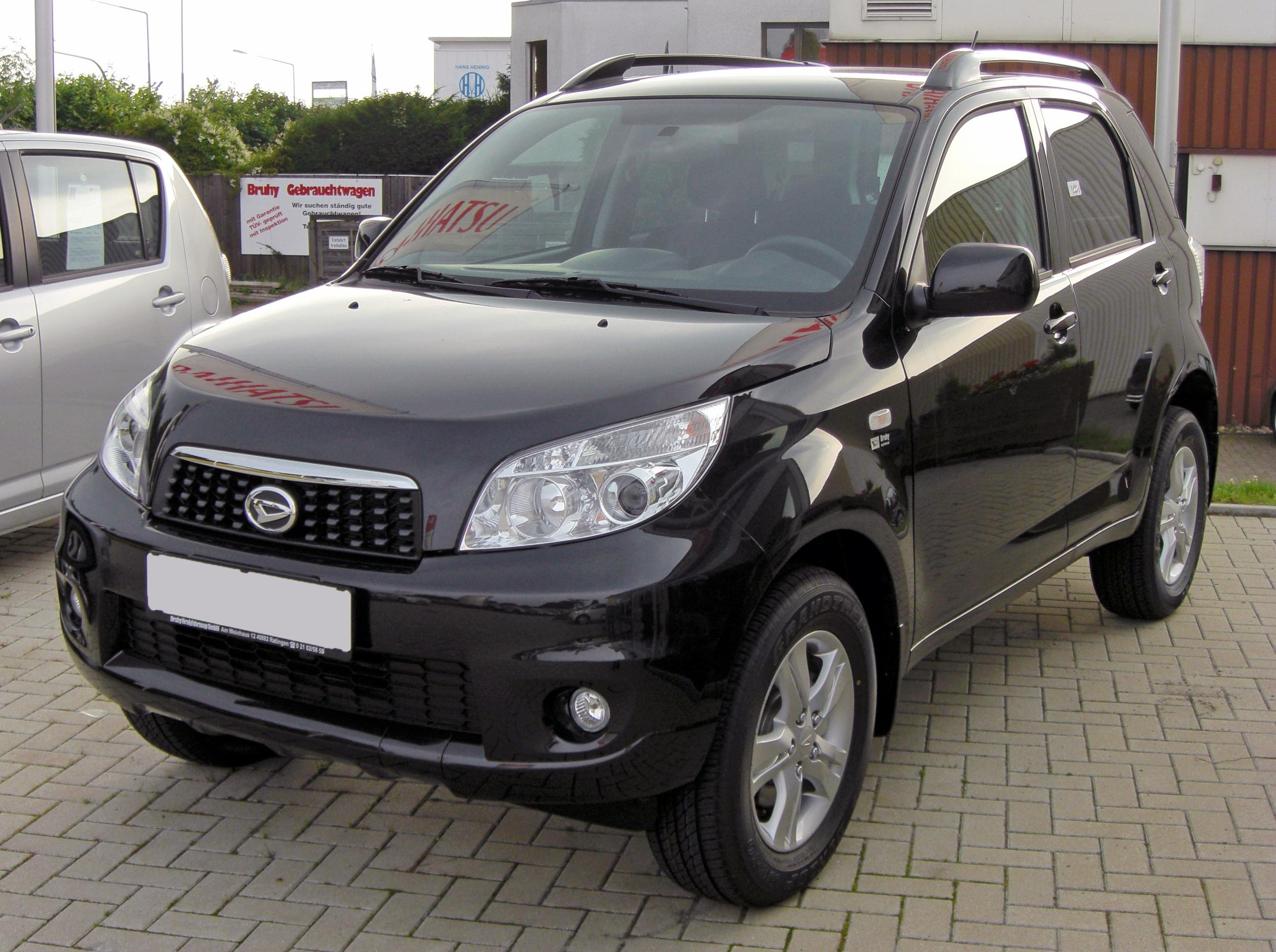
Daihatsu Terios (J200LG; first facelift, Germany)

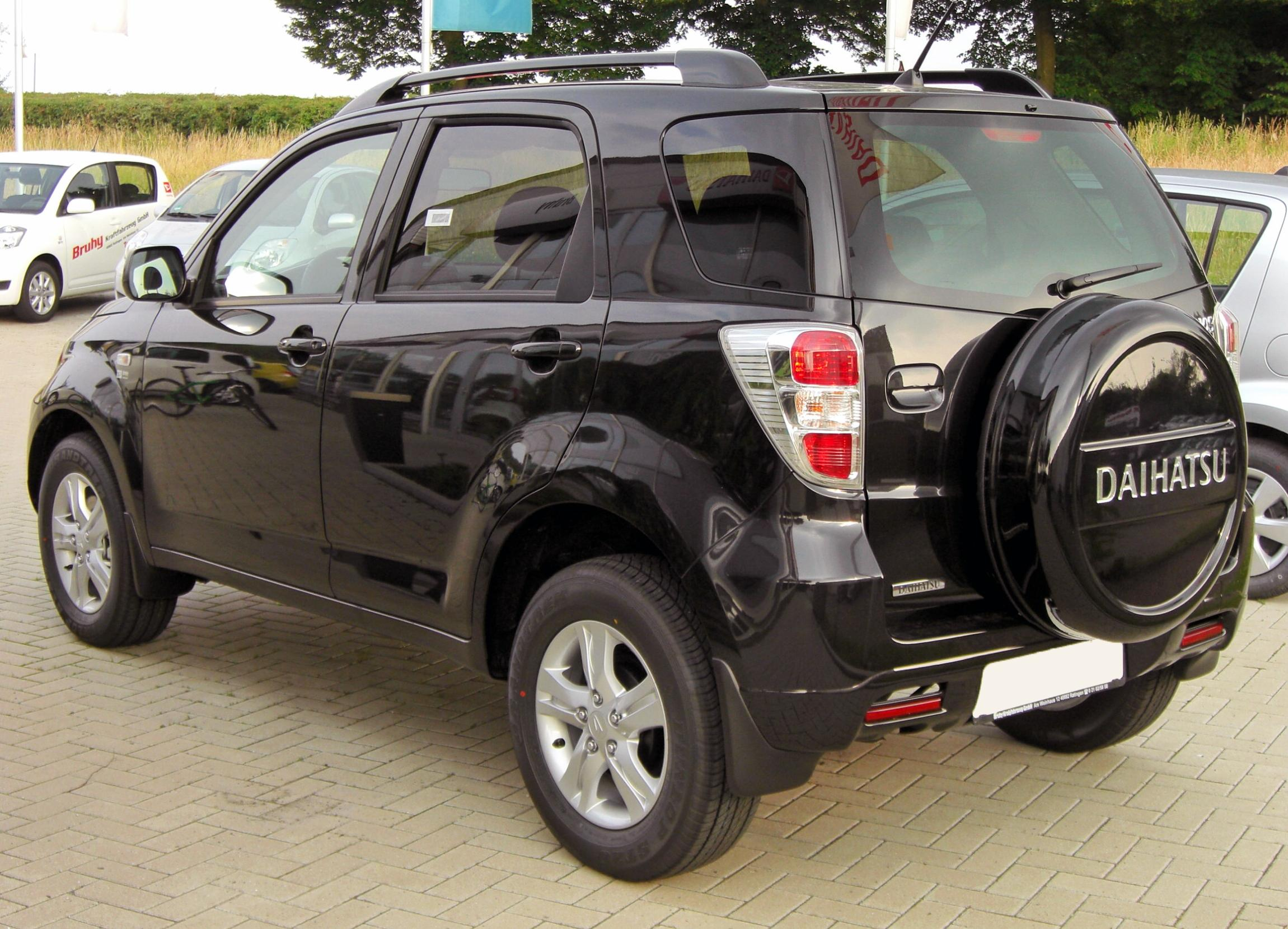
Daihatsu Terios (J200LG; first facelift, Germany)

==== Long-wheelbase ====
Daihatsu Terios

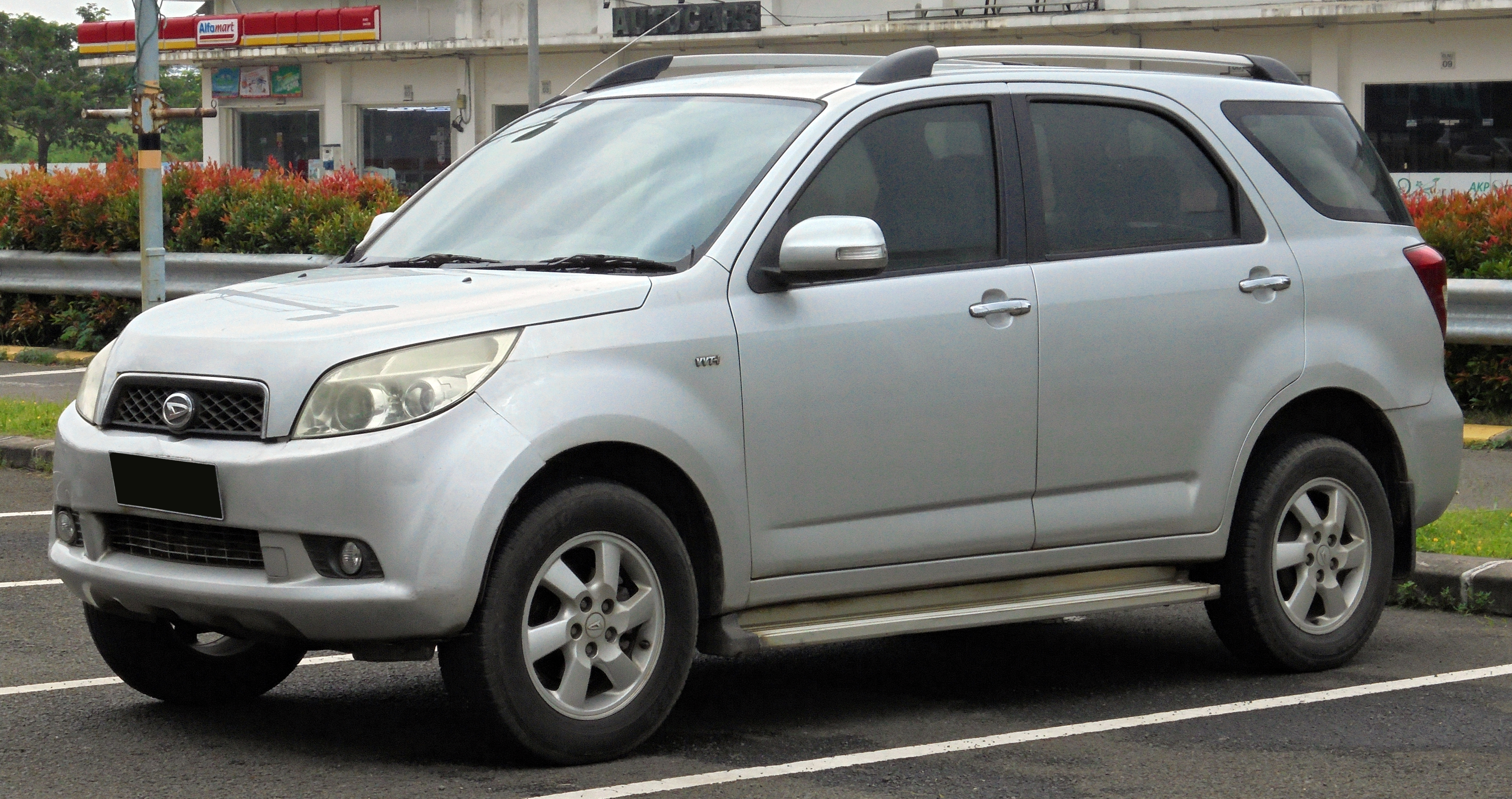
2007 Daihatsu Terios TX Deluxe (F700RG; pre-facelift, Indonesia)

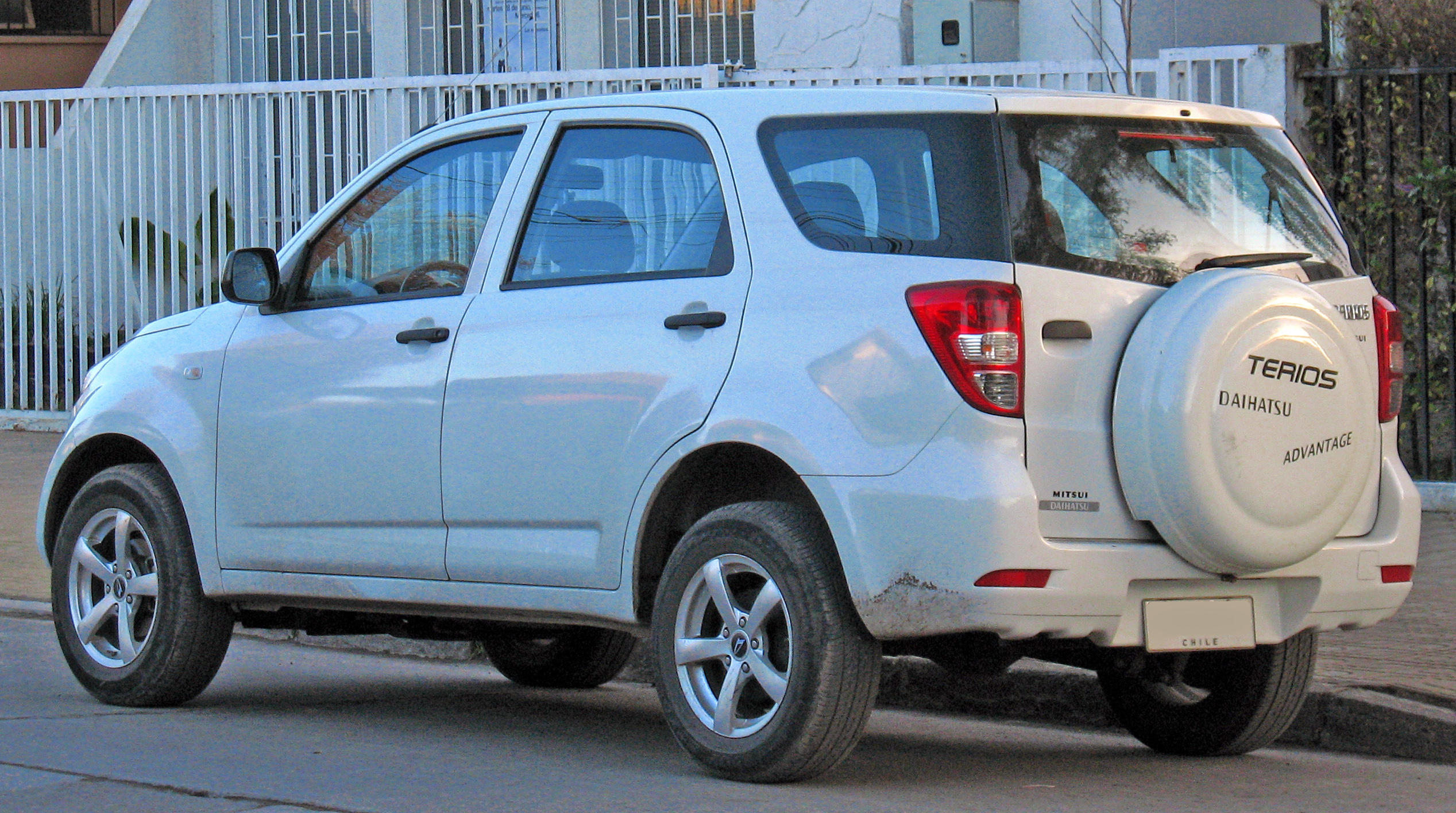
2009 Daihatsu Terios Advantage (F700LG; pre-facelift, Chile)

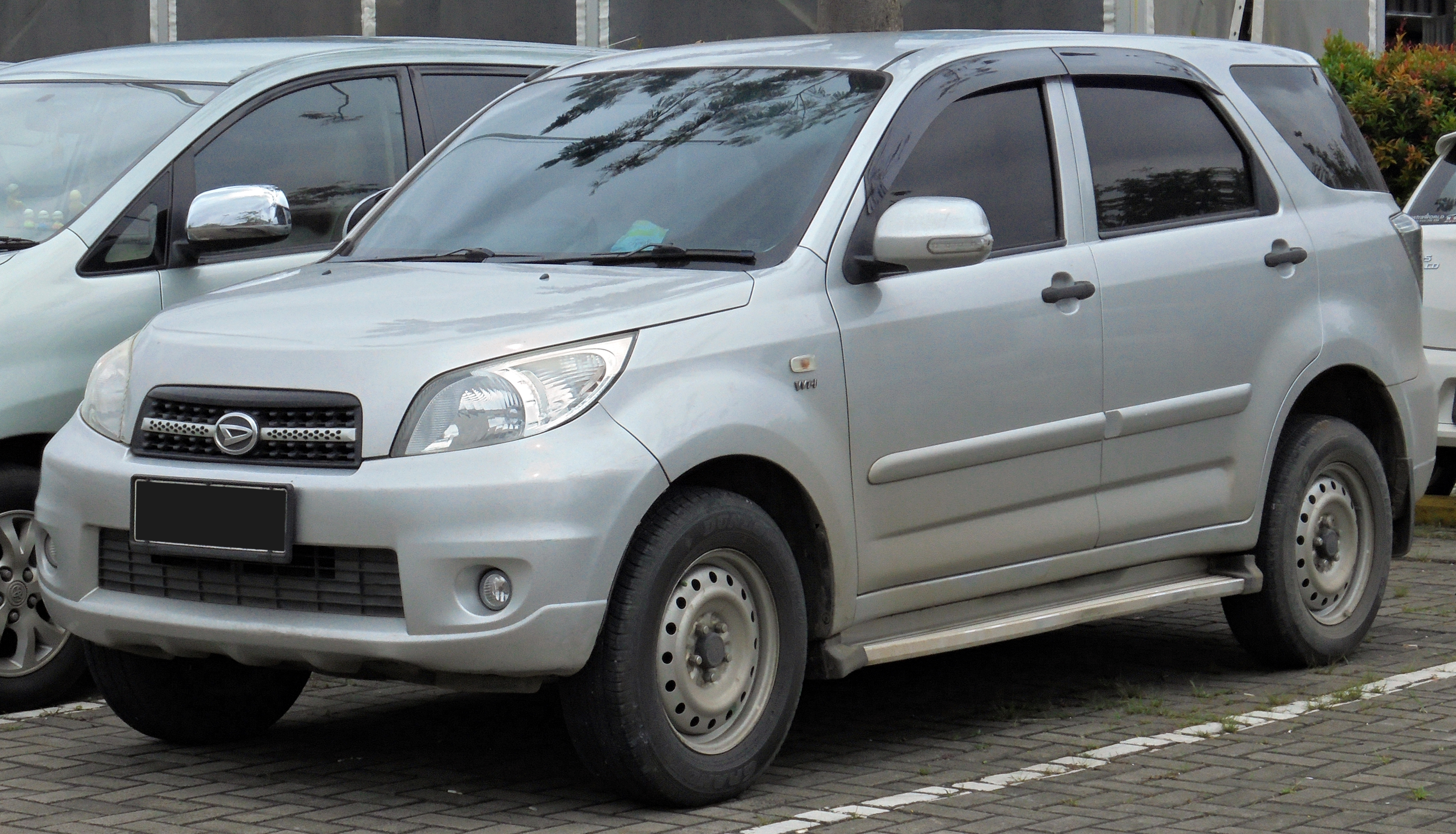
2011 Daihatsu Terios TS Deluxe (F700RG; first facelift, Indonesia)

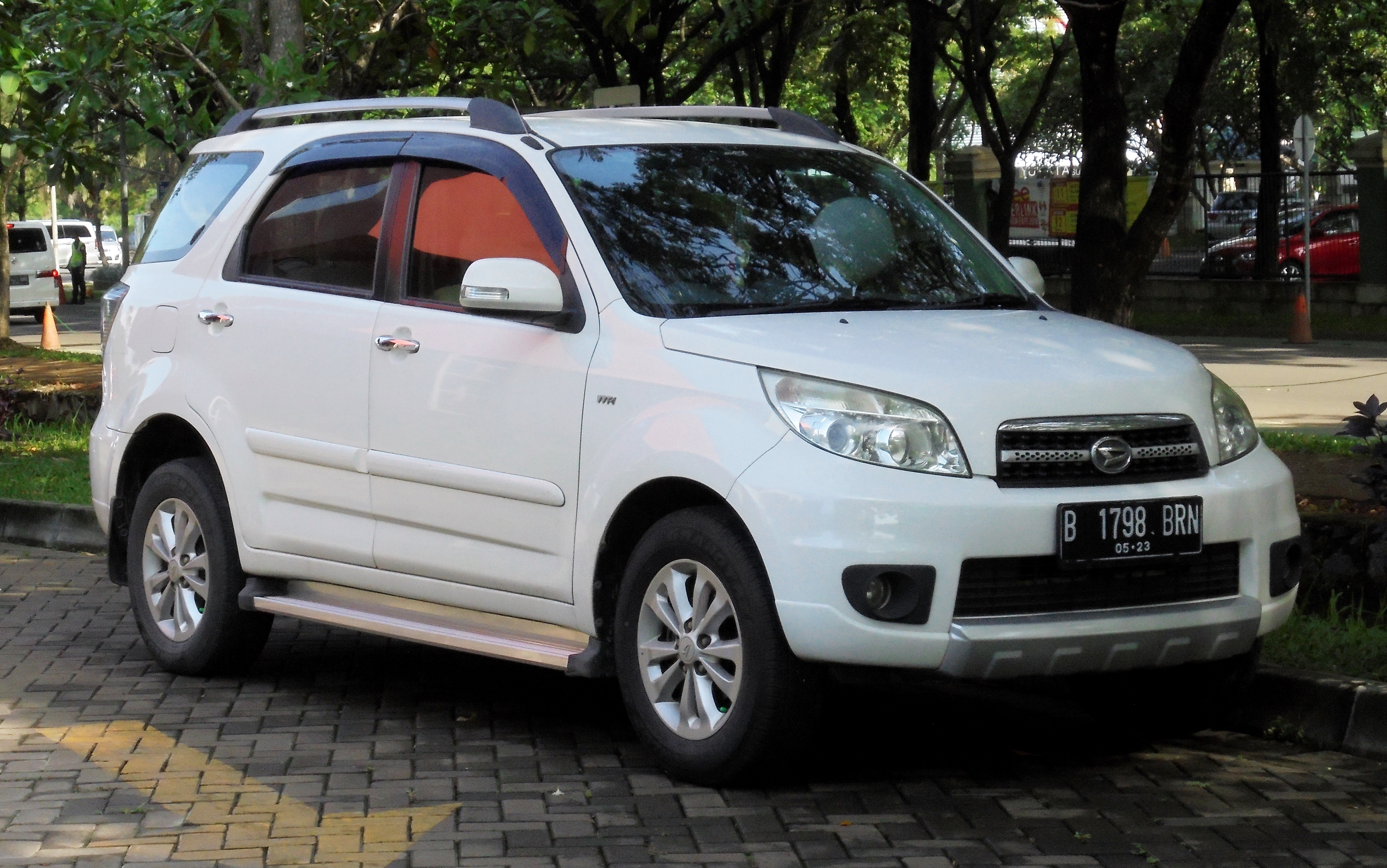
2013 Daihatsu Terios TX Deluxe (F700RG; first facelift, Indonesia)

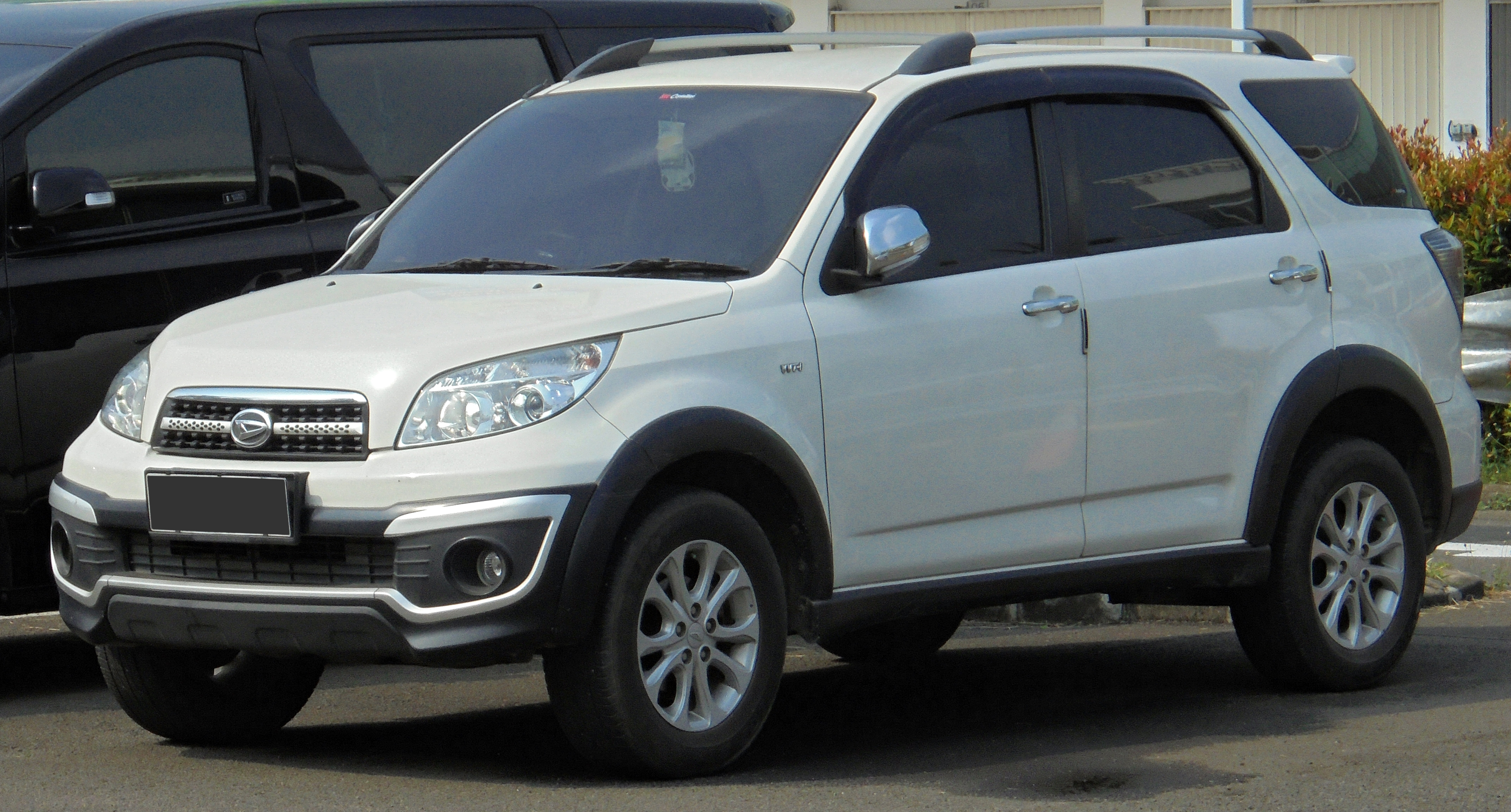
2014 Daihatsu Terios TX Adventure (F700RG; first facelift, Indonesia)

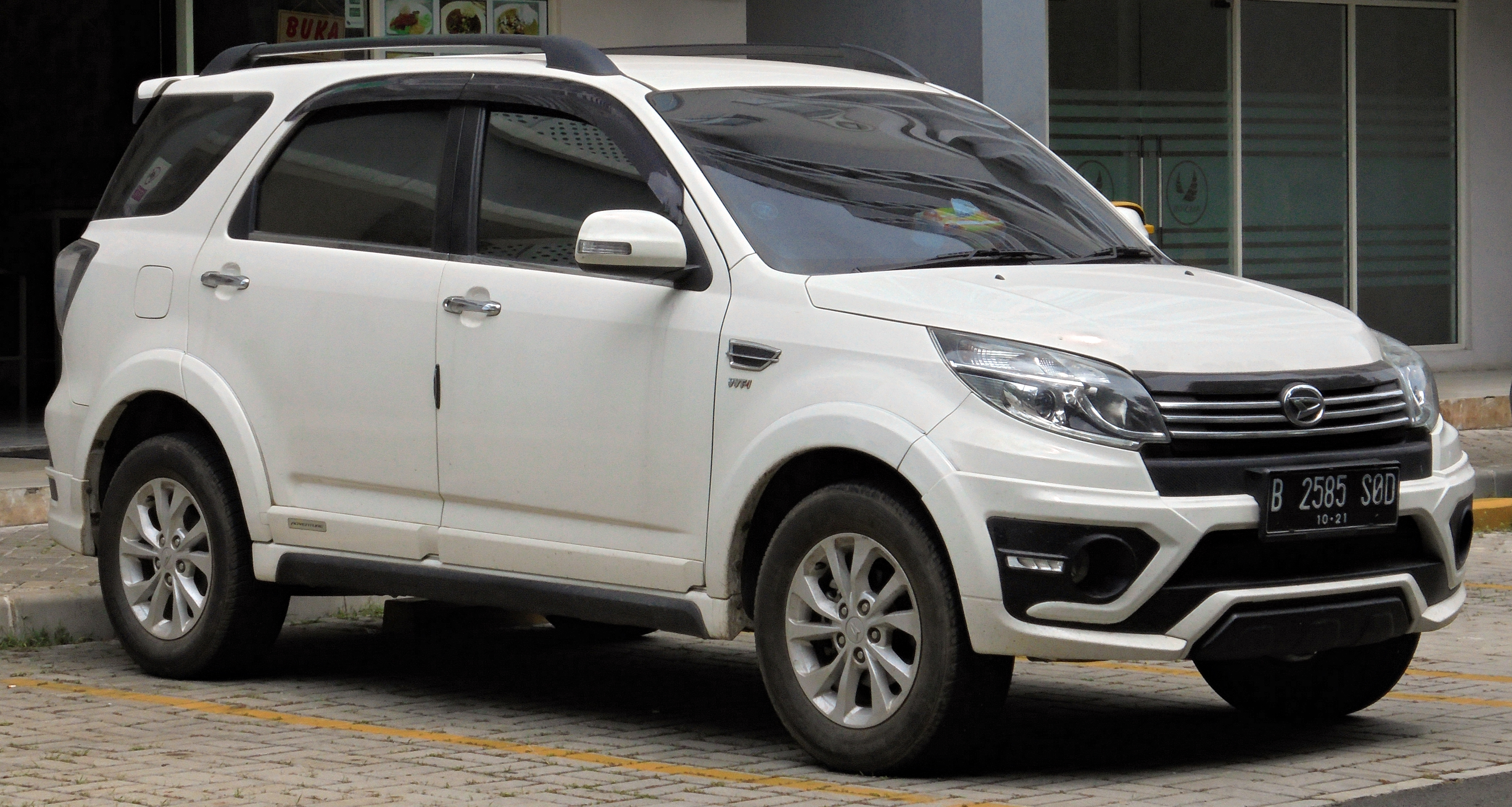
2016 Daihatsu Terios R Adventure (F700RG; second facelift, Indonesia)

Toyota Rush

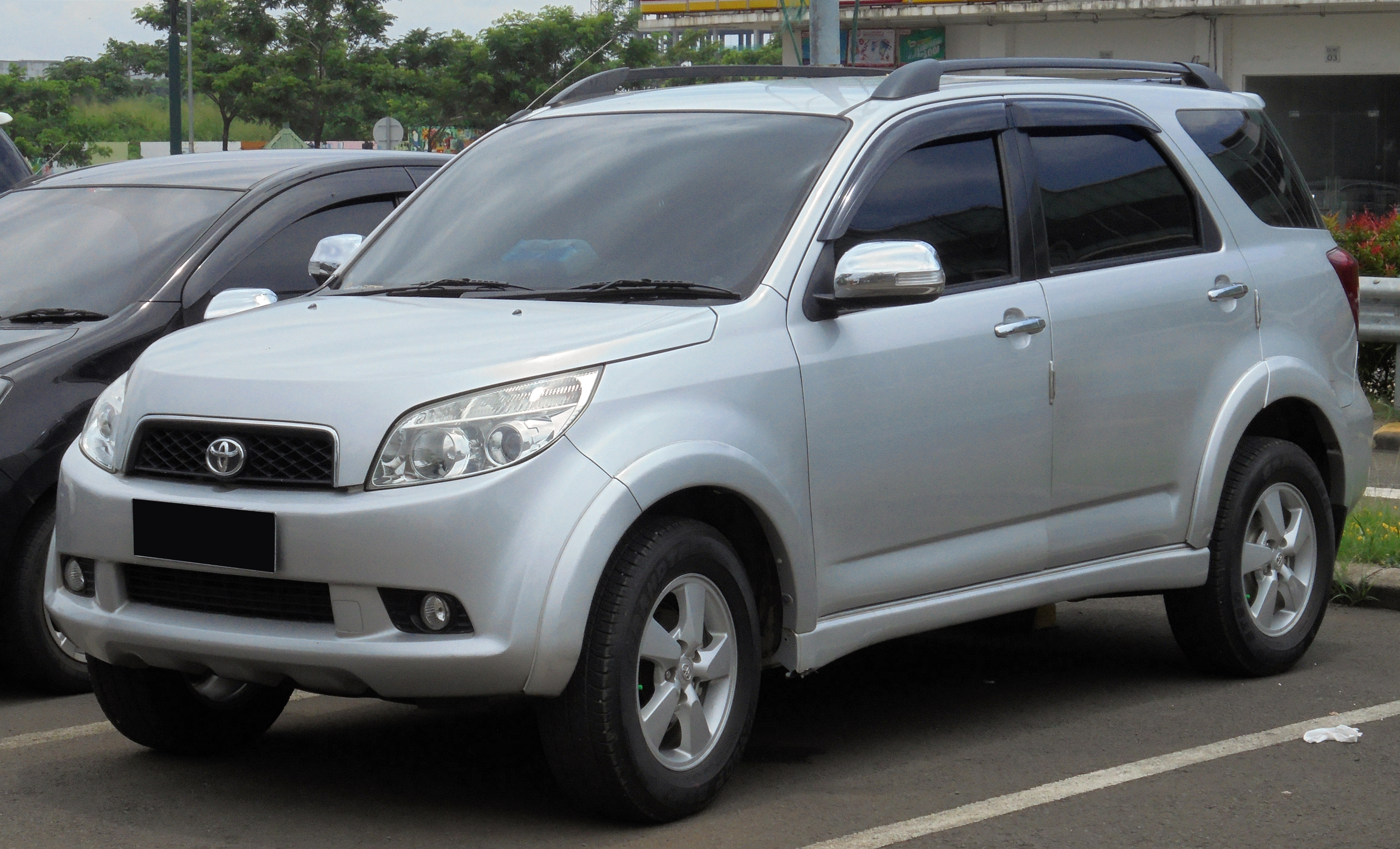
2010 Toyota Rush S (F700RE; pre-facelift, Indonesia)

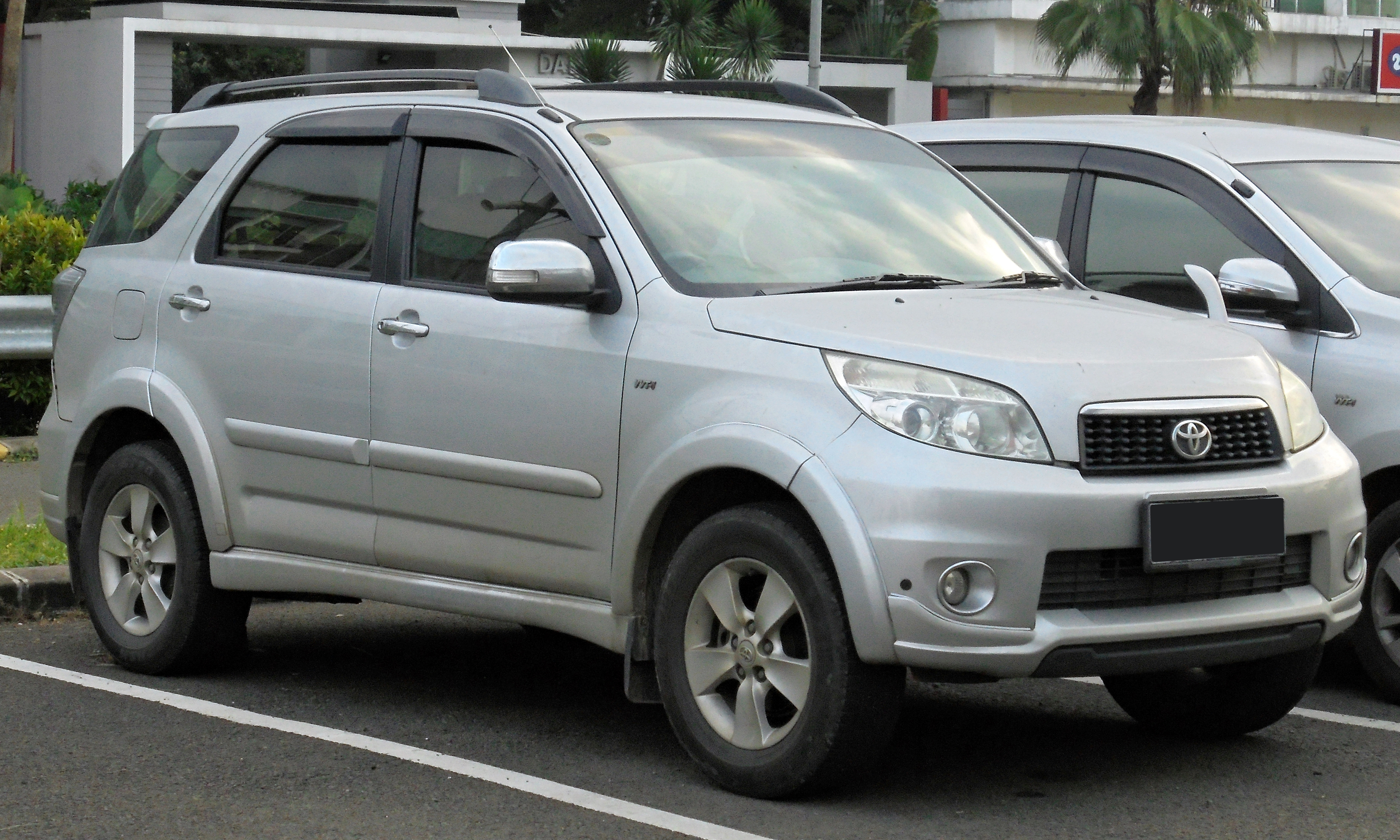
2013 Toyota Rush S (F700RE; first facelift, Indonesia)

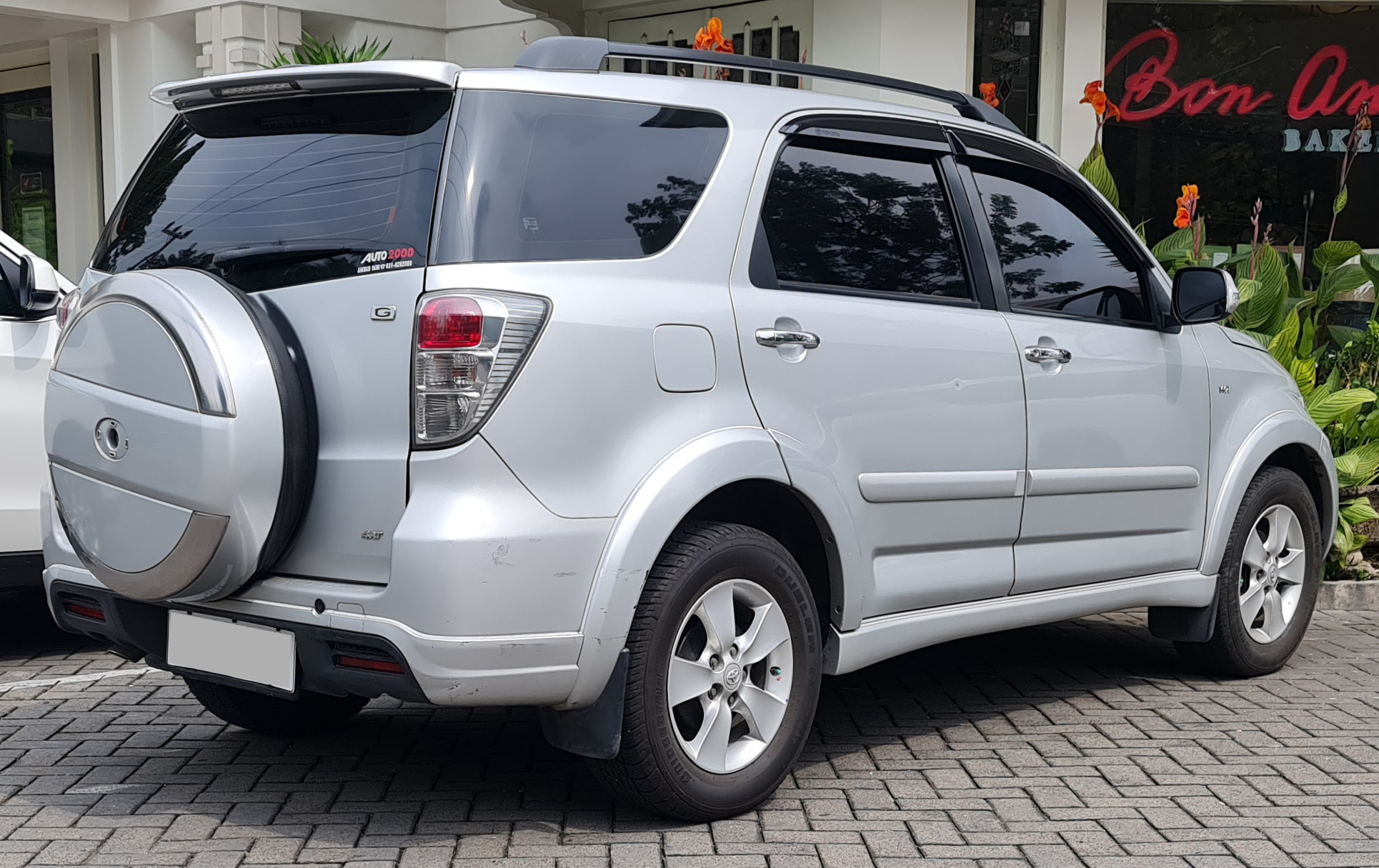
2013 Toyota Rush G (F700RE; first facelift, Indonesia)

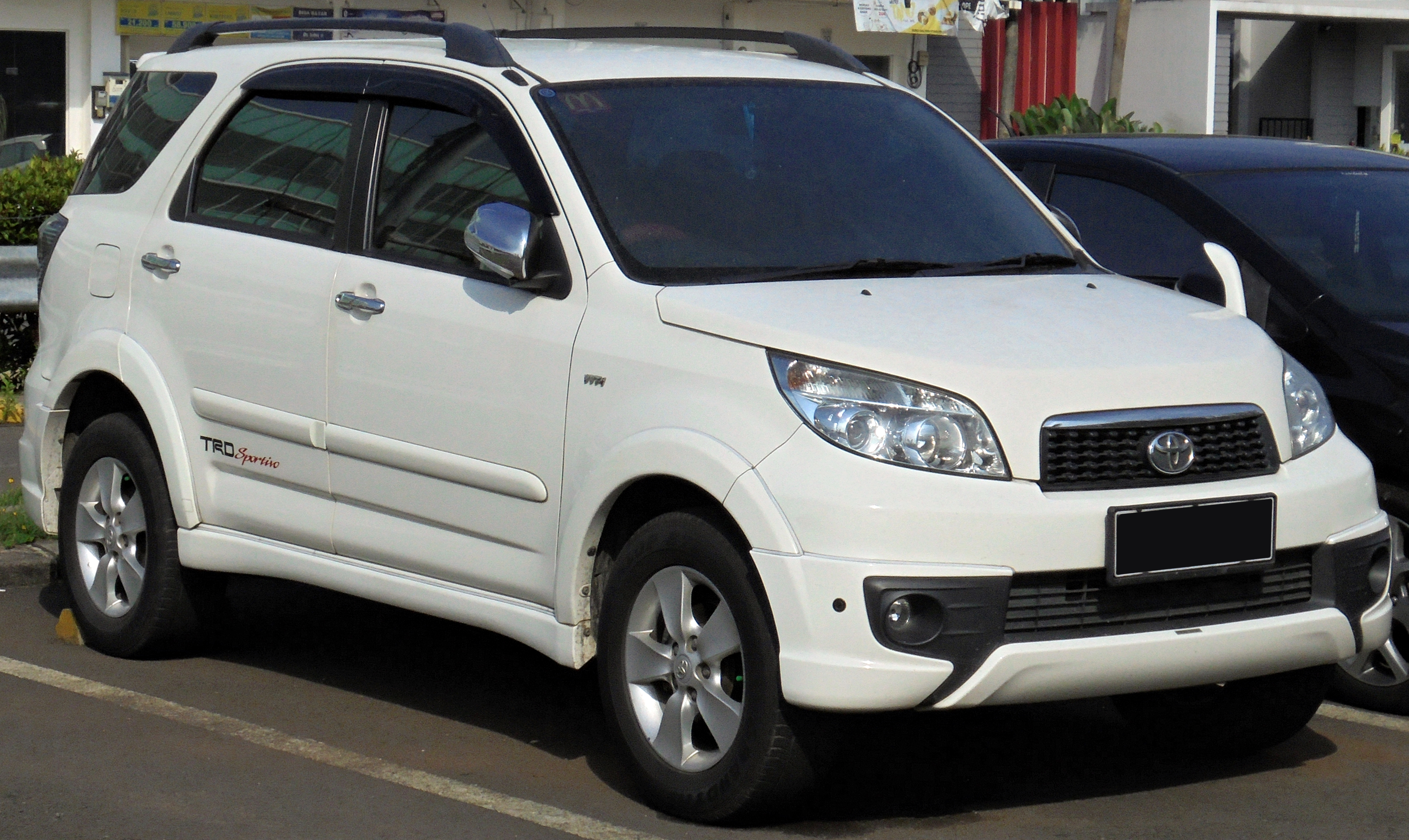
2014 Toyota Rush TRD Sportivo (F700RE; first facelift, Indonesia)

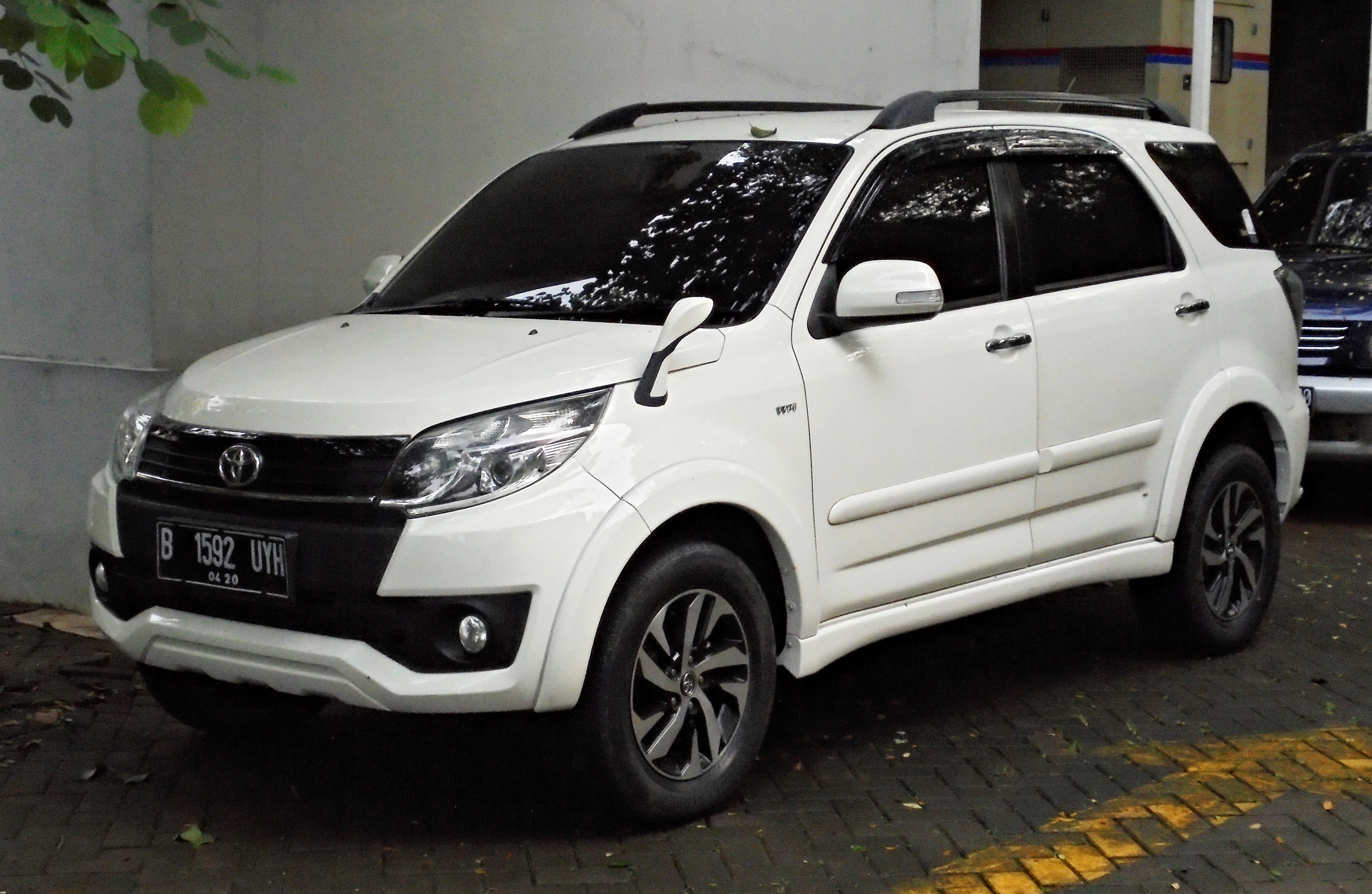
2015 Toyota Rush G (F700RE; second facelift, Indonesia)

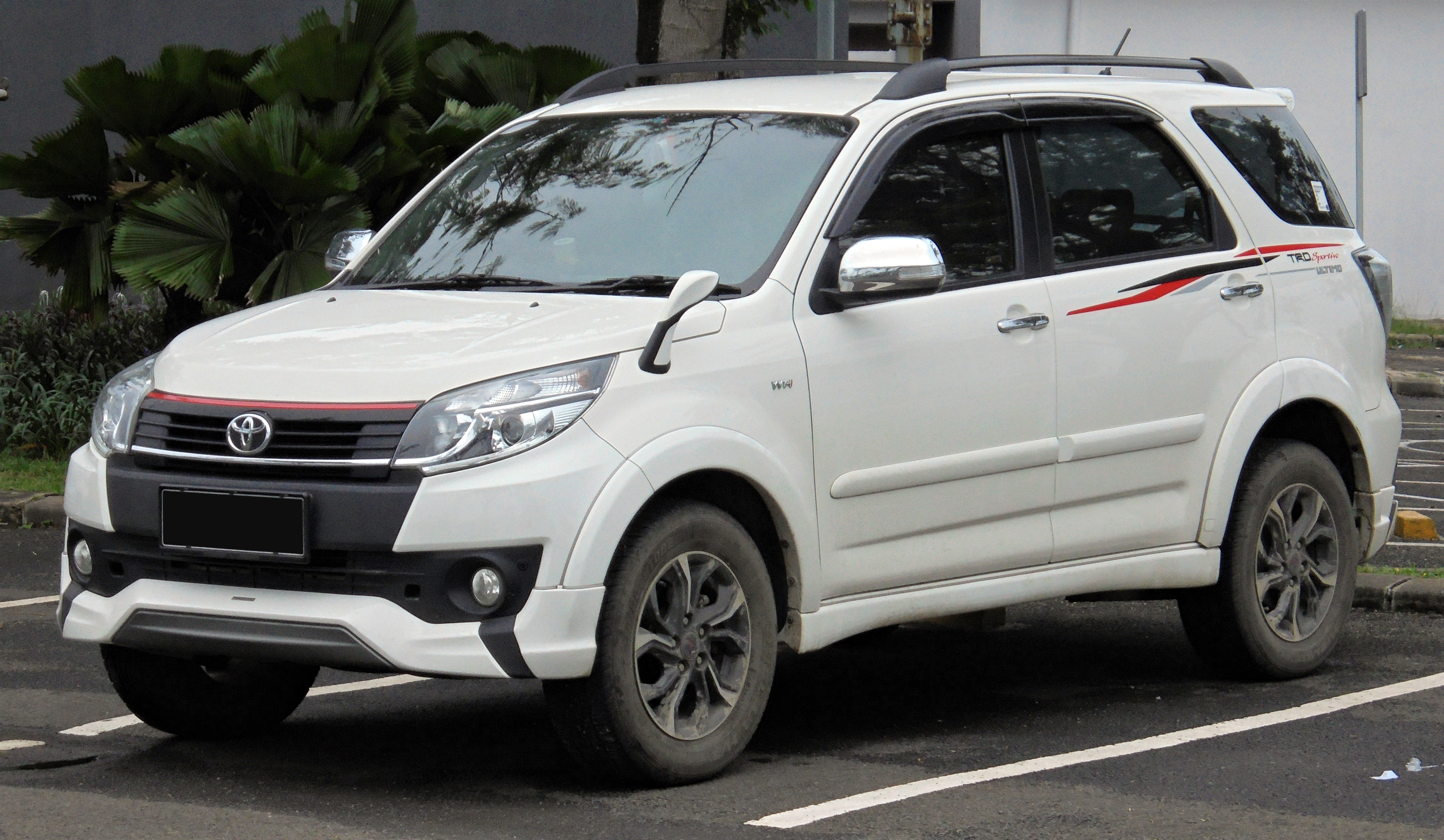
2016 Toyota Rush TRD Sportivo Ultimo (F700RE; second facelift, Indonesia)

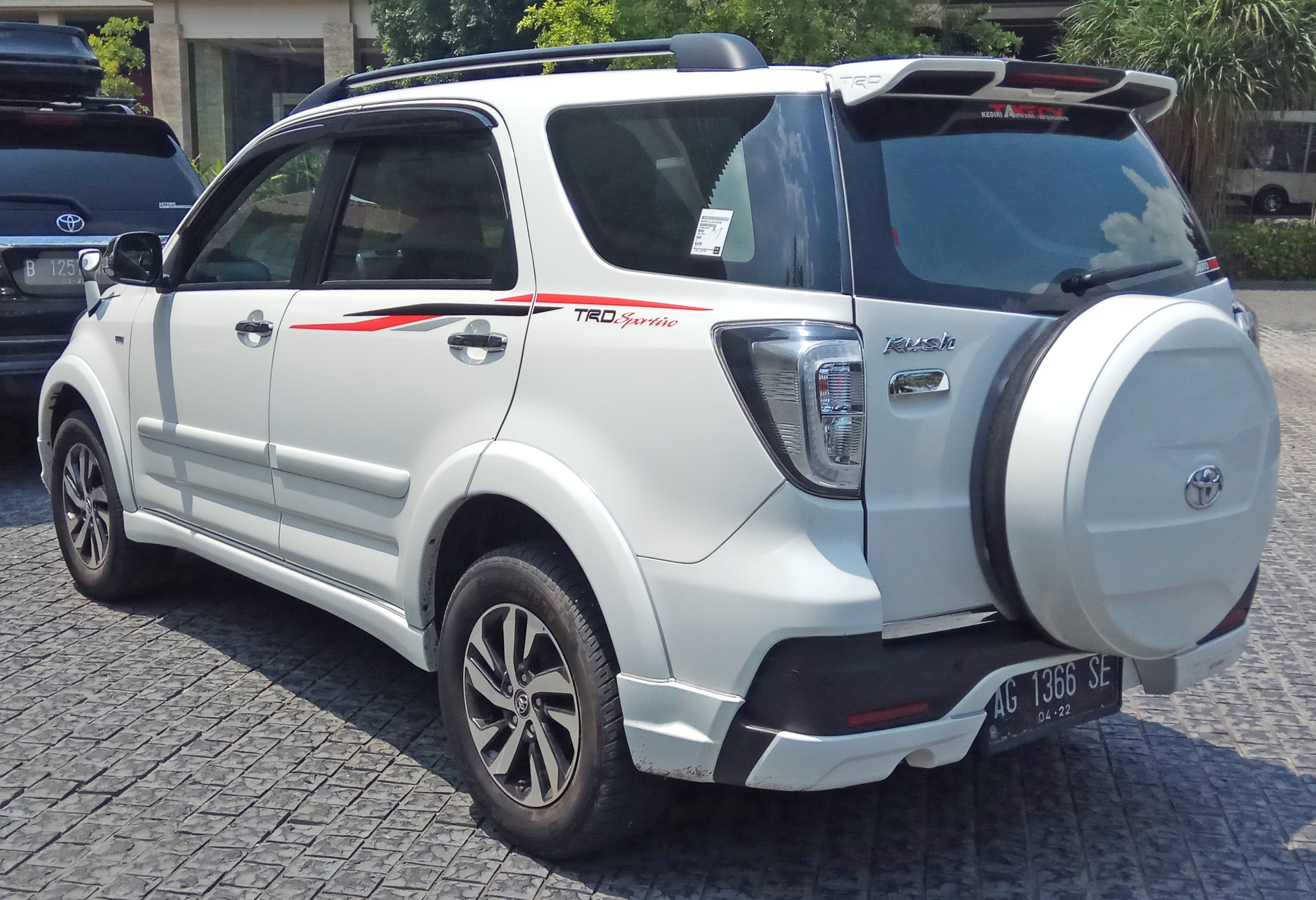
2017 Toyota Rush TRD Sportivo (F700RE; second facelift, Indonesia)

== Third generation (F800/F850; 2017) ==
Third generation
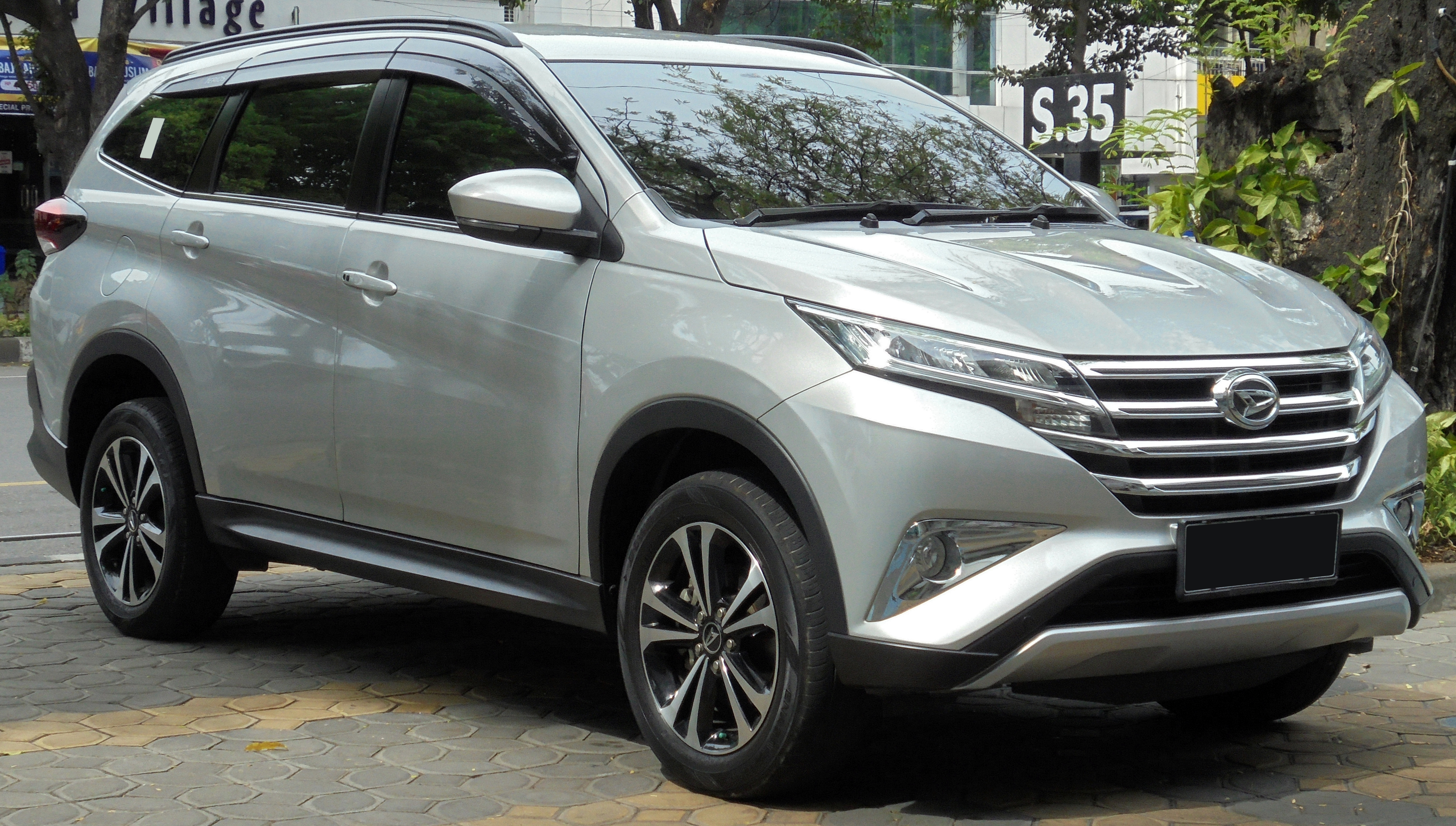
- 2018 Daihatsu Terios R (F800RG; pre-facelift, Indonesia)

Overview
- Model code: F800; F850 (Malaysian production)
- Also called: Toyota Rush; Perodua Aruz (Malaysia)
- Production: November 2017 – present
- Assembly: Indonesia: Sunter, North Jakarta; Karawang, West Java (ADM); Malaysia: Rawang, Selangor (PMSB, Aruz)
- Designer: Jiro Matsueda and Toshiaki Okamoto; Masahisa Nagano (Terios Custom); Keiichi Enokido (interior)

Body and chassis
- Class: Compact SUV
- Layout: Front-engine, rear-wheel-drive
- Chassis: Unibody
- Related: Daihatsu Xenia (F650)

Powertrain
- Engine: Petrol: 1.5 L 2NR-VE Dual VVT-i I4
- Power output: 76.5 kW (103 hp; 104 PS)
- Transmission: 5-speed manual; 4-speed automatic

Dimensions
- Wheelbase: 2,685 mm (105.7 in)
- Length: 4,435–4,466 mm (174.6–175.8 in)
- Width: 1,695 mm (66.7 in)
- Height: 1,705 mm (67.1 in)
- Kerb weight: 1,245–1,270 kg (2,745–2,800 lb)

The third-generation Terios was unveiled in Indonesia on 23 November 2017, along with the second-generation Rush. The development of the car was led by chief engineer Eiji Fujibayashi in 2015, with its design influenced from the FT Concept. Unlike previous models, these generation of cars are sold in long-wheelbase configuration only and neither the short-wheelbase configuration nor four-wheel drive option are offered. It uses the same platform as the long-wheelbase version of the second-generation model, retaining the built-in ladder-frame monocoque body, albeit with some tweaks.

Compared to its predecessors, the design of the car has been made more streamlined, akin to crossovers. This model has a rear liftgate rather than a side-opening rear door and no longer has the spare tyre mounted on the rear door, along an updated alloy wheel design and a keyless entry system with push start engine button. Both models are powered by a 1.5 L 2NR-VE engine, which was the same engine used in the 2015 facelifted Toyota Avanza/Daihatsu Xenia.

The model codes are F800 for the Terios/international market Rush and F850 for the Malaysian market Rush/Perodua Aruz.

=== Markets ===
==== Indonesia ====
The Indonesian market Terios/Rush went on sale on 3 January 2018. Both models are offered only in three-row configuration. With the third row backrest folded down, there are 217 L (7.7 cu ft) of storage space, which is expanded to 514 L (18.2 cu ft) when tumbled up.

The Terios was initially available in 4 grade levels: X, X Deluxe, R and R Deluxe. The R Custom grade was later added in August 2018. The Rush came with G and TRD Sportivo grades.

Due to high demand, the production of Terios and Rush was also conducted in Astra Daihatsu Motor's Karawang plant alongside the Sunter plant since August 2019.

In August 2021, the TRD Sportivo grade of Rush was renamed to GR Sport, along with other TRD Sportivo models. Redesigned bumper add-ons and side body mouldings were included in this update. It also received start-stop system as standard, followed by Terios in September.

The facelifted Terios was launched on 8 June 2023 with X, R and R Custom grades, while the X Deluxe and R Deluxe grades were discontinued. Optional Astra Daihatsu Styling (ADS) package with exterior add-ons and other accessories is available for X and R grades.

The GR Sport grade of the Rush was updated on 1 April 2024, changes include a new grille, black exterior parts, new alloy rim designs, and a new 9" touchscreen infotainment system. The G grade remained unchanged.

The Terios Special Edition was unveiled at the 2026 GIIAS. Limited run of 20 units. Based on 1.5 X automatic grade, features a two-tone colour, the black coloured 'D' emblem, and black alloy wheels.

The GR Sport grade of the Rush received another update on 20 November 2026 at the 5th Gaikindo Jakarta Auto Week, changes include a new grille, new back door ornament with stop lamp, and new fog lamp covers.

==== Philippines ====
The Rush was released in the Philippines on 4 May 2018 and was initially offered in two grade levels: E, which has five seats and is available with either manual or automatic transmission, and G, which has seven seats and is only available with an automatic transmission.

In November 2020, the E grade received a reverse camera and 7-seater as standard.

In May 2022, the GR Sport grade was launched which replaced the previous top-spec G grade. The Rush was also updated with an updated 7-inch infotainment system with Apple CarPlay and Android Auto compatibility as standard for both the E and GR Sport grades.

In January 2024, the E grade was removed from the lineup, leaving only the GR Sport as the sole grade.

==== Brunei ====
After the replacement of the first- and second-generation Terios (sold under Daihatsu badge), the Rush was released in Brunei on 5 May 2018. The car is available in mid- or high-grade model lineups, four-speed automatic transmission and seven-seat variant only.

==== Bangladesh ====
In Bangladesh, the Rush is available in two grade level: G and S, which has 7 seats and 4-speed automatic transmission option only. S has minor cosmetic changes and a button on steering wheel for accepting call.

==== United Arab Emirates ====
The Rush was released in UAE on 14 May 2018. Only a seven-seater version is available.

==== South Africa ====
The Rush was released in South Africa on 4 July 2018, replaced the previous Daihatsu-badged Terios. It is only available in a five-seat version and offered in five-speed manual or four-speed automatic options.

==== Jamaica ====
The Rush was released in Jamaica on 8 July 2018. Only a seven-seater version is available.

==== New Caledonia (France) ====
The Rush is currently on sale, as of May 2024, in this sui generis French Overseas Collectivity. It is the only place in the entire French Republic where the Rush can be purchased officially.

==== Colombia ====
The Rush was released in Colombia on 26 July 2018. Only a seven-seater version is available.

==== Chile ====
The Rush was released in Chile on 1 October 2020. Only a seven-seater version is available.

==== Pakistan ====
The Rush was unveiled in Pakistan on 31 August 2018. It went on sale on 10 September 2018. Three variants are available and there is only a seven-seat option.

==== Malaysia ====
===== Toyota Rush =====
The Rush was launched in Malaysia on 18 October 2018. It was assembled by Perodua as a complete knock-down unit at its plant in Rawang, Selangor. There is only a seven-seat variant. It is only available with a four-speed automatic transmission though two grade levels were offered: 1.5 G and 1.5 S. The 1.5 S grade is equipped with a pre-collision system. It was discontinued due to low sales in January 2024.

===== Perodua Aruz =====
The Rush is also sold by Perodua as the Perodua Aruz, which was launched on 15 January 2019. The name "Aruz" is taken from the Malay word "arus", meaning "flow". A media preview occurred in December 2018 while booking opened on 3 January 2019; Perodua had received 2,200 bookings by the time of launch. There is only a seven-seat version. It is available only with a four-speed automatic transmission though two grade levels are available: 1.5 X and 1.5 AV (Advance). By March 2019, Perodua had successfully delivered 4,000 units of the Aruz with a total booking count at 14,000, and by the beginning of June 2019, roughly 13,000 Aruz had been delivered with a total booking count standing at 25,000.

The Aruz was went on sale in Singapore on 13 April 2021 and the car were offered only in 1.5 X variant.

=== Safety ===
==== Toyota Rush ====
ASEAN NCAP test results Toyota Rush (2018)
Test	Points
Overall:	5 /5 stars
Adult occupant:	43.25
Child occupant:	21.33
Safety assist:	20.83

==== Perodua Aruz ====
ASEAN NCAP test results Perodua Aruz (2018)
Test	Points
Overall:	5 /5 stars
Adult occupant:	43.25
Child occupant:	21.01
Safety assist:	22.22

==== Recalls ====
On 15 July 2019, Toyota had announced that around 60,000 units of the Indonesian market Rush manufactured from December 2017 to February 2019 would be recalled due to a problem regarding the airbags. It is stated that the affected models were found to have an improperly programmed airbag control module which could cause the side curtain airbags to accidentally deploy even when the vehicle is running normally. An impact on the rear wheel when passing a pothole or dent may be misinterpreted as a collision, which may cause deployment of the side curtain airbags. The Terios models were not affected due to the fact that the model is not being equipped with side curtain airbags.

=== Awards ===
In July 2018, the car won the "Good Design Indonesia of The Year" award.

=== Gallery ===
Daihatsu Terios

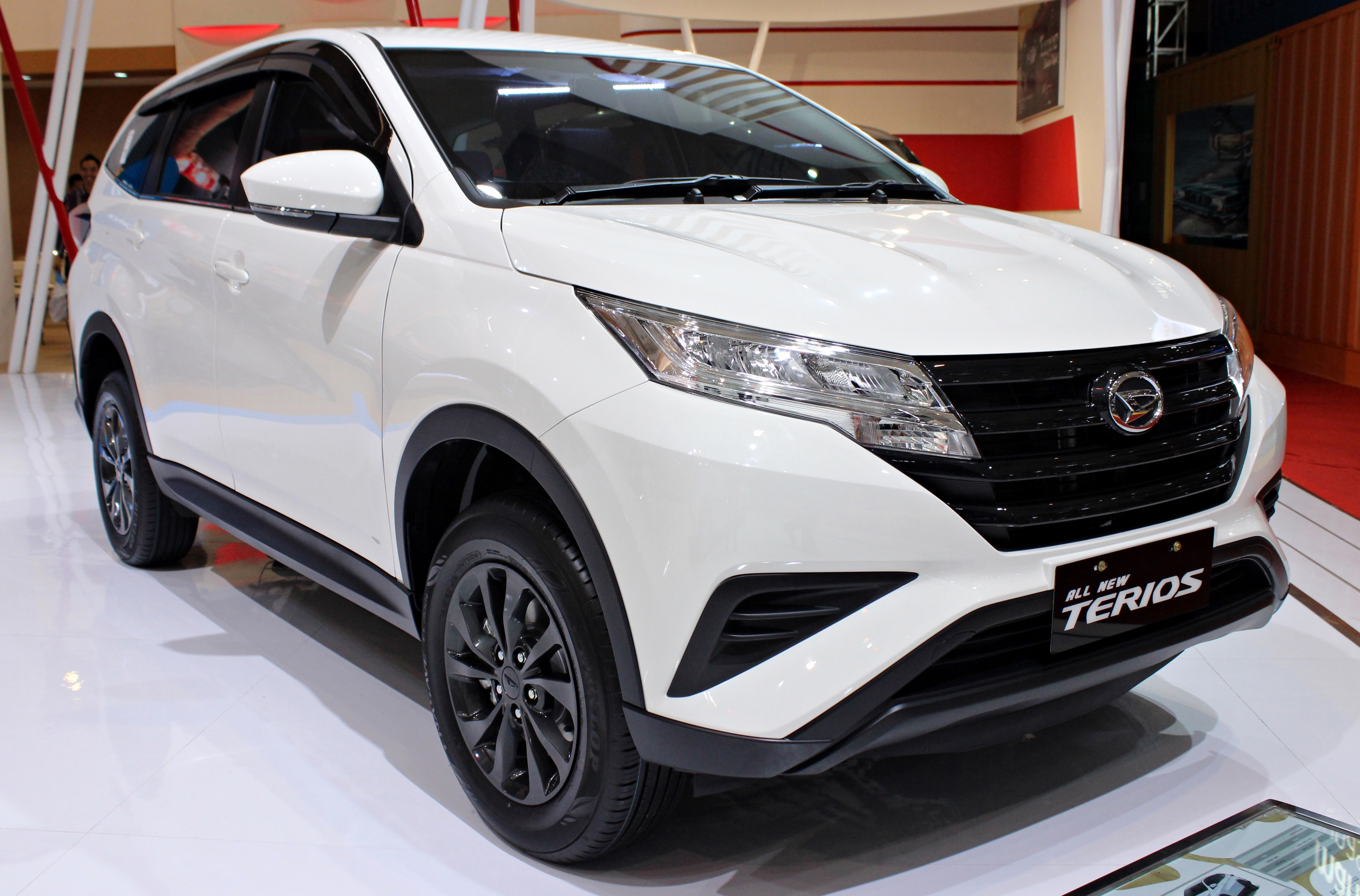
2018 Daihatsu Terios X Deluxe (F800RG; pre-facelift, Indonesia)

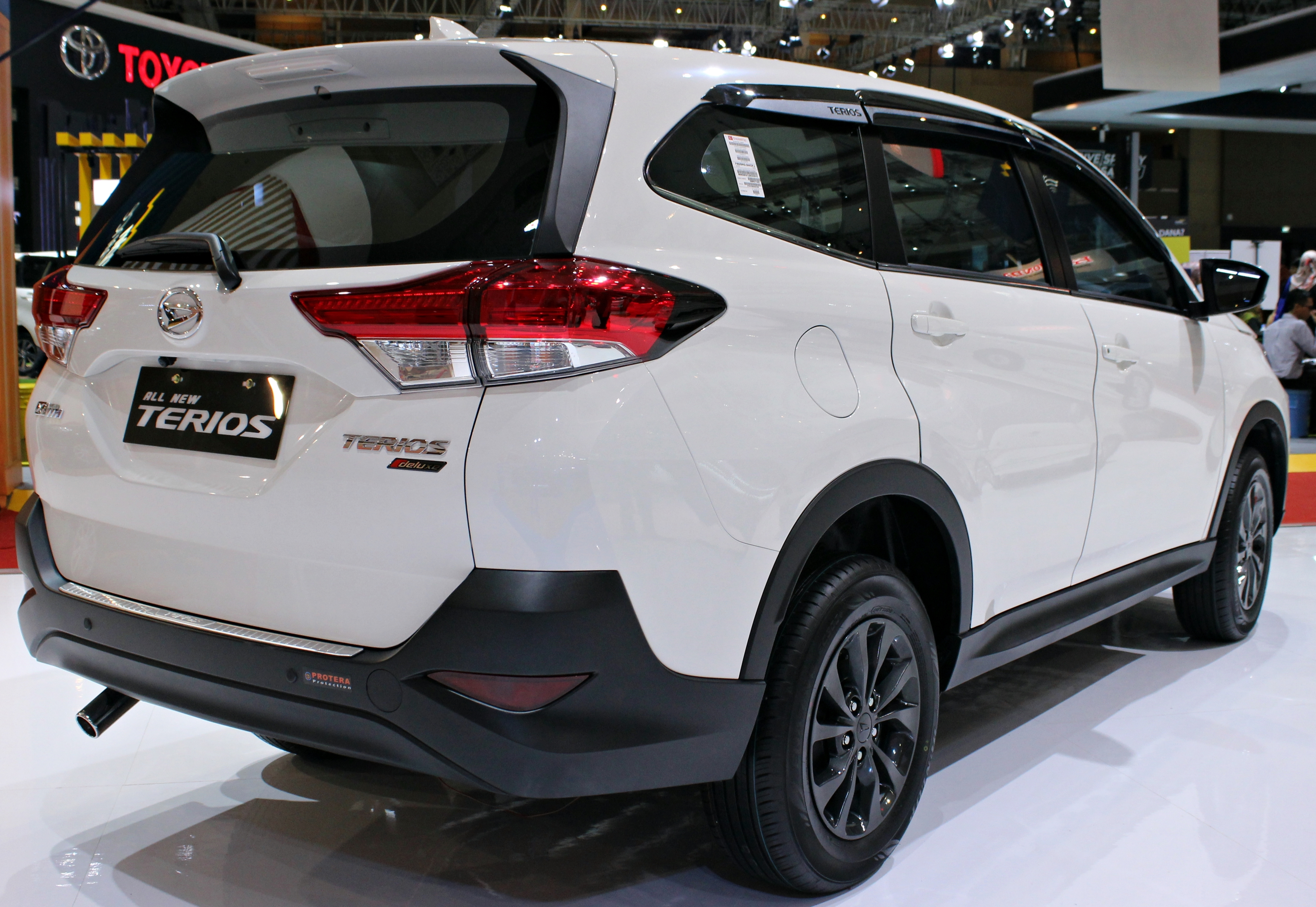
2018 Daihatsu Terios X Deluxe (F800RG; pre-facelift, Indonesia)

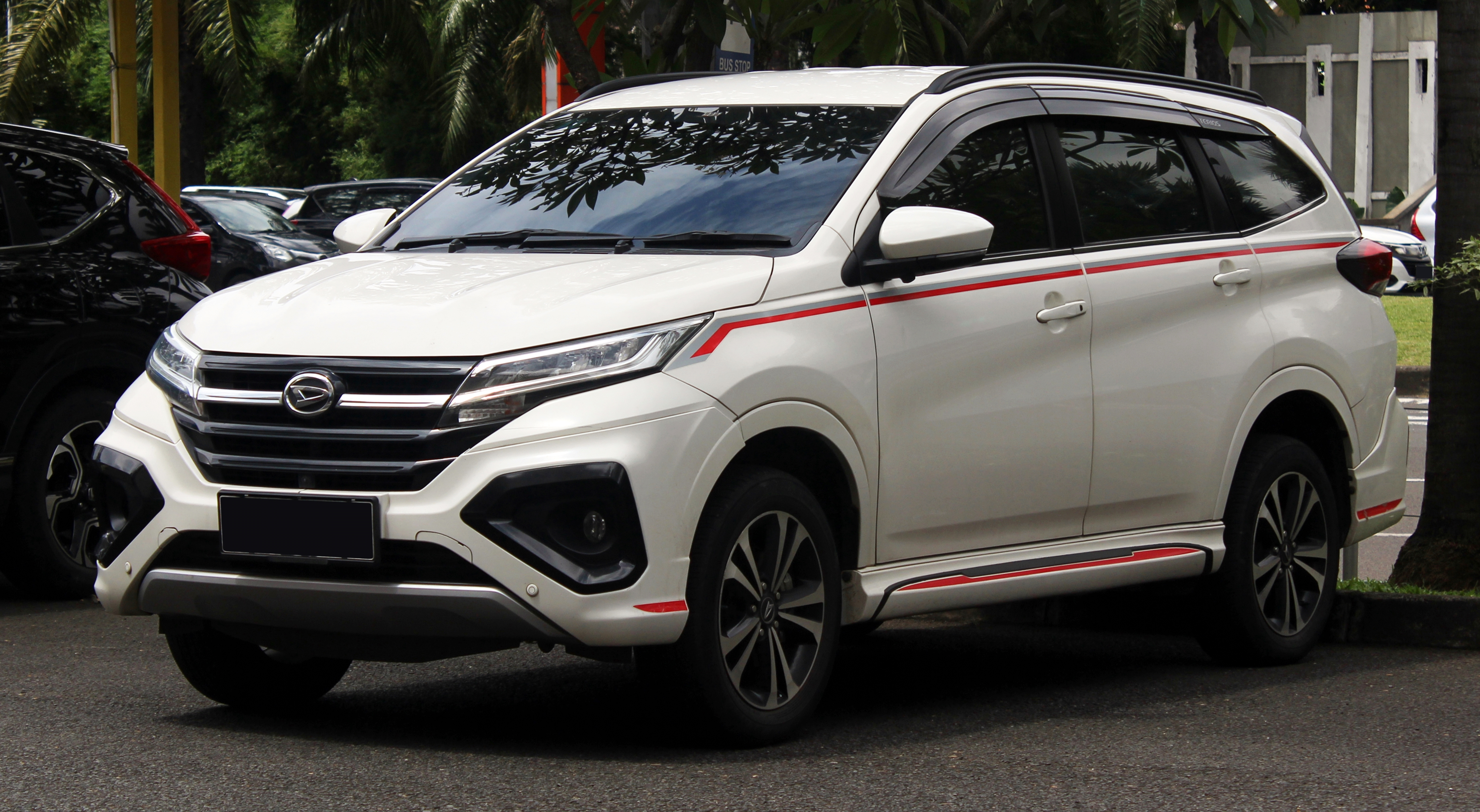
2019 Daihatsu Terios R Custom (F800RG; pre-facelift, Indonesia)

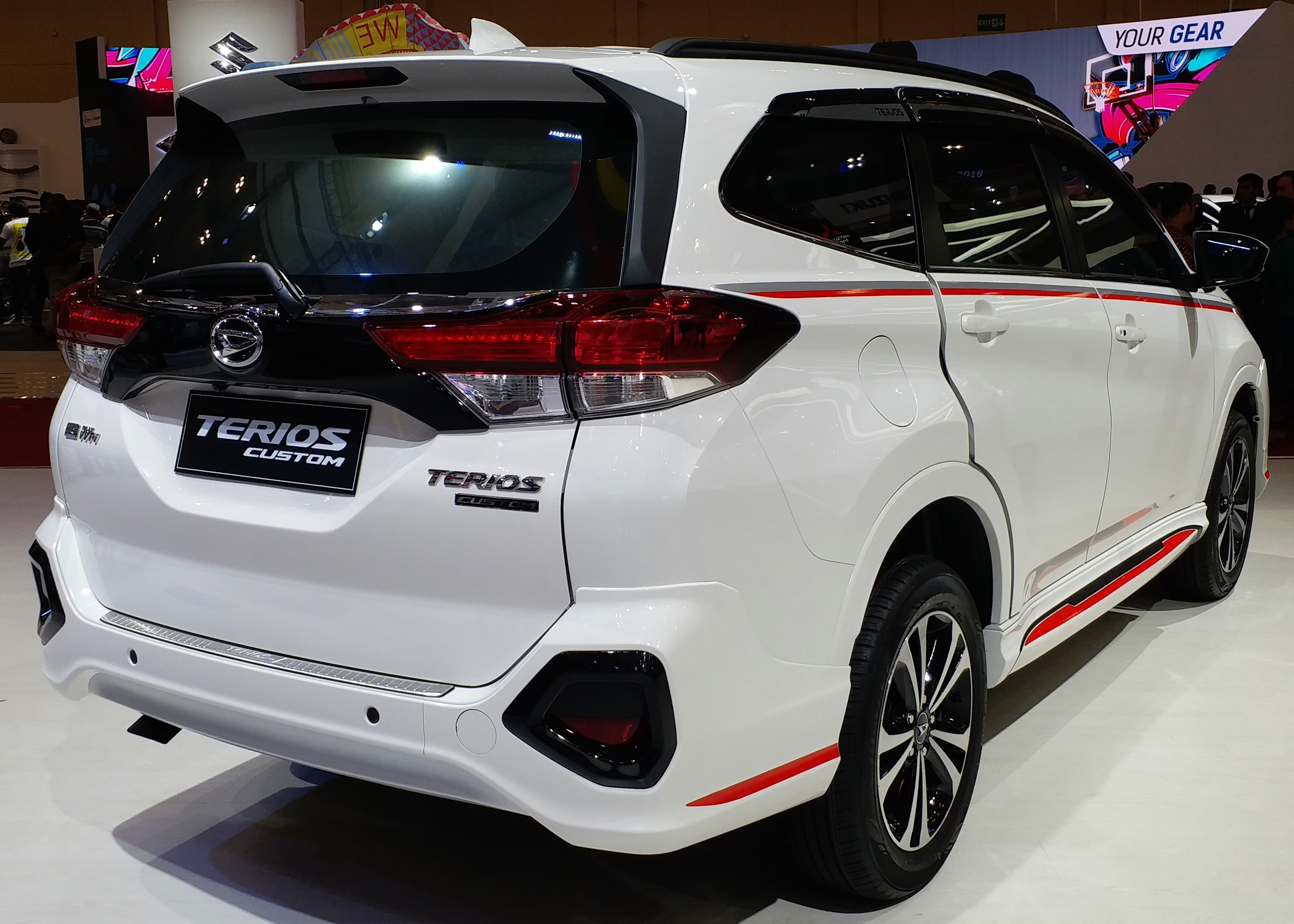
2018 Daihatsu Terios R Custom (F800RG; pre-facelift, Indonesia)

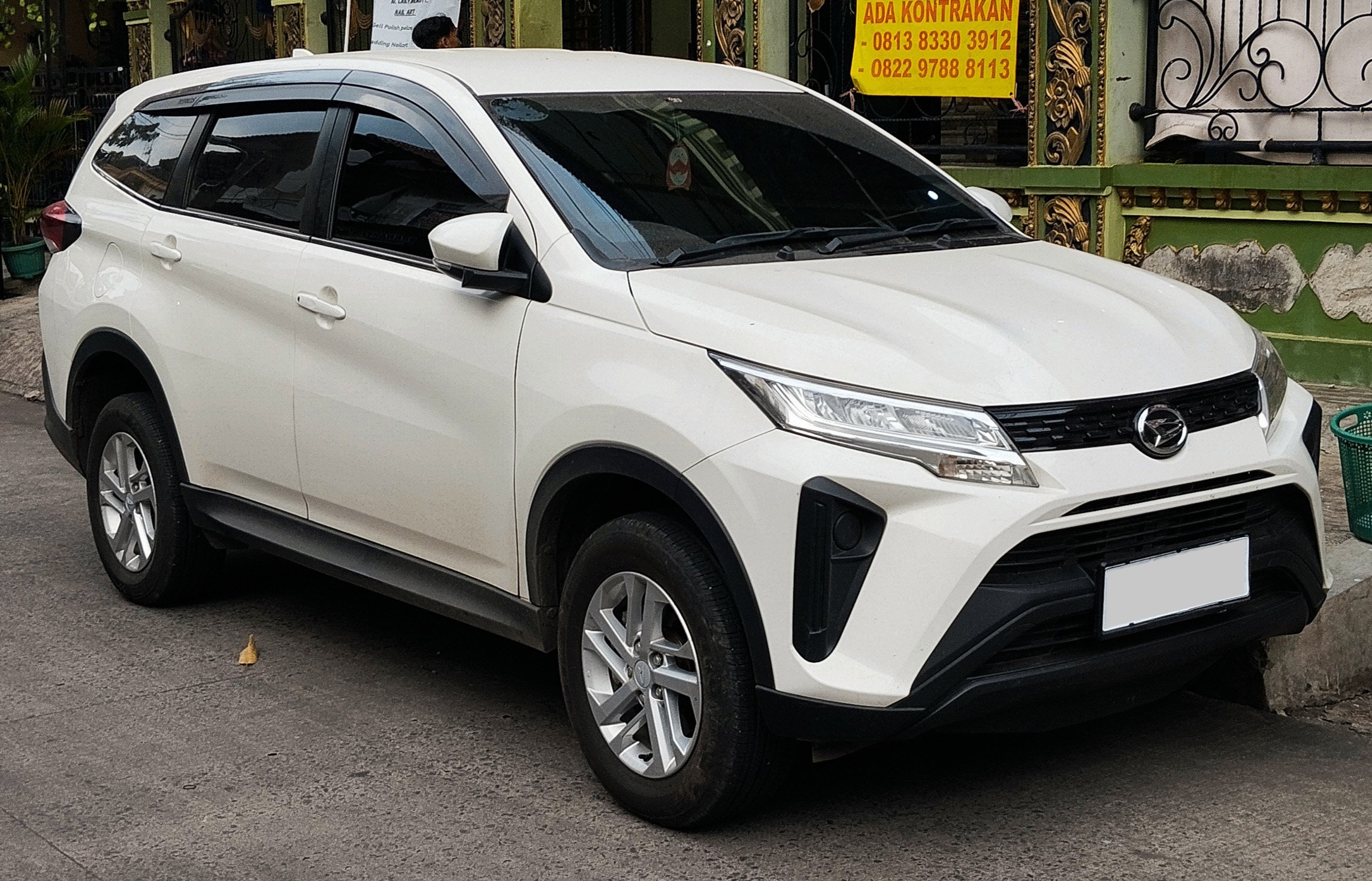
2024 Daihatsu Terios X (F800RG; facelift, Indonesia)

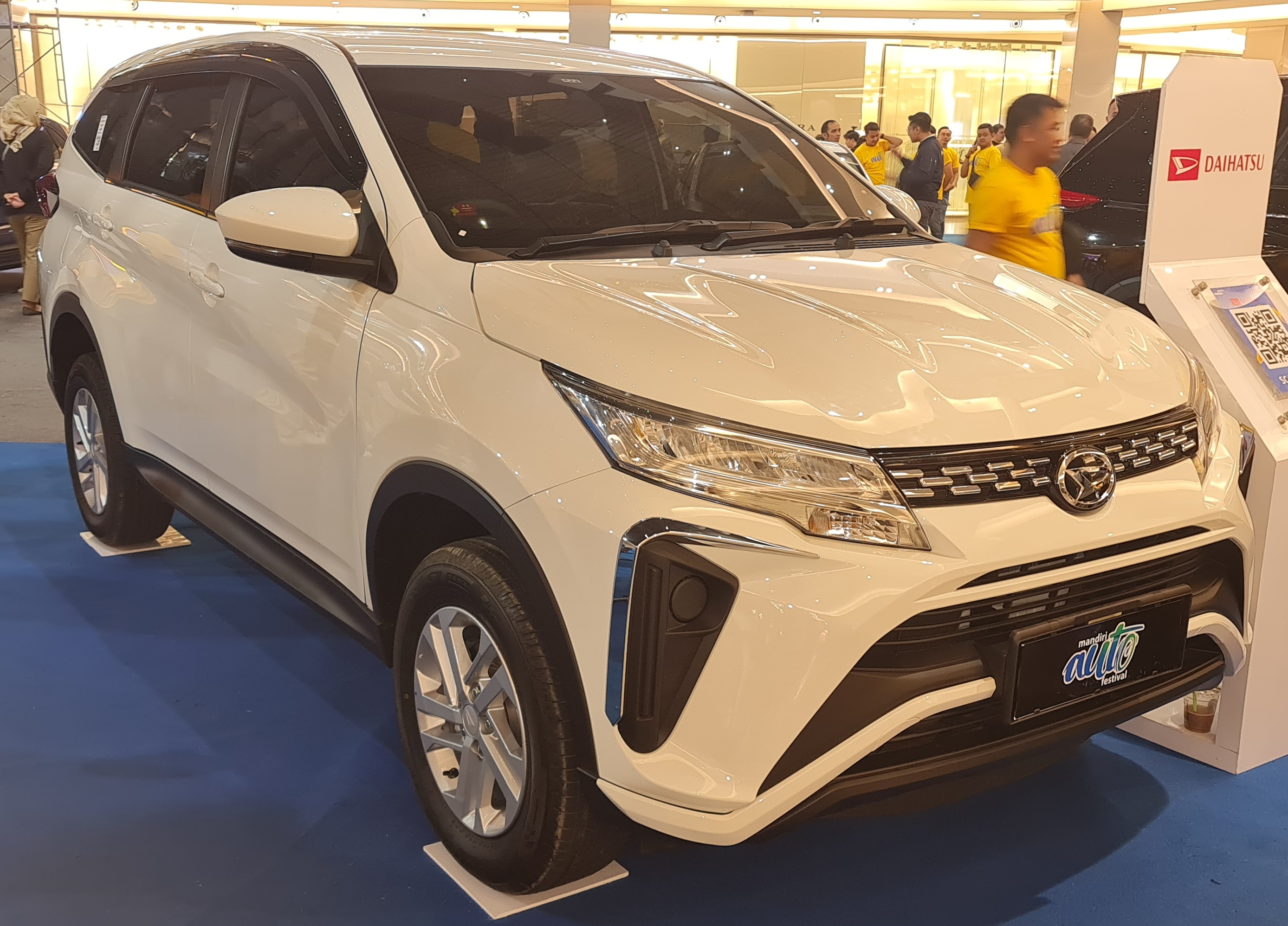
2023 Daihatsu Terios X ADS (F800RG; facelift, Indonesia)

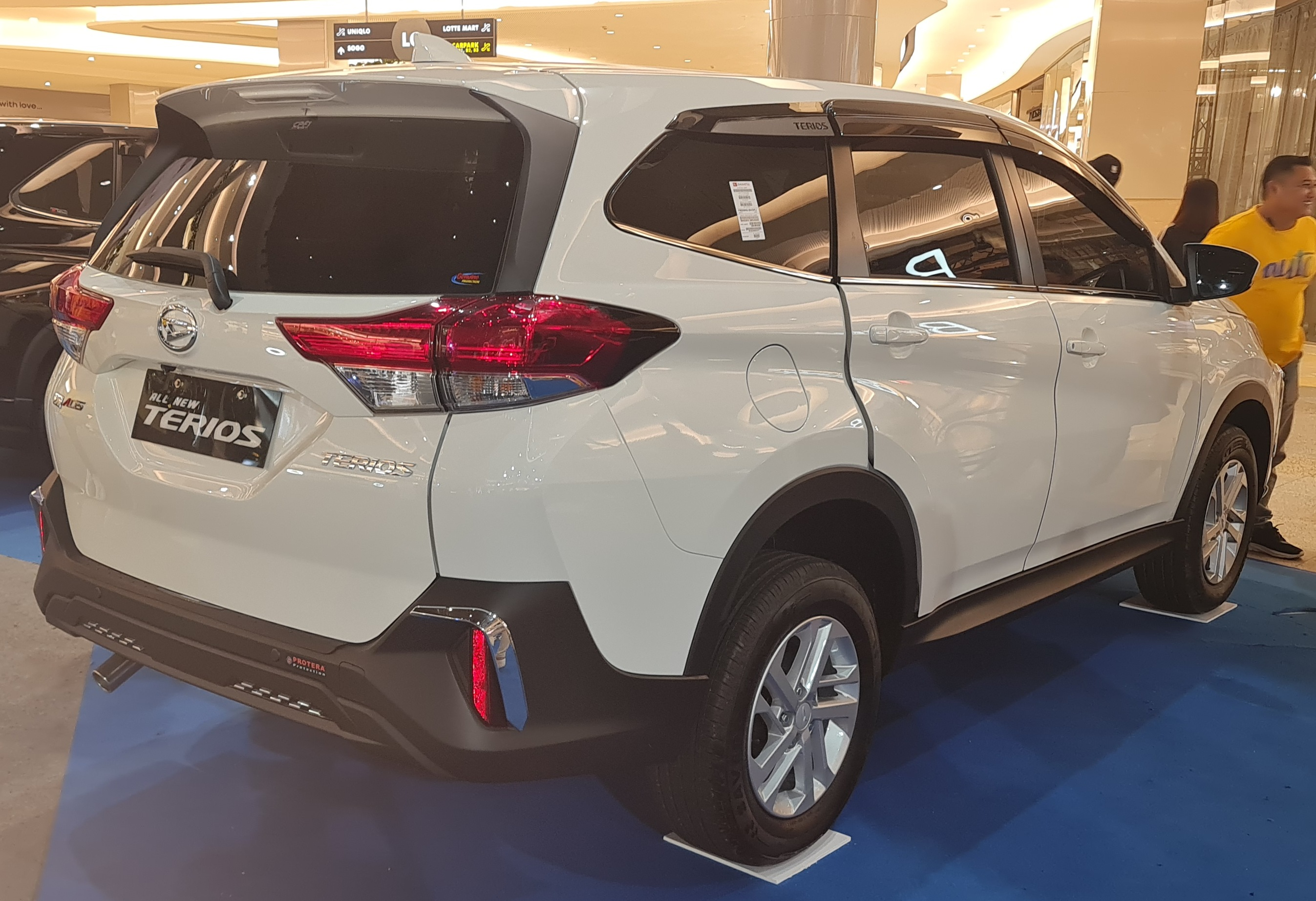
2023 Daihatsu Terios X ADS (F800RG; facelift, Indonesia)

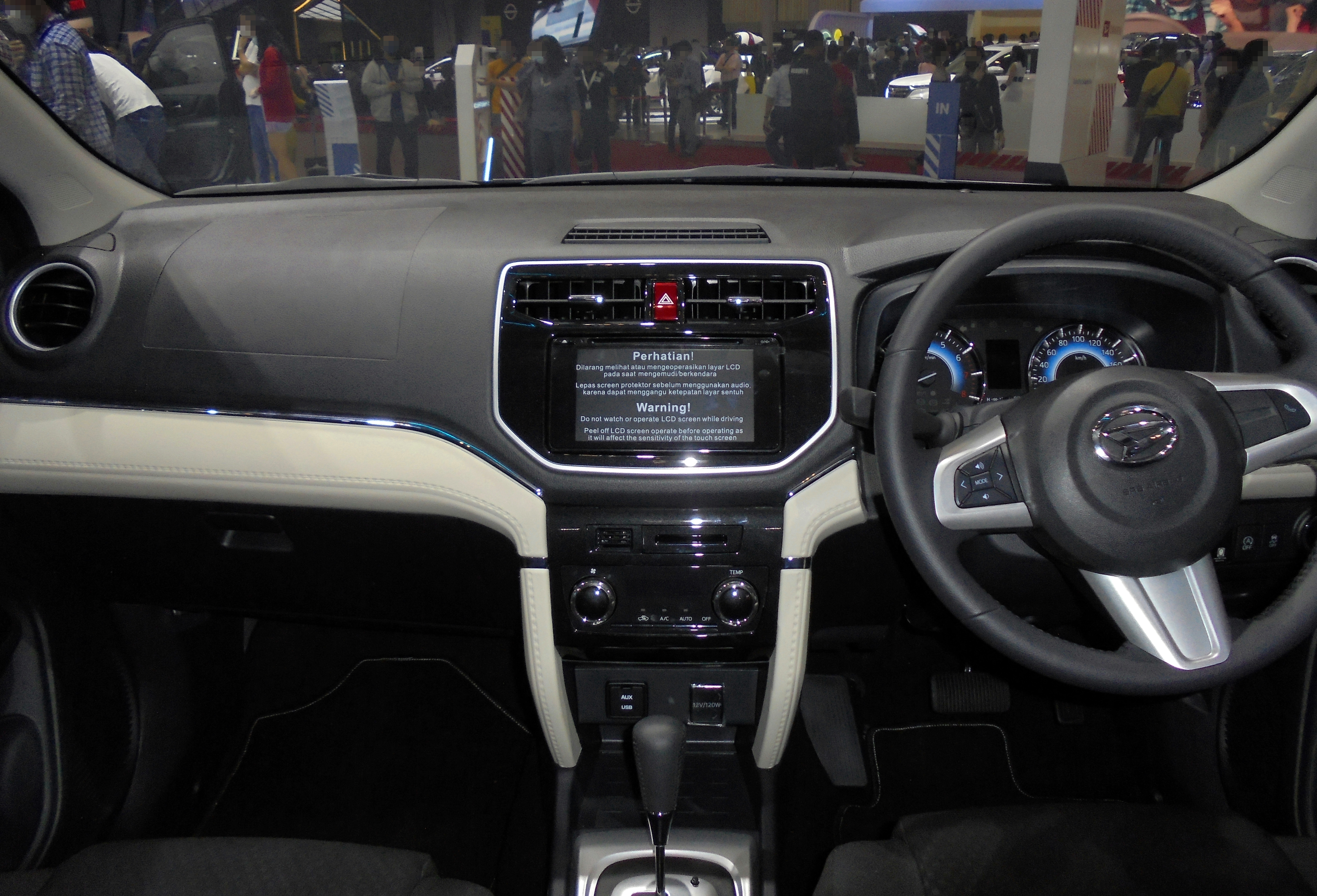
2021 Daihatsu Terios R Deluxe interior (Indonesia)

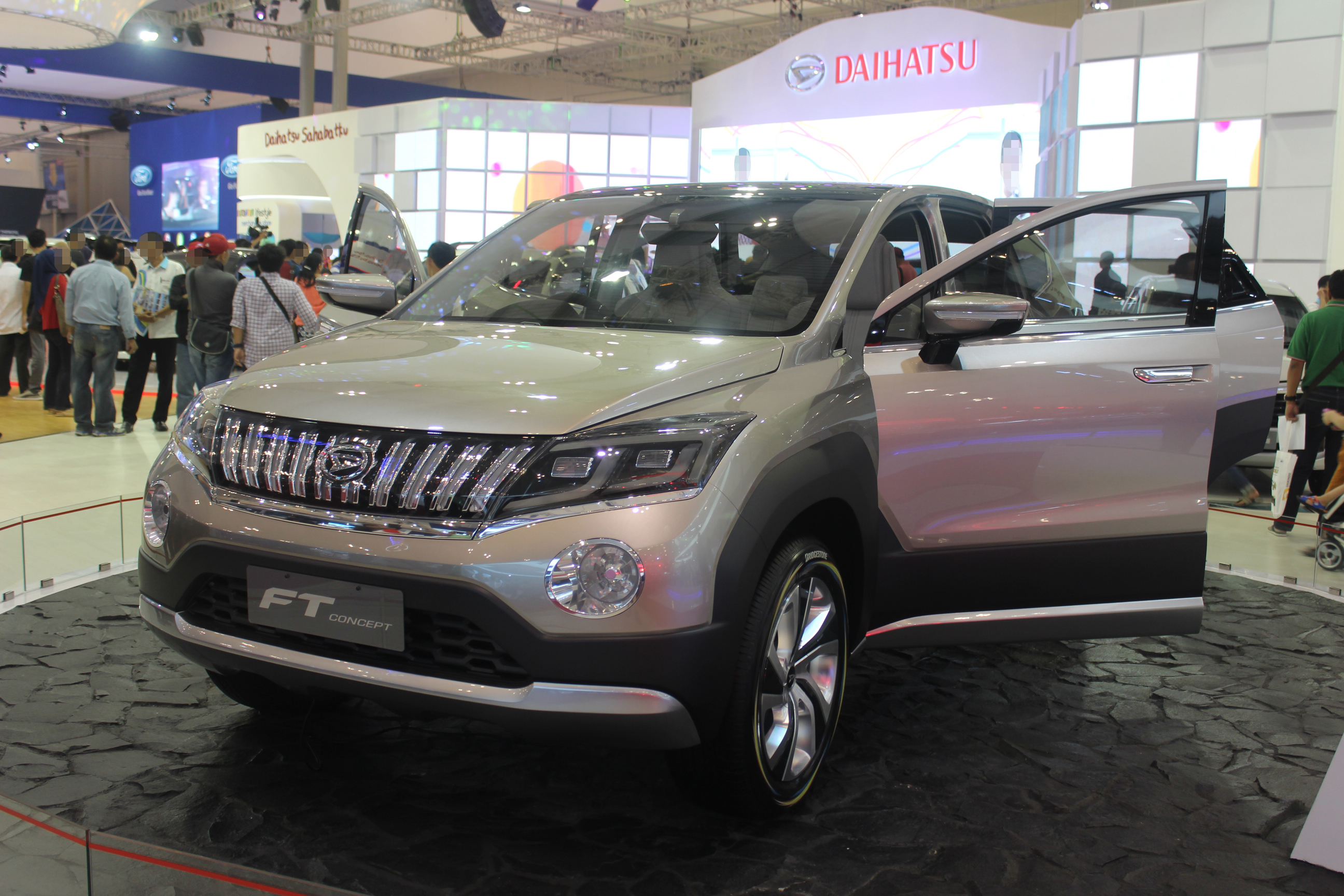
Daihatsu FT Concept

Toyota Rush

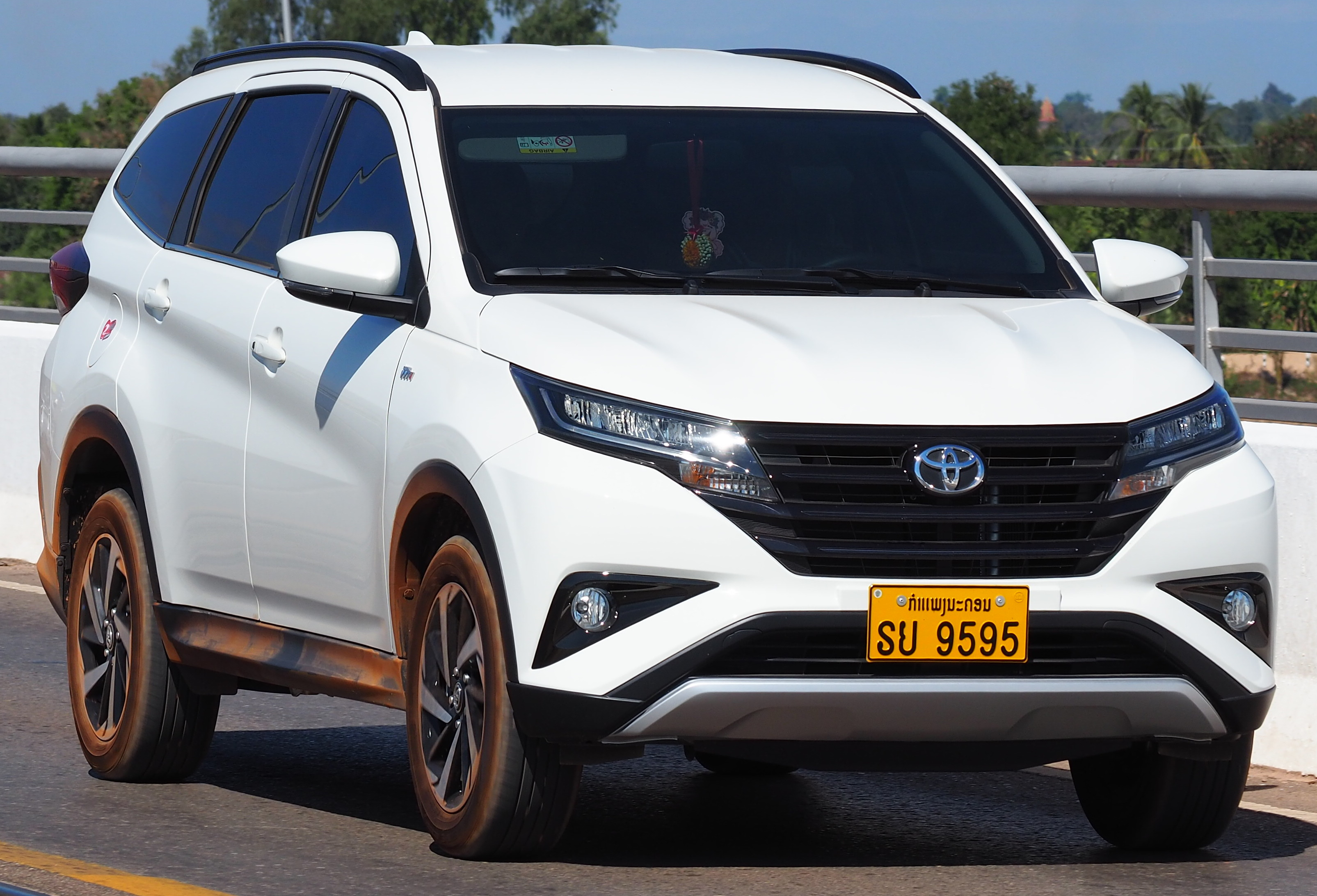
2018 Toyota Rush S (F800LE, Laos)

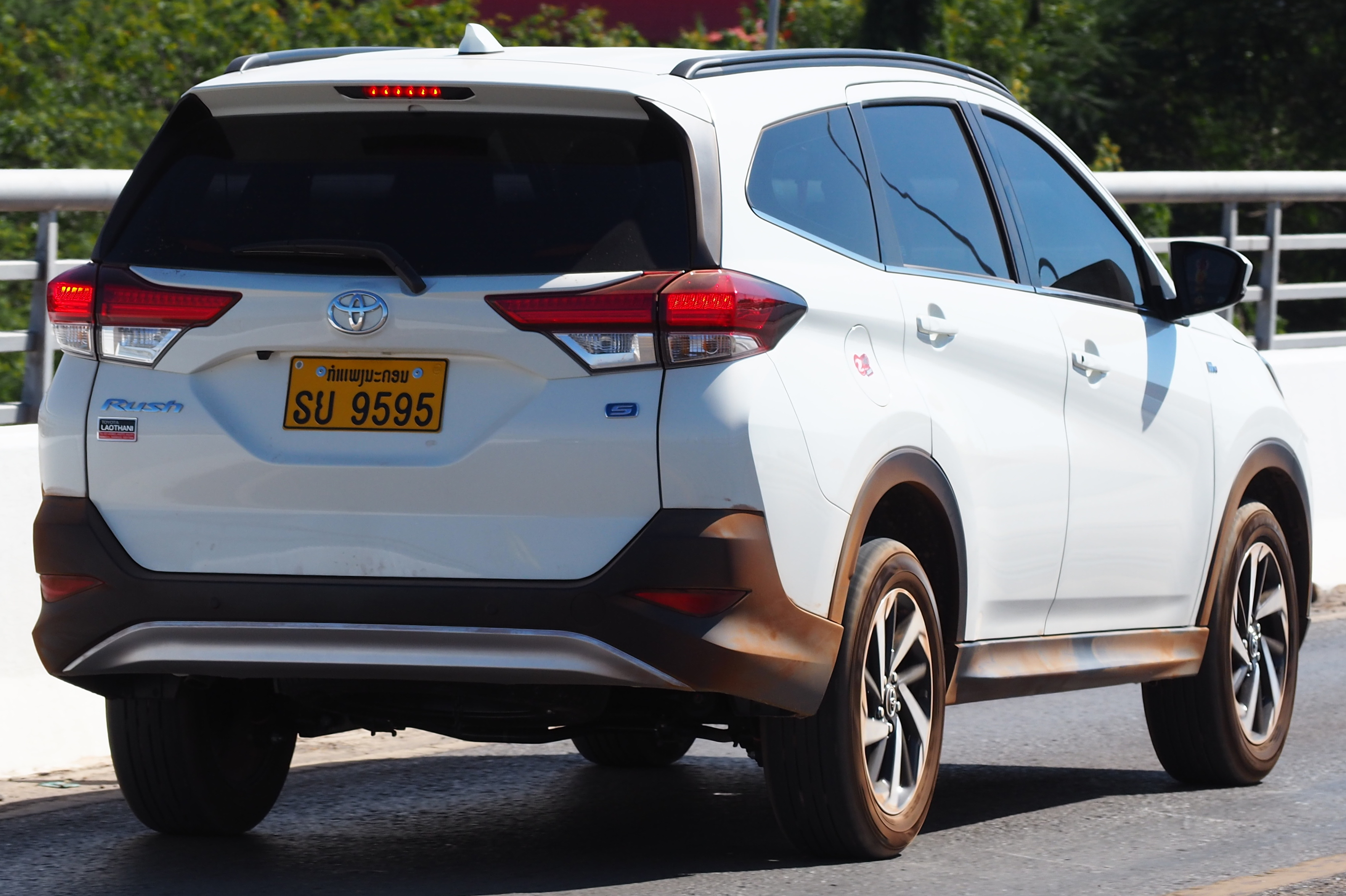
2018 Toyota Rush S (F800LE, Laos)

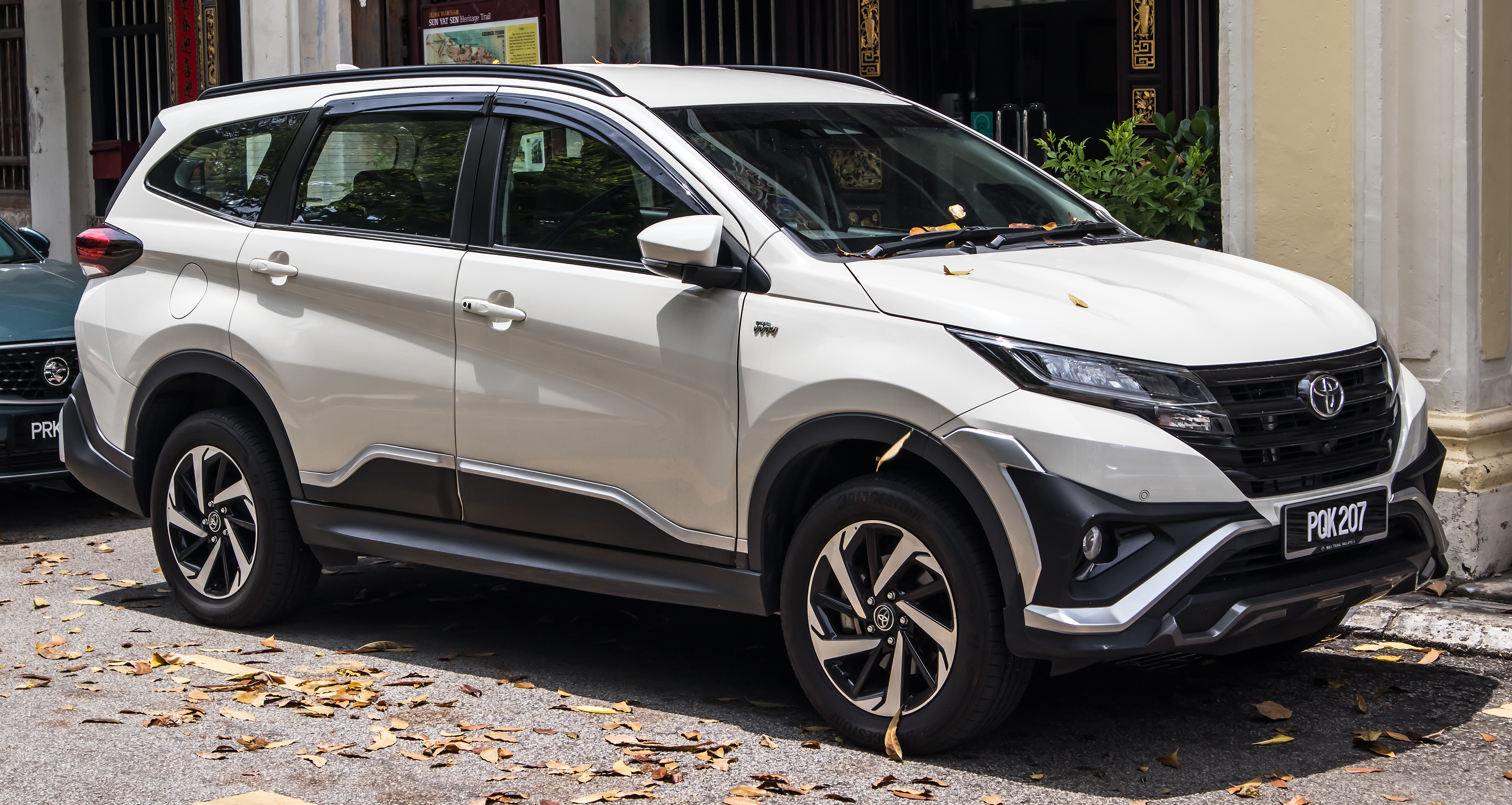
Toyota Rush S (F850RE, Malaysia)

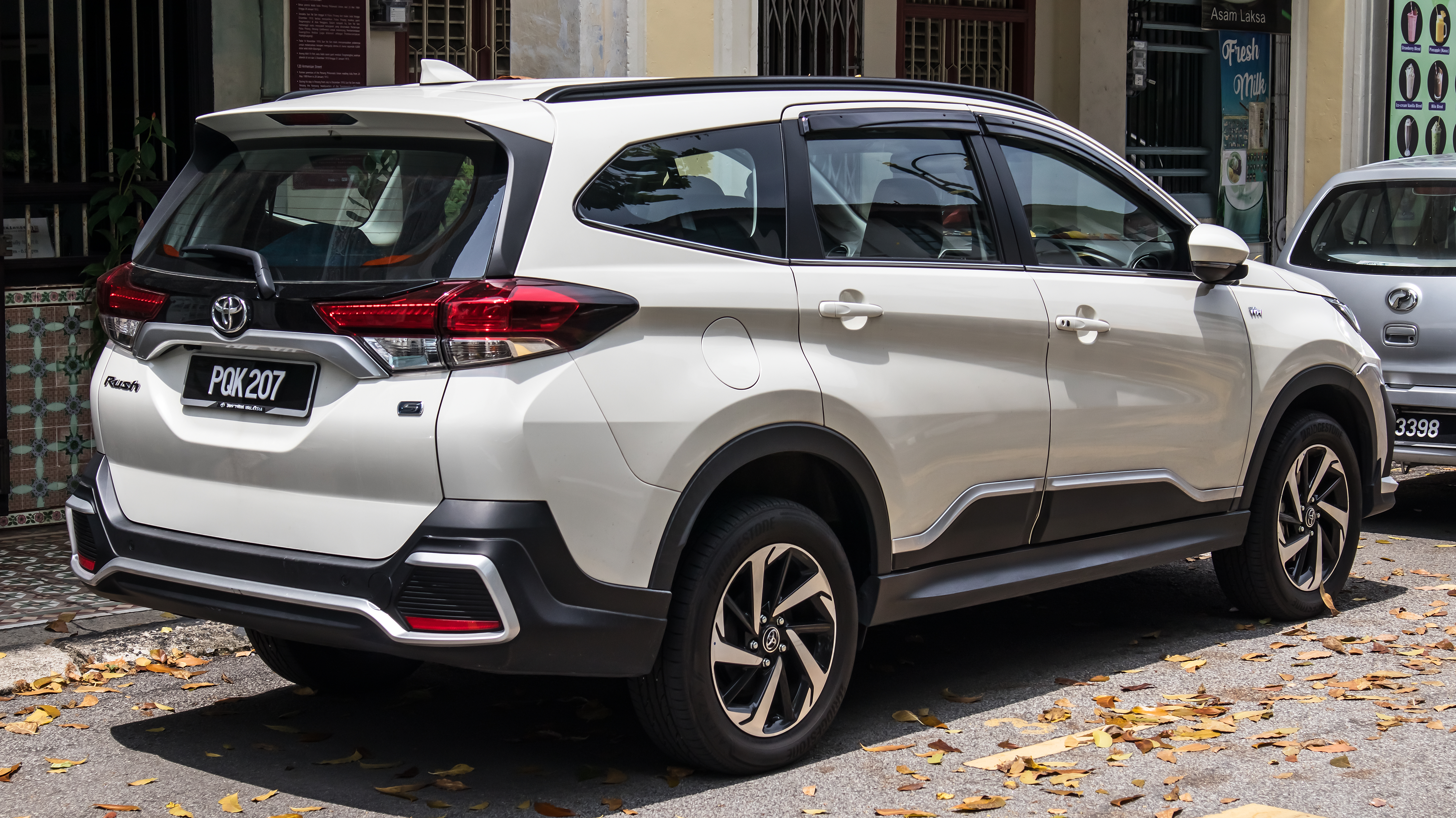
Toyota Rush S (F850RE, Malaysia)

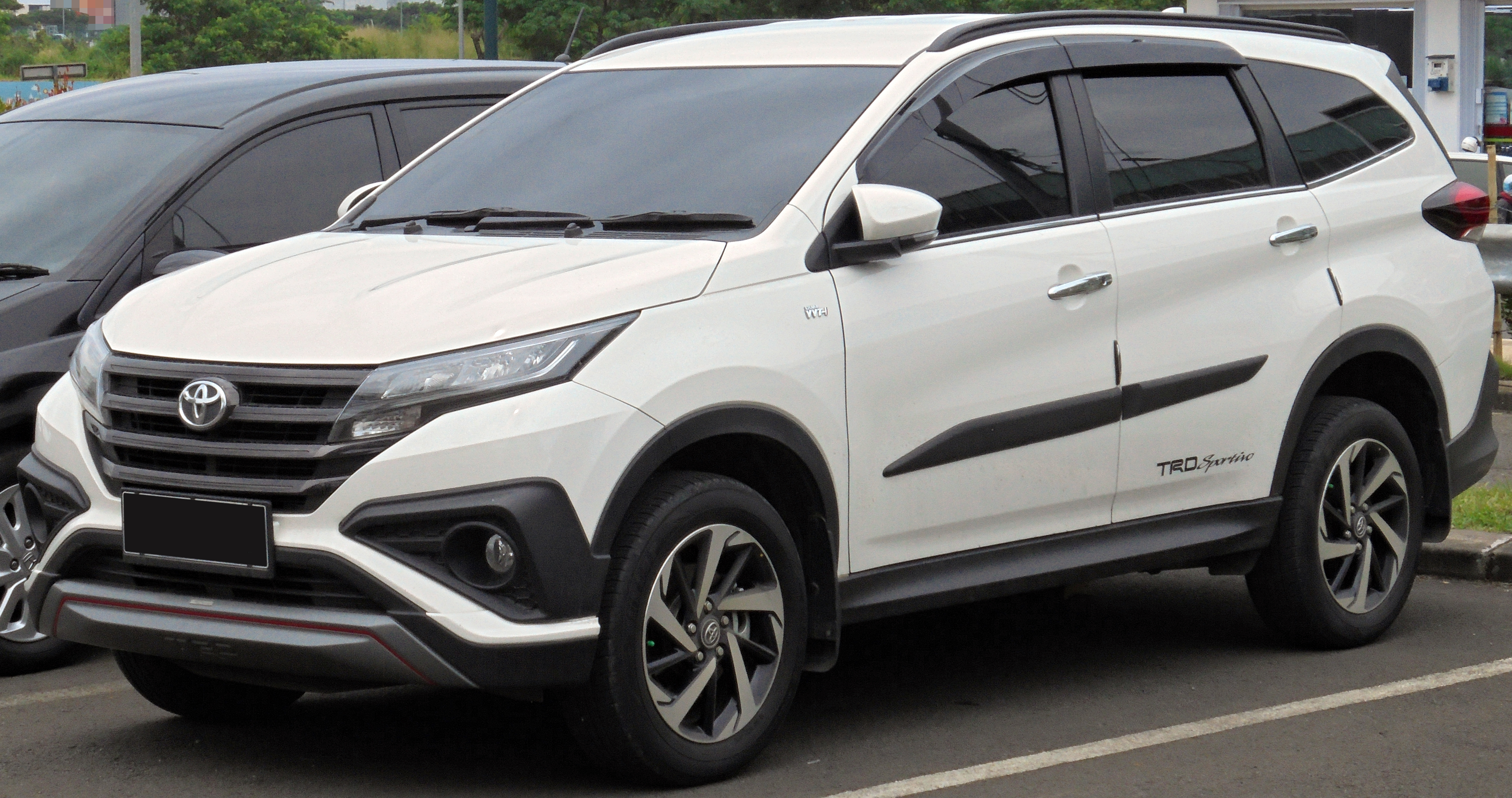
2018 Toyota Rush TRD Sportivo (F800RE, Indonesia)

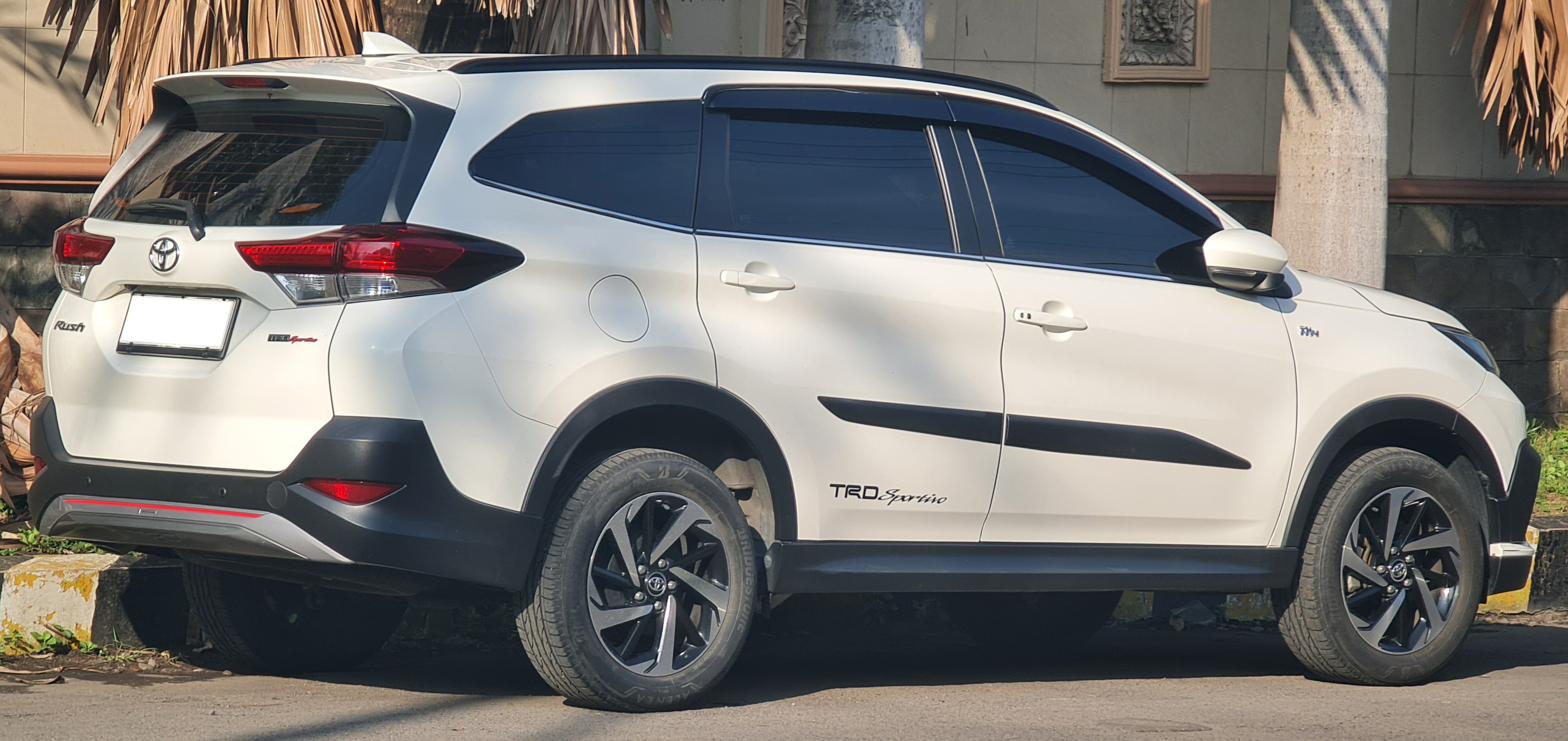
2018 Toyota Rush TRD Sportivo (F800RE, Indonesia)

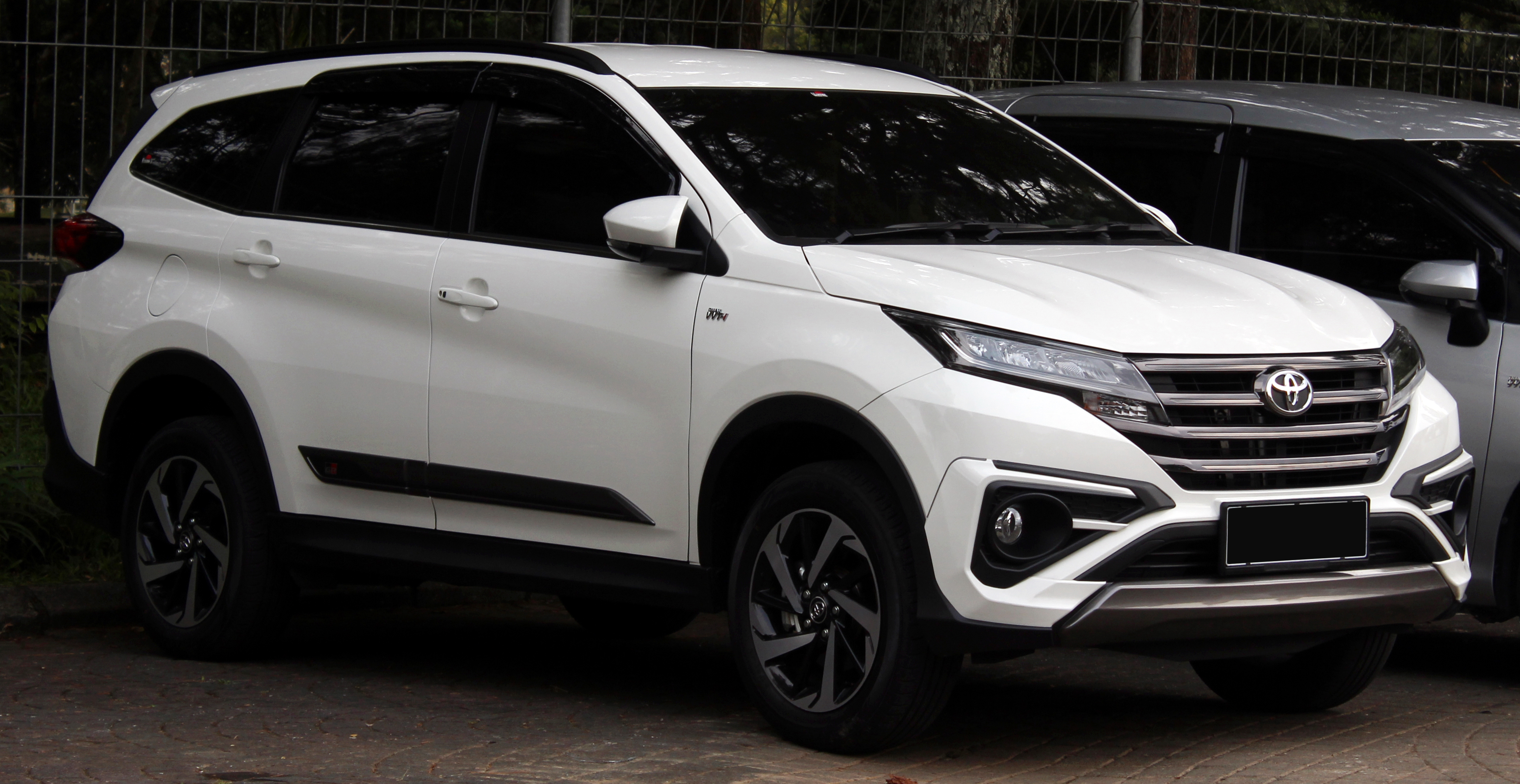
2021 Toyota Rush GR Sport (F800RE, Indonesia)

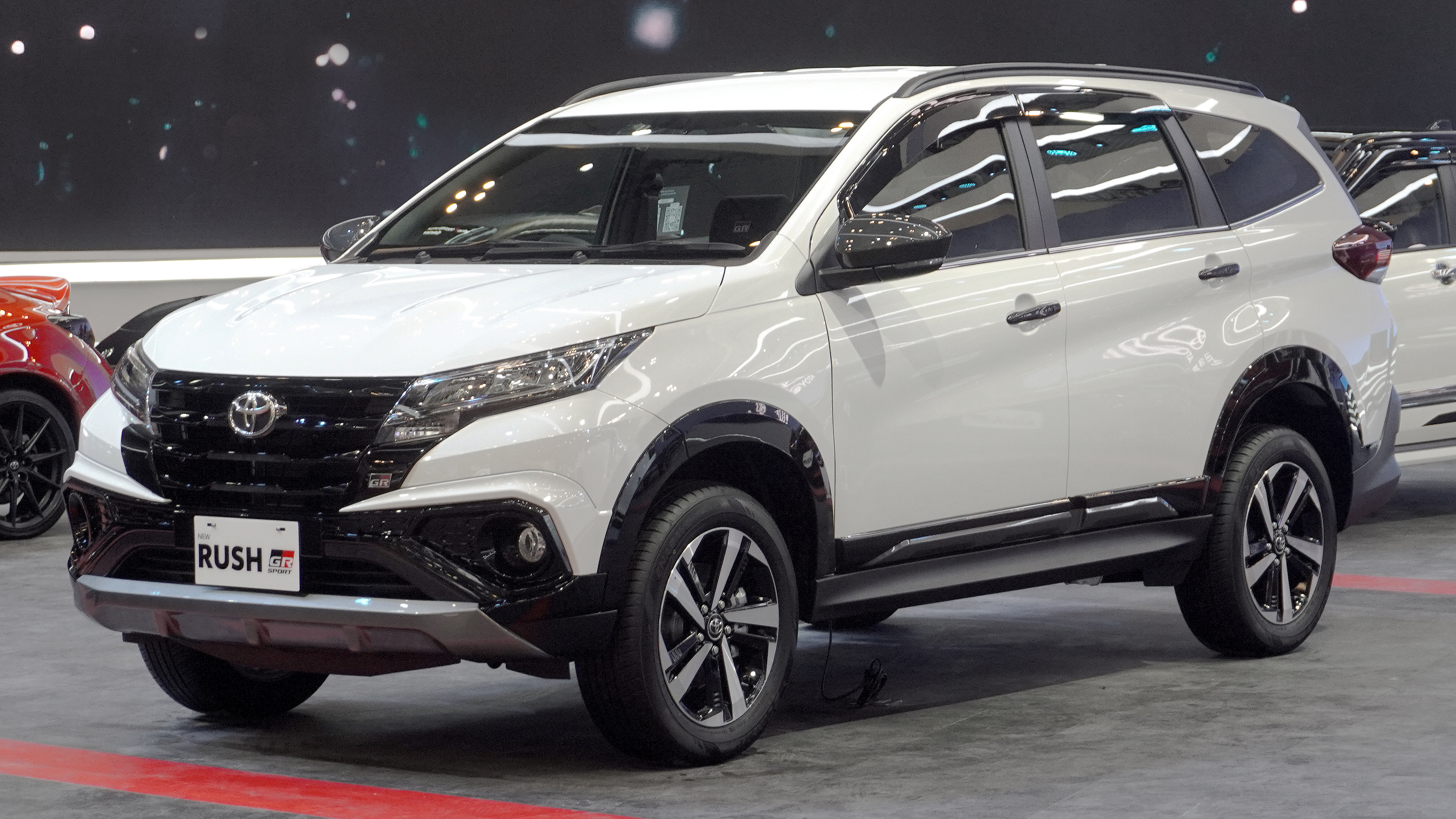
2024 Toyota Rush GR Sport (F800RE, Indonesia)

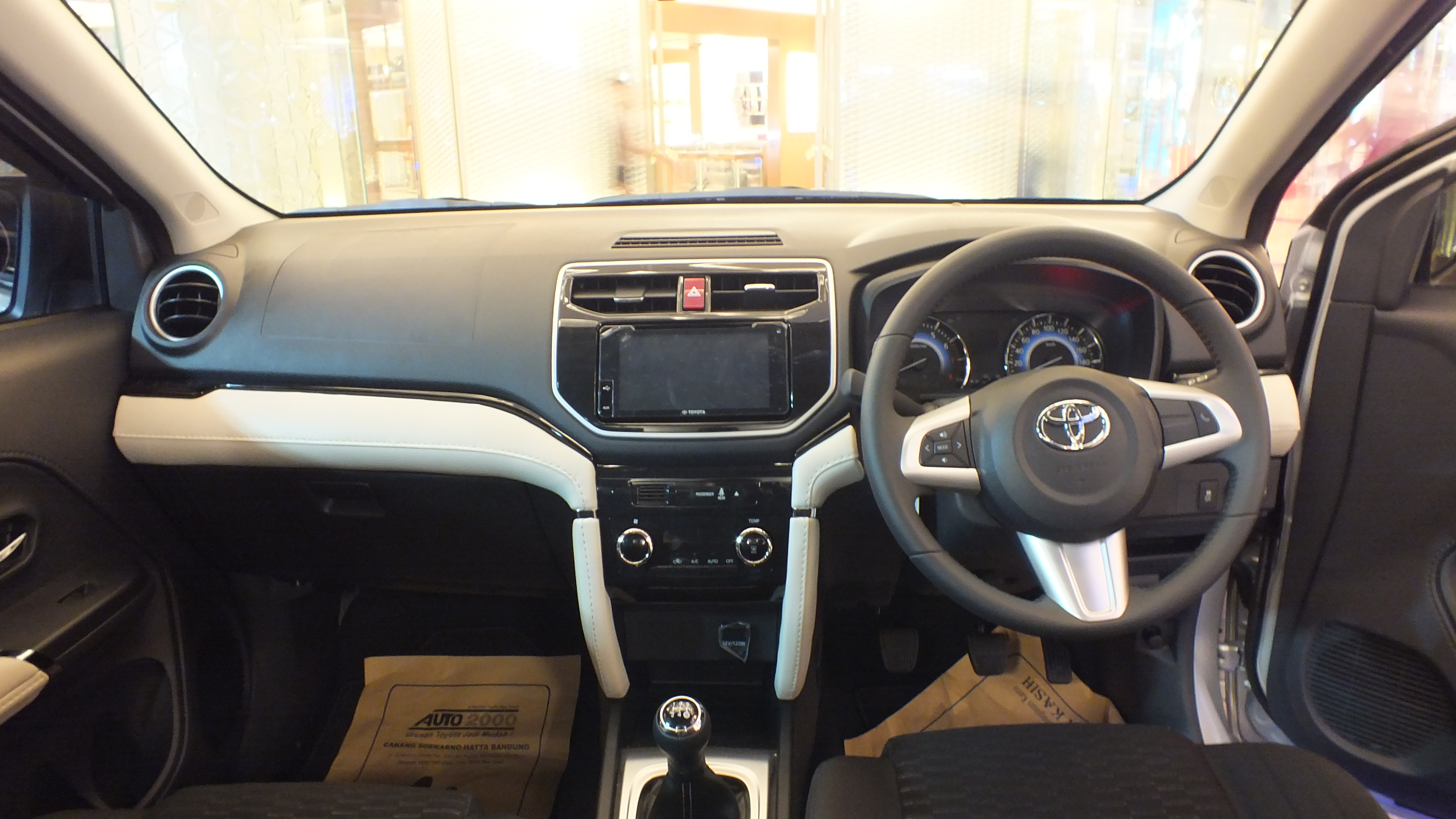
2018 Toyota Rush TRD Sportivo interior (Indonesia)

Perodua Aruz

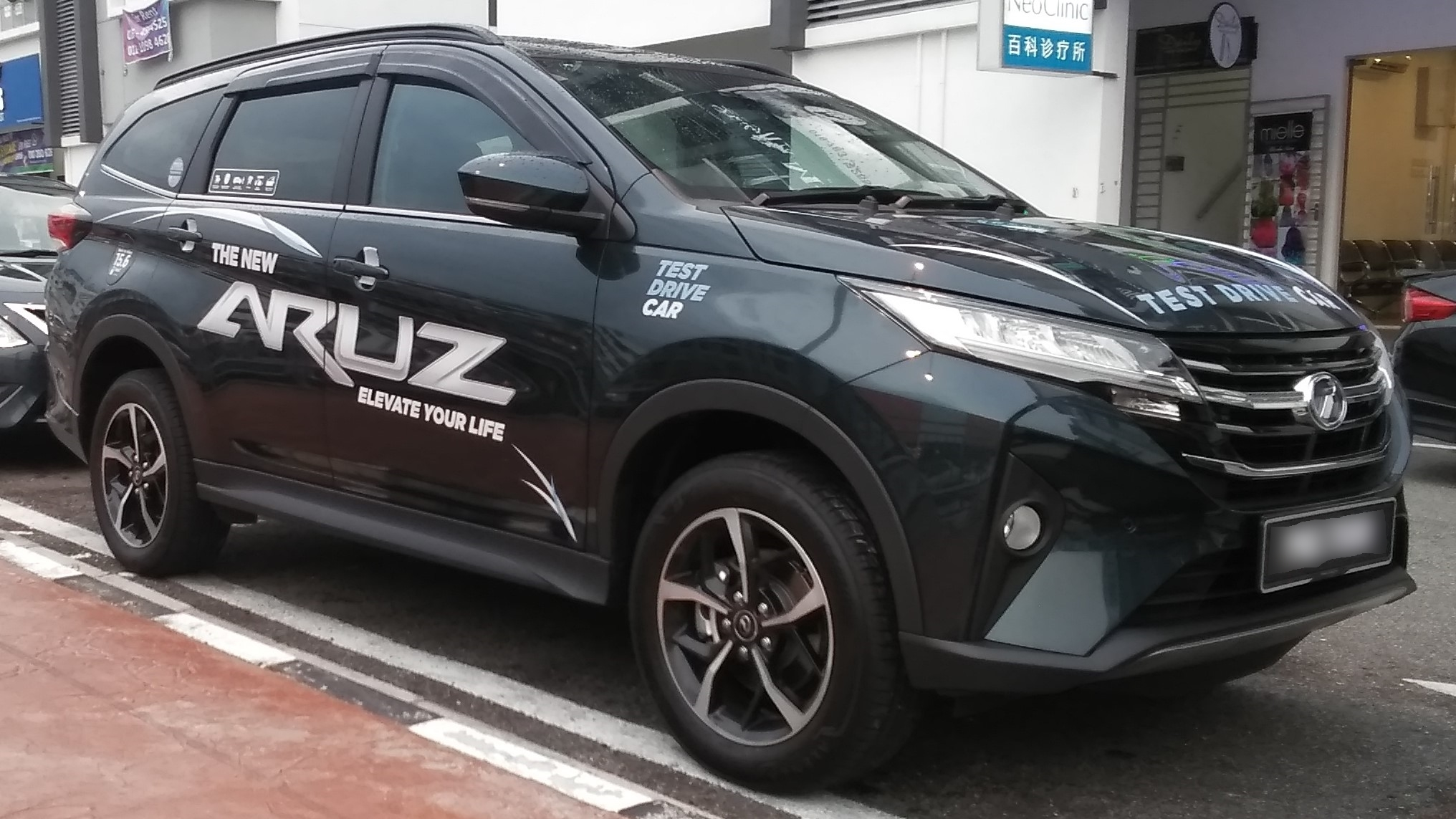
2019 Perodua Aruz AV (F850RG, Malaysia)

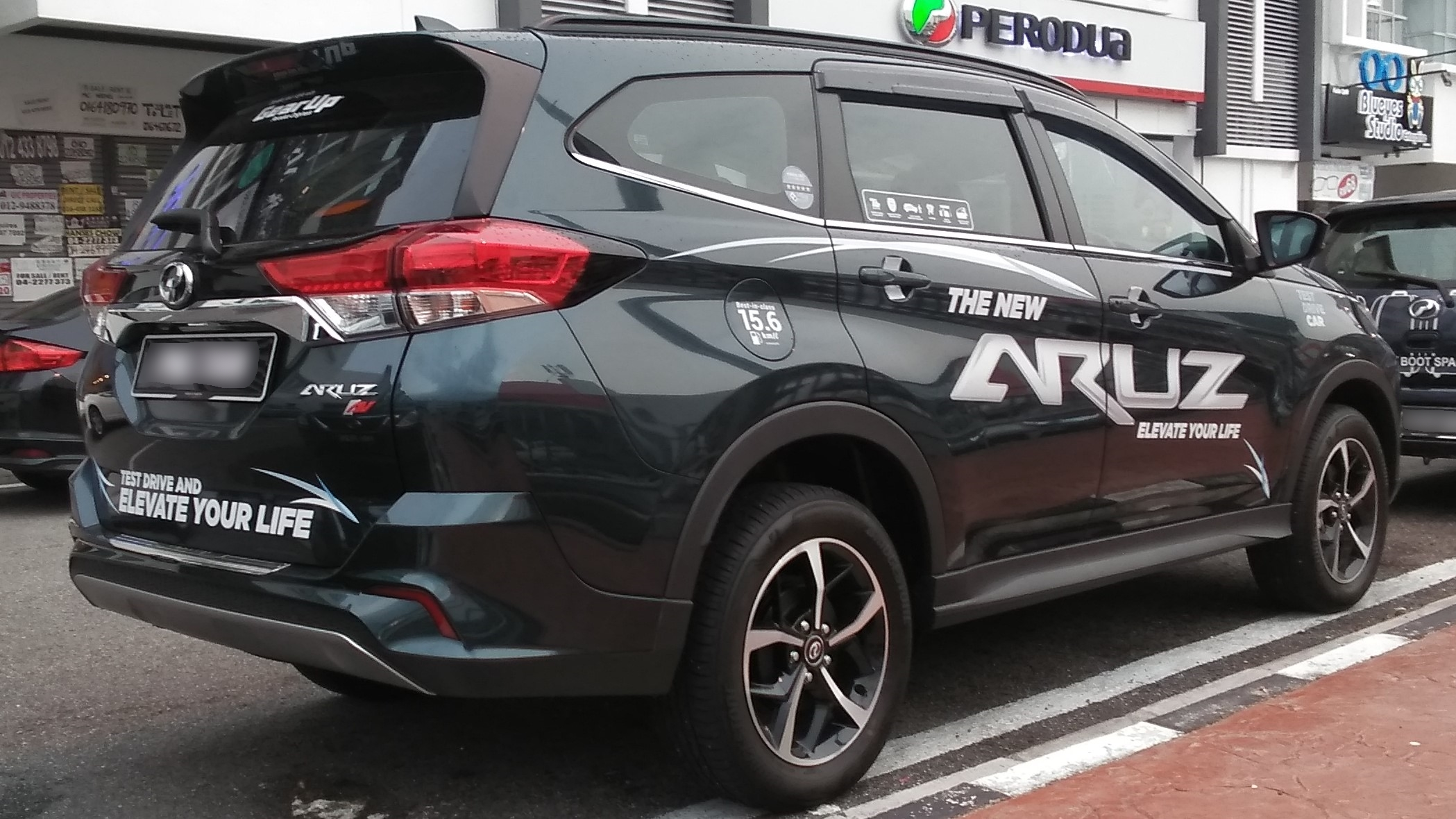
2019 Perodua Aruz AV (F850RG, Malaysia)

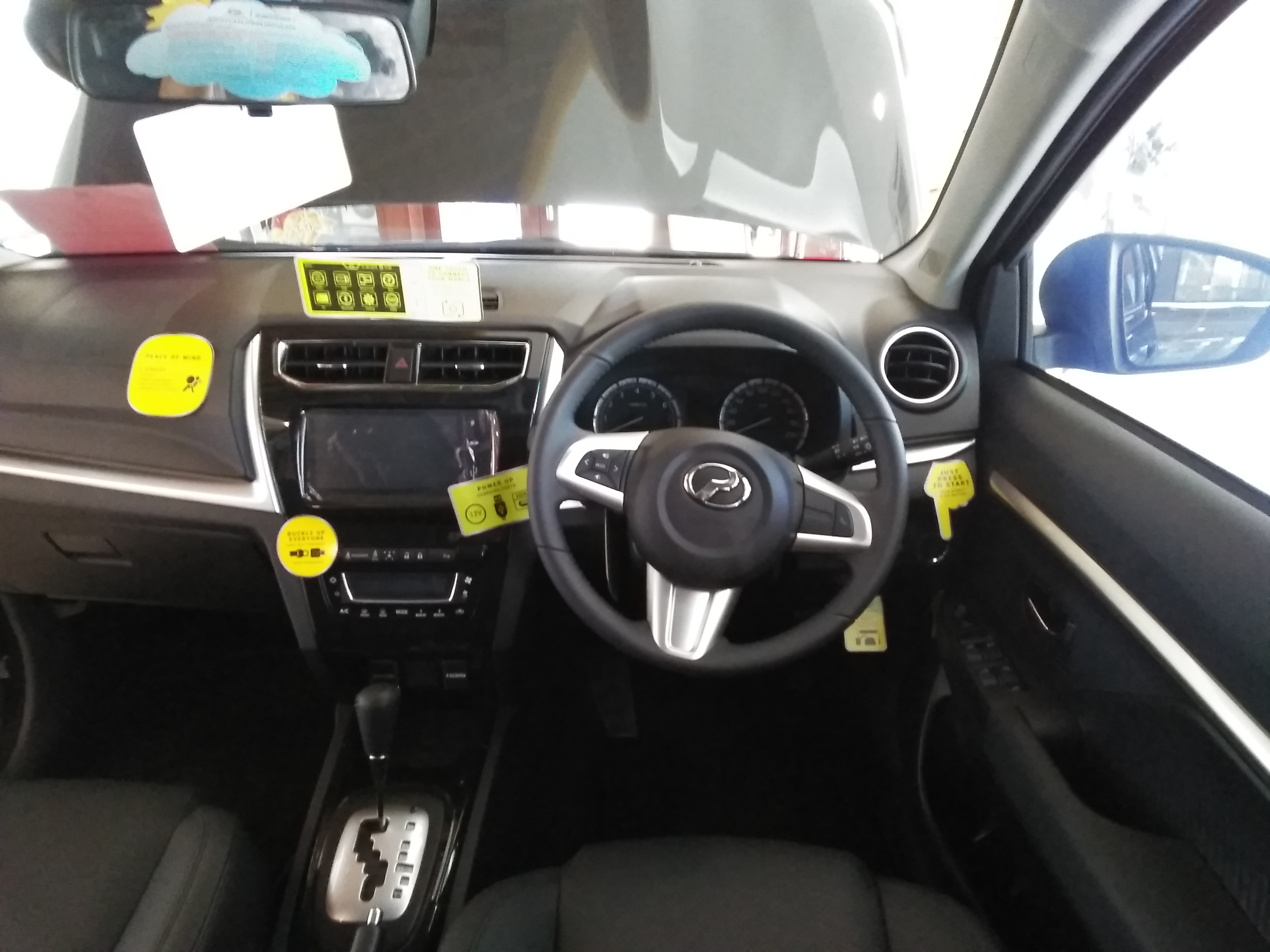
Interior

== Sales ==
Year	Indonesia			Malaysia (Note: Figures based on registration (Malaysia))				Philippines	Vietnam
Year	Daihatsu Taruna	Daihatsu Terios	Toyota Rush	Perodua Kembara	Perodua Nautica	Toyota Rush	Perodua Aruz	Toyota Rush	Toyota Rush
1999	6,270								
2000	18,514			12,325					
2001	9,032			13,859					
2002	8,096			10,882					
2003	6,969			9,550					
2004	4,697			6,124					
2005	3,761			4,298					
2006	1,450			2,261					
2007		15,650	14,126	783					
2008		14,807	15,309	28	475	5,985			
2009		13,149	12,965	3	19	3,024			
2010		16,483	18,420	0	0	2,473			
2011		22,416	25,012			2,488			
2012		23,949	34,033			1,800			
2013		25,674	35,044			1,148			
2014		18,774	29,609			669			
2015		13,375	26,848			250			
2016		14,238	24,371			76			
2017		11,338	20,039			32			
2018		31,453	53,145			0		10,760	765
2019		22,960	61,569			2,792	30,114	15,172	2,975
2020		12,362	29,361			2,449	22,494	10,194	4,241
2021		18,996	52,553			2,373	15,314	12,564	3,663
2022		24,825	44,991			2,586	19,624	14,871	
2023		24,226	39,340			1,069	21,324	9,437	
2024		17,800	31,753			0	16,522	4,658	
2025		15,157	29,805				17,827	3,111	
