= Luxio =

Luxio may refer to:

- Luxio (Pokémon), a Pokémon species
- Daihatsu Luxio, a minivan model designed by Daihatsu released in 2009
