= Daihatsu Zebra =

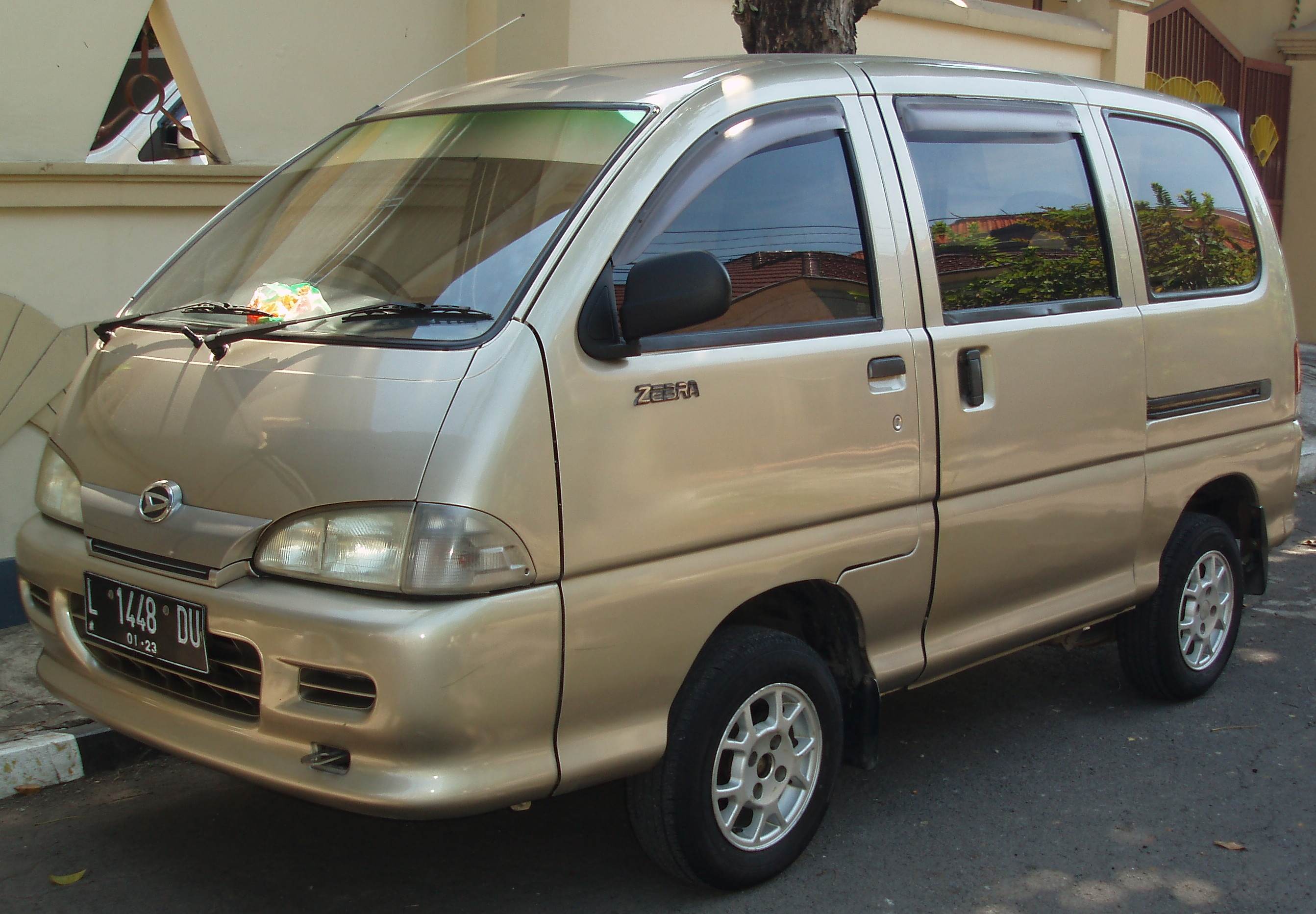
- 2005 Daihatsu Zebra ZL9 (S91, Indonesia)

Overview
- Manufacturer: Daihatsu
- Production: August 1986 – October 2007

Body and chassis
- Class: Light commercial vehicle
- Body style: 2-door pickup; 4 or 5-door van
- Layout: Front mid-engine, rear-wheel-drive
- Related: Daihatsu Hijet

Chronology
- Predecessor: Daihatsu Hijet (S65, S70)
- Successor: Daihatsu Gran Max; Daihatsu Luxio (upmarket variant)

The Daihatsu Zebra is a series of cab over vans and pickup trucks produced and sold by Japanese automaker Daihatsu's Indonesian subsidiary from 1986 to 2007.

== First generation (S88/S89; 1986) ==
First generation (S88/S89)
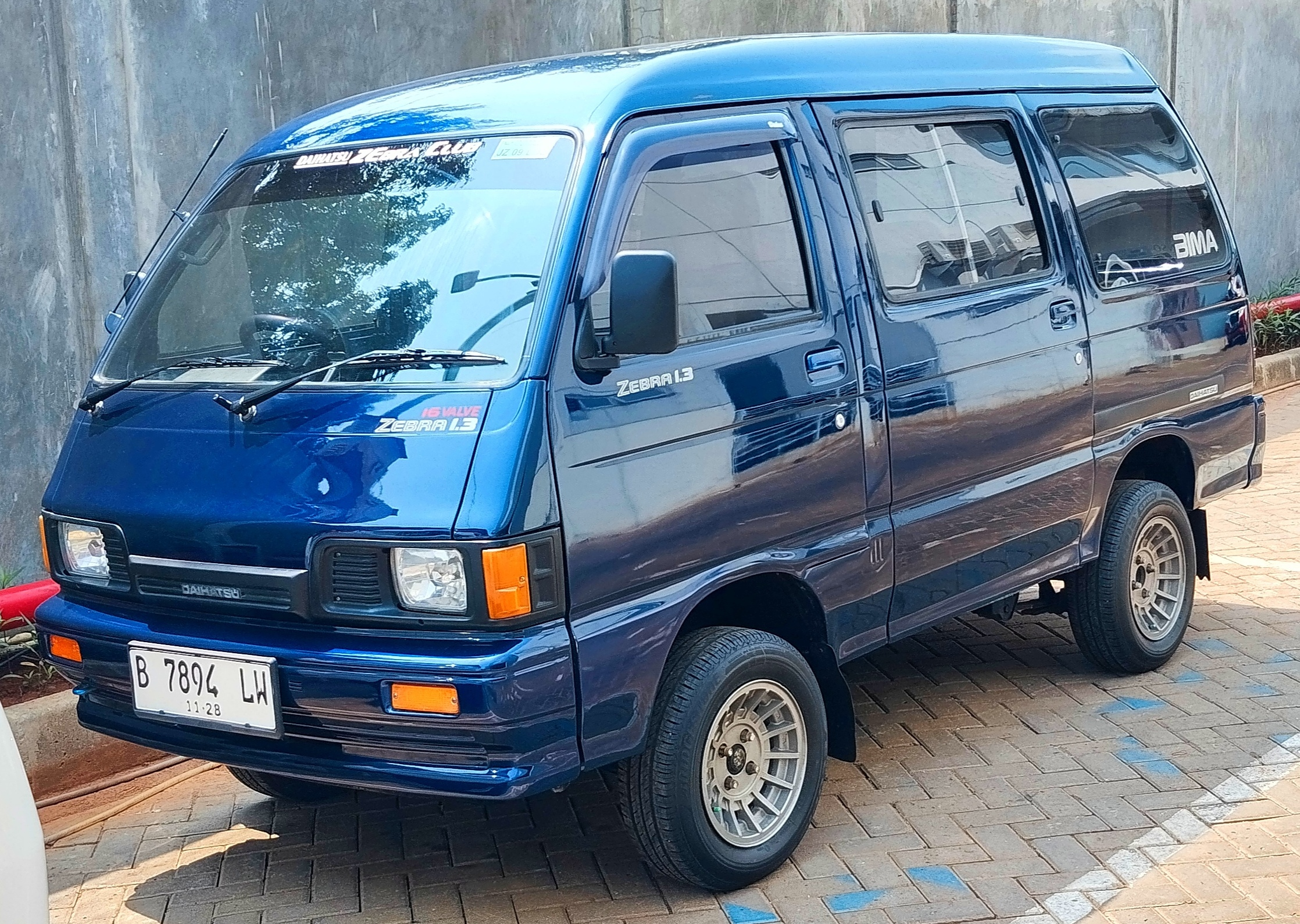
- Daihatsu Zebra 1.3 Astrea (first facelift)

Overview
- Also called: Daihatsu Hijet Zebra (1.0L van, Indonesia, 1986-1989); Daihatsu D130 Jumbo (truck, Indonesia)
- Production: August 1986 – October 1995 (pickup version until January 1996)
- Assembly: Indonesia: Sunter, Jakarta (ADM - Sunter Assembly Plant)

Body and chassis
- Related: Daihatsu Hijet (S80)

Powertrain
- Engine: 993 cc CB I3 (S88); 1295 cc HC-C I4 (S89)
- Transmission: 5-speed manual

Dimensions
- Wheelbase: 2,080 mm (81.9 in)
- Length: 3,835 mm (151.0 in) (van)
- Width: 1,560 mm (61.4 in)
- Height: 1,860 mm (73.2 in) (van)

The first-generation Daihatsu Zebra was launched on 1 August 1986 as an enlarged seventh-generation Daihatsu Hijet. It was equipped with a 53 PS (39 kW) 1.0-liter 3-cylinder CB engine from previous generation. In October 1989, this received a 1.3-liter 16-valve HC-C engine rather than the earlier one-liter unit, and sales doubled year-on-year. The 1298 cc unit produces 72 PS (53 kW) and was coupled to a four-speed manual transmission. The pickup truck version started using the "D130 Jumbo" badge, available until January 1996.

The initial model closely resembled the original Hijet, Despite using 2 square lights, the Zebra uses 4 square lights. In late 1992, the Zebra received the first facelift. The difference is visible in the rectangular lights and new grill.

There was a unique front-mid engine SUV-style based from Daihatsu Zebra 1.3 sold only in Indonesia between 1990–1994, known as "Shelby Patriot". This car shared almost everything from Zebra, except the body now has a 3-door SUV style similar to the Feroza and made from fiberglass.

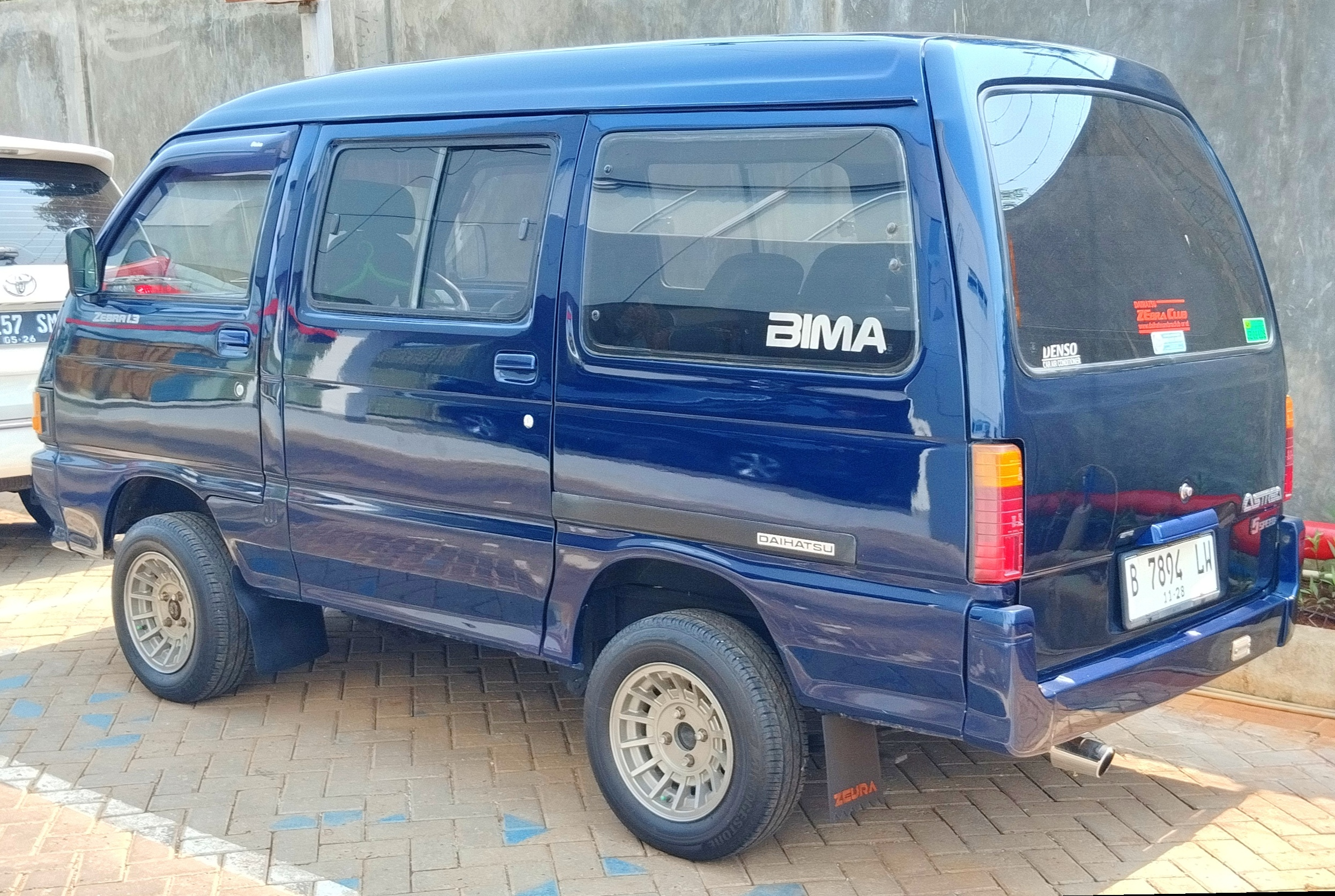
Daihatsu Zebra 1.3 Astrea rear view

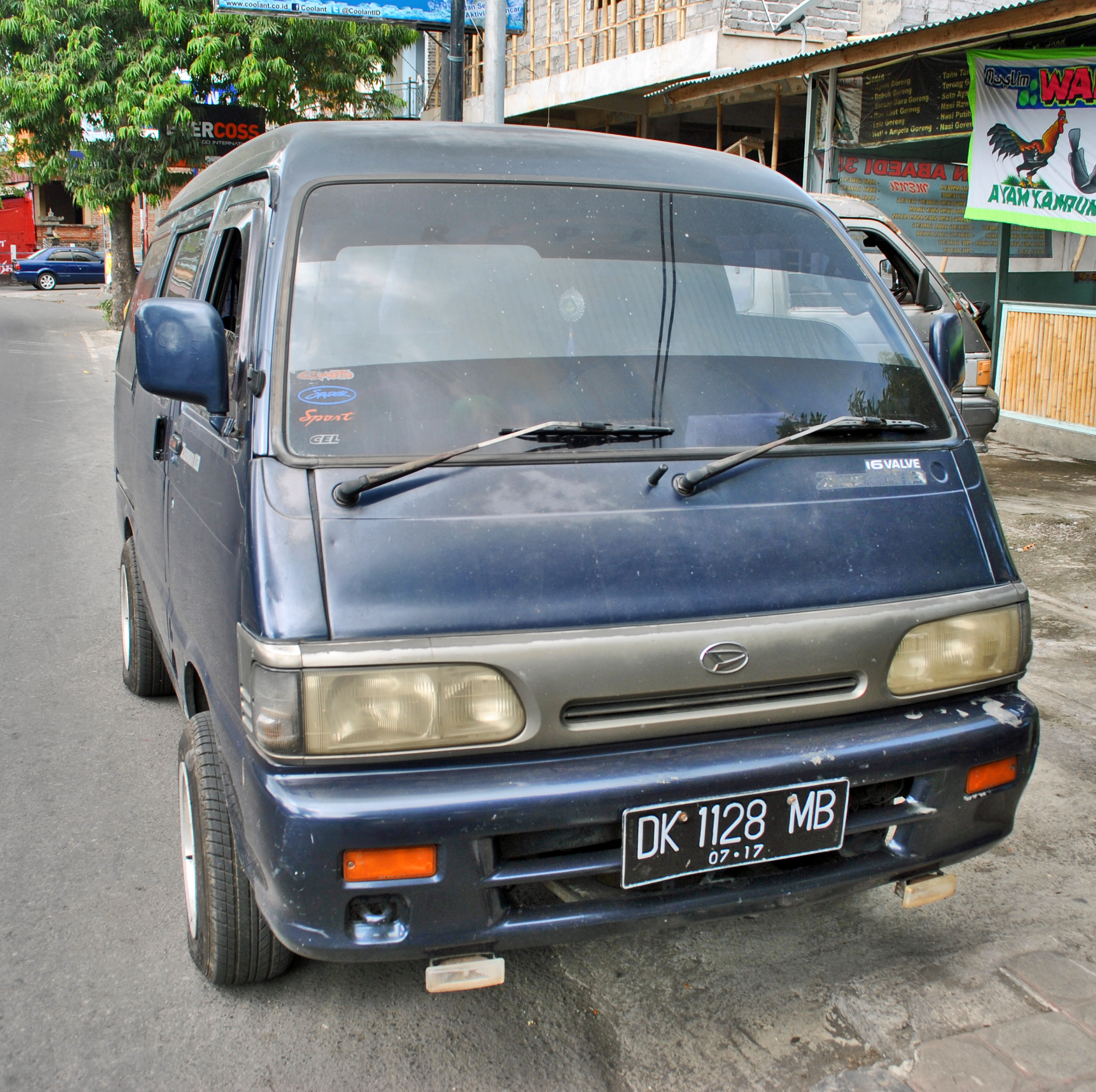
Daihatsu Zebra 1.3 Astrea Front (second facelift)

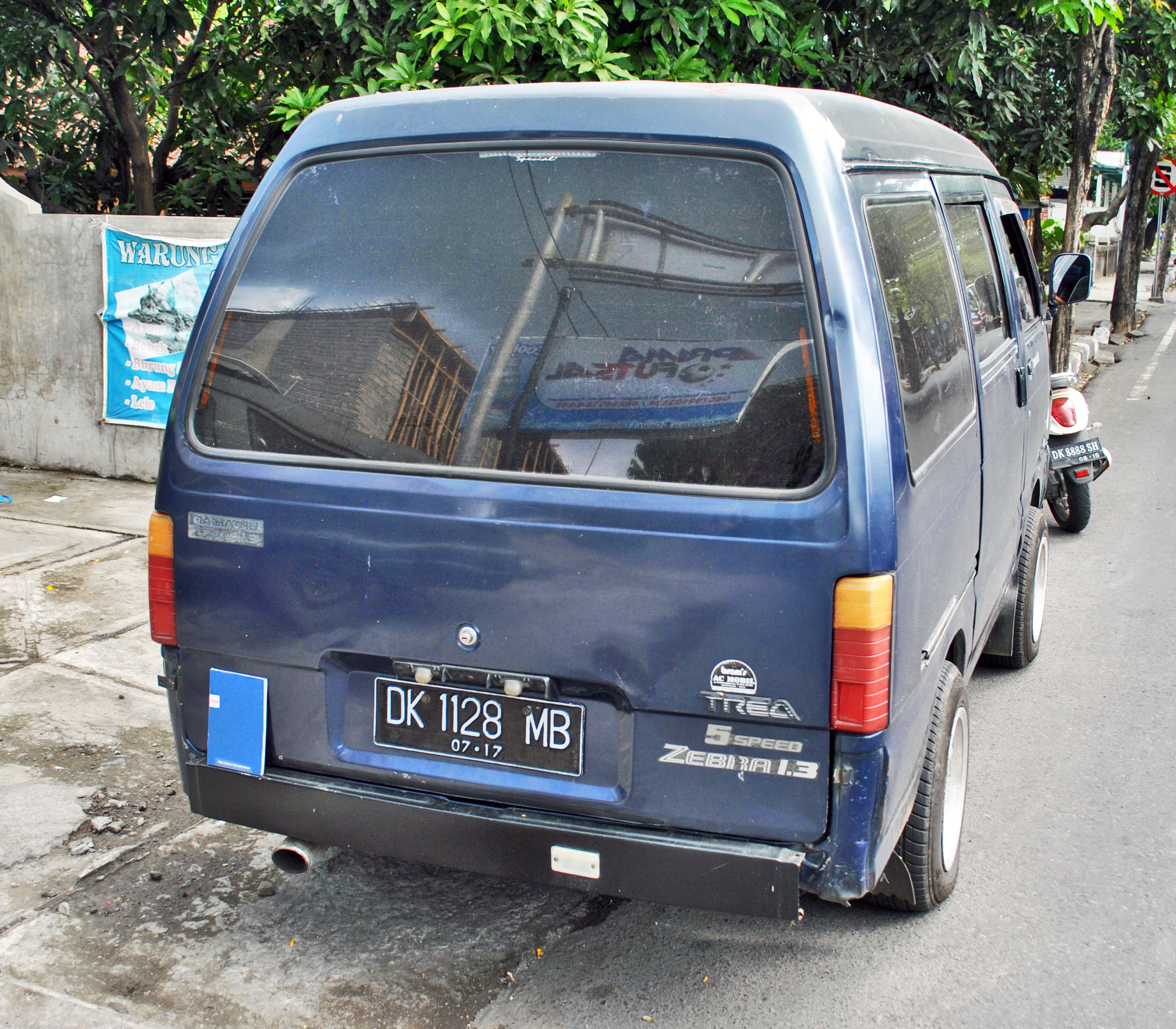
Daihatsu Zebra 1.3 Astrea Rear (second facelift)

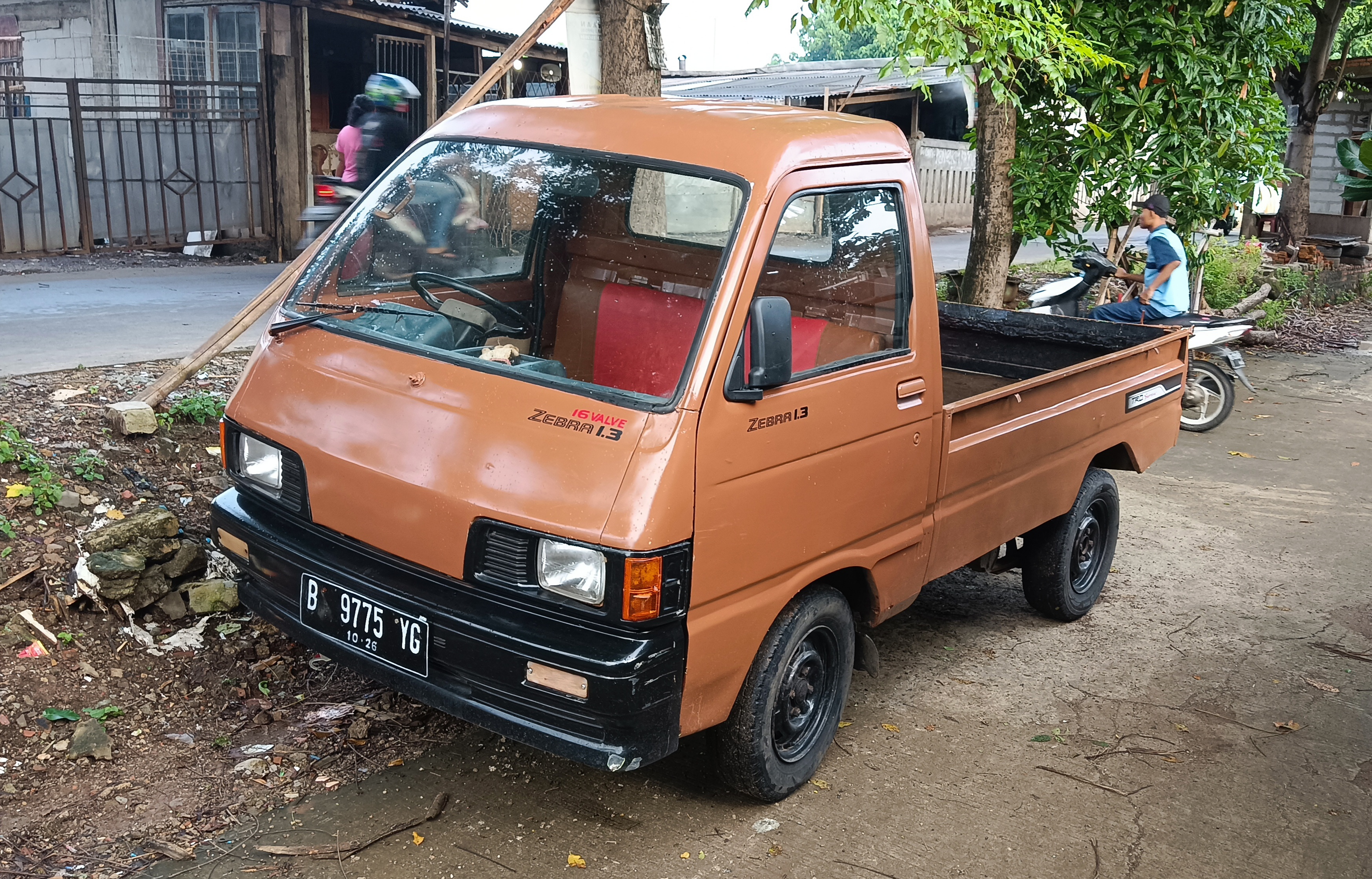
Daihatsu Zebra 1.3 Pickup Front (S89)

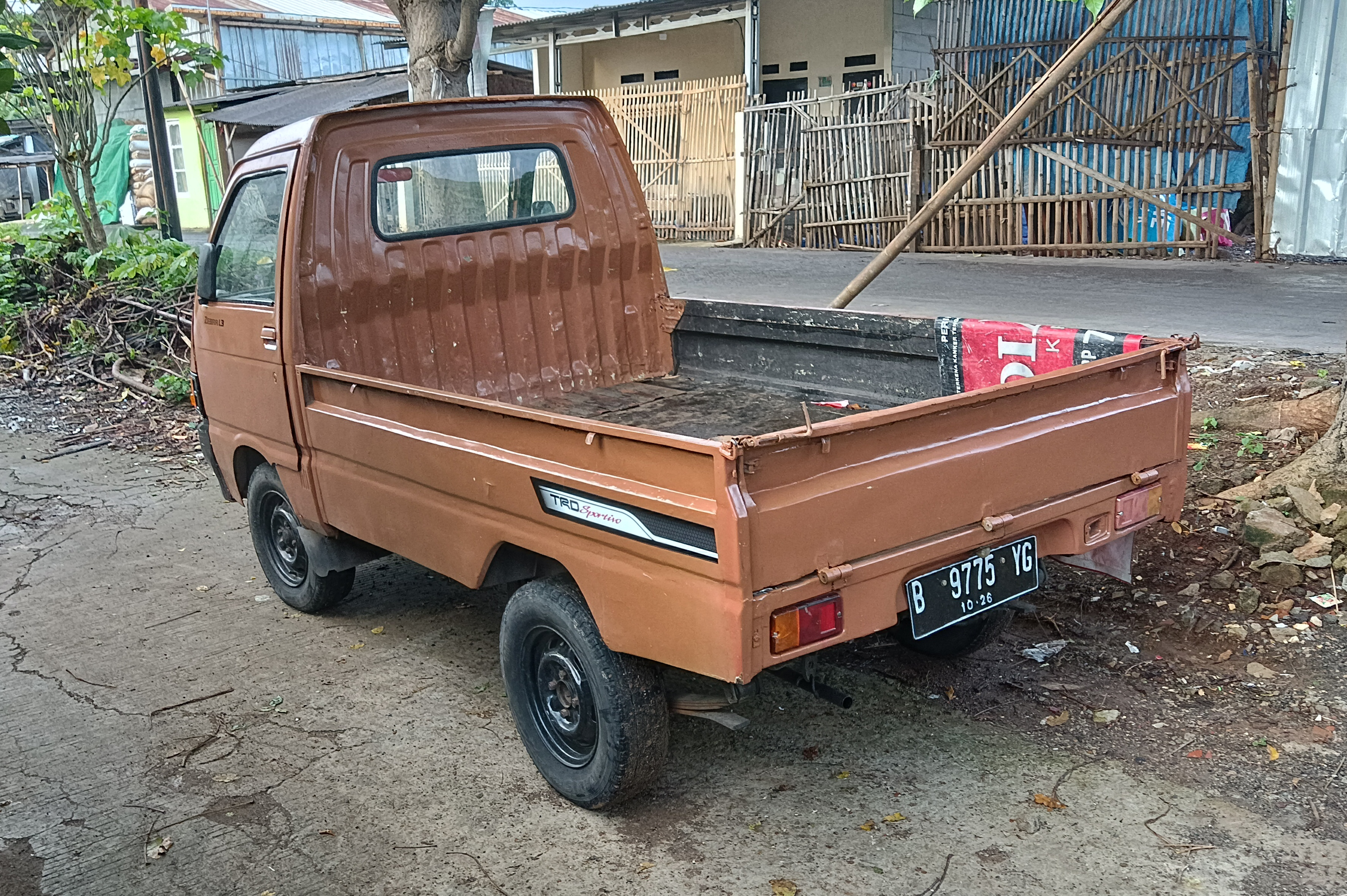
Daihatsu Zebra 1.3 Pickup Rear (S89)

== Second generation (S90/S91/S92; 1995) ==
Second generation (S90/S91/S92)
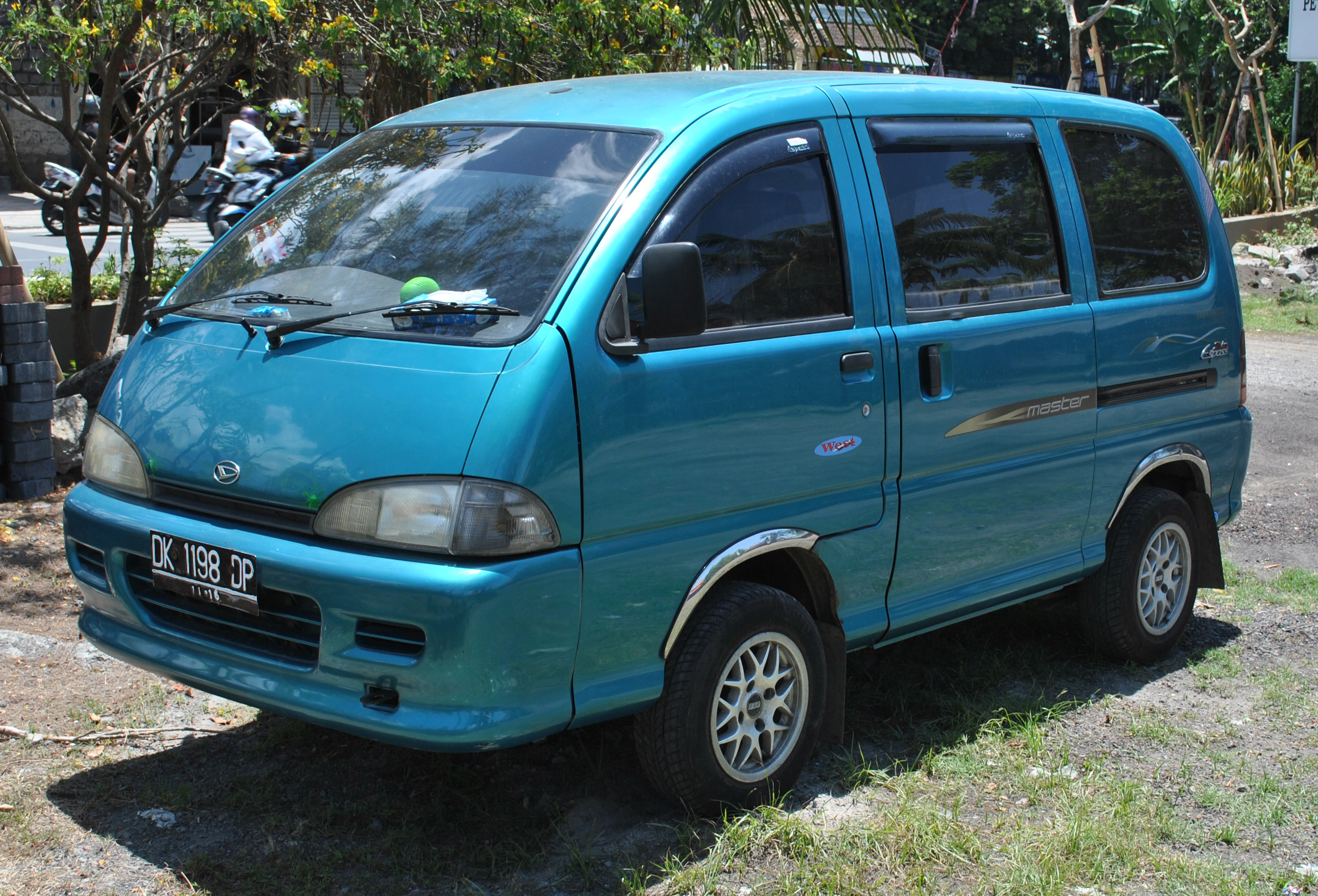
- Daihatsu Zebra Espass Supervan 1600 (S92, Indonesia)

Overview
- Manufacturer: Daihatsu; Perodua; SAIC-GM-Wuling
- Also called: Daihatsu D130 Jumbo (pickup truck, Indonesia) (1996-2000); Daihatsu Hijet Maxx (pickup truck, Malaysia); Daihatsu Citivan (Vietnam); Perodua Rusa (Malaysia); Wuling LZW6370/Little Tornado (China); ZAP Truck XL (United States); FAAM Ecomile; Daihatsu Hijet Jumbo (pickup truck, Vietnam)
- Production: April 1995 – October 2007
- Assembly: Indonesia: Sunter, Jakarta (ADM - Sunter Assembly Plant); Malaysia: Rawang, Selangor (Perodua Manufacturing Sdn. Bhd.); China: Liuzhou, Guangxi (SAIC-GM-Wuling)

Body and chassis
- Related: Daihatsu Hijet (S100)

Powertrain
- Engine: 1295 cc HC-C I4 (gasoline) (1994-2007); 1295 cc HC-E I4 (gasoline) (2007); 1498 cc HE-C I4 (gasoline) (2004-2007); 1498 cc HE-E I4 (gasoline) (2002-2004, 2007); 1589 cc HD-C I4 (gasoline) (1994-2002); 1589 cc HD-E I4 (gasoline) (2001-2002)
- Transmission: 5-speed manual

Dimensions
- Wheelbase: 2,070–2,080 mm (81.5–81.9 in)
- Length: 3,835–3,875 mm (151.0–152.6 in) (van); 3,915 mm (154.1 in) (standard pickup); 4,052 mm (159.5 in) (Extra Jumbo 3 Way pickup)
- Width: 1,560 mm (61.4 in) (van, standard pickup); 1,770 mm (69.7 in) (Extra Jumbo 3 Way pickup)
- Height: 1,825 mm (71.9 in) (standard pickup); 1,860 mm (73.2 in) (van); 1,892 mm (74.5 in) (Extra Jumbo 3 Way pickup)
- Curb weight: 805–900 kg (1,775–1,984 lb) (pickup); 990–1,045 kg (2,183–2,304 lb) (van)

The second-generation Daihatsu Zebra van, known as the Zebra Espass was based on the eighth-generation Hijet and introduced in April 1995. The pickup truck version retained the D130 Jumbo badge, available from January 1996. It was also produced and sold in Malaysia as the Perodua Rusa from 1996. It has a completely rounded, aerodynamic styling. When it was first introduced, it was powered by the same engine as the seventh generation Hijet-based Zebra, the 1.3-liter 16-valve HC-C engine with carburetor. In December 1996, the Espass Supervan was launched with the 1.6-liter 16-valve HD-C engine (later used on the Taruna), standard air conditioners, audio system with tape and racing wheels.

In 2000, the Zebra Espass badge for the van version and the D130 Jumbo badge for the pickup truck version were replaced by the new Zebra badge and the van version was offered in five trim levels: Blind Van, ZT (with swing-out center side doors, swing-out rear door and face-to-face rear seats instead of sliding doors, lift-up tailgate and front-facing rear seat), ZL, ZX and ZSX. It is referred to as the Neo Zebra. The Blind Van, ZT and ZL retained the previous 1.3-liter engine with carburetor from the previous model. While the ZX and ZSX which replaced the Espass Supervan retained the 1.6-liter engine with carburetor, from 2001, the 1.6-liter 16-valve HD-E engine with electronic fuel injection (EFI) was also available as an option. Both the 1.6-liter engines with carburetor and EFI were later replaced in January 2002 by the 1.5-liter 16-valve HE-E engine with EFI (also used on the Taruna) due to changes in excise tax structure. Since then, the ZT van was discontinued. In 2003, the van received the same red and white taillights with ornaments and rear license plate holder as used on the Perodua Rusa, and added two new van variants: ZL9 and ZL Xtra. The ZL9 van variant featured swing-out rear door and face-to-face rear seats instead of lift-up tailgate and front-facing rear seat while retained the sliding doors.

The Zebra was refreshed in late 2004 and is referred to as the Zebra Master, and features an ornament on top of the grille with the larger and bolder chrome Daihatsu symbol emblem used on the recent Daihatsu vehicles, and added two new face-to-face van variants: ZL Xtra9 and ZX9 (replaced the regular ZX EFI trim). The ZSX van received a chrome ornament and the chrome Daihatsu symbol emblem on the steering wheel. The ZX and ZSX vans with the 1.5-liter engine with EFI was replaced by the ZX9 and ZSX vans with the 1.5-liter 16-valve HE-C engine with carburetor. The pickup trucks with the same 1.5-liter engine with carburetor as the ZX9 and ZSX vans were made available. In 2007, the pickup trucks, Blind Van, ZL, ZL9, ZL Xtra and ZL Xtra9 van variants with the 1.3-liter 16-valve HC-E engine with EFI were made available as an option, and the ZSX van with the 1.5-liter engine with EFI was made available again as an option. The pickup trucks with the same 1.5-liter engine with EFI as the ZSX van were made available as an option as well. Production of the Zebra ended in October 2007 when it was replaced by the Gran Max.

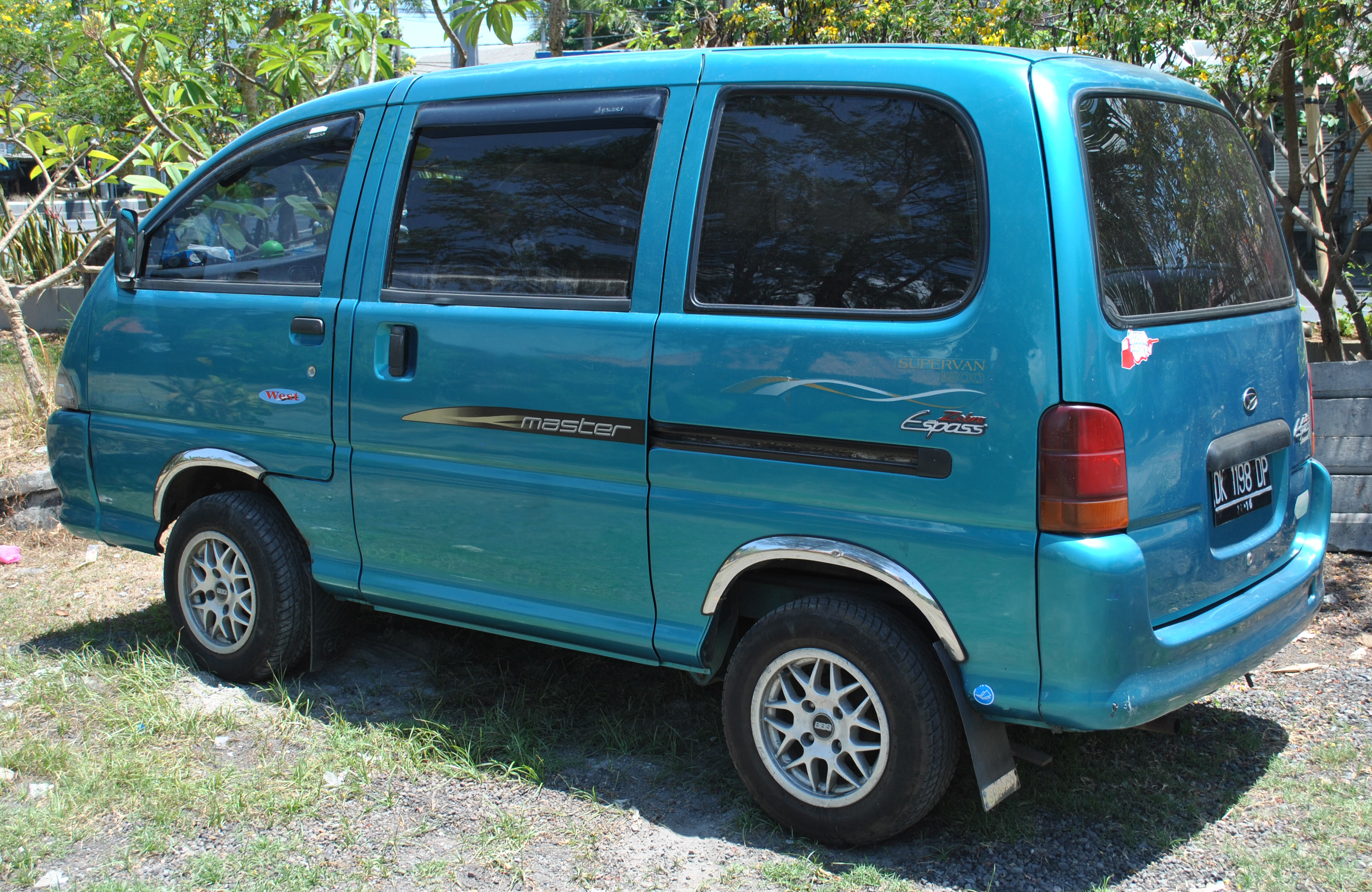
Daihatsu Zebra Espass Supervan 1600 (S92, Indonesia)

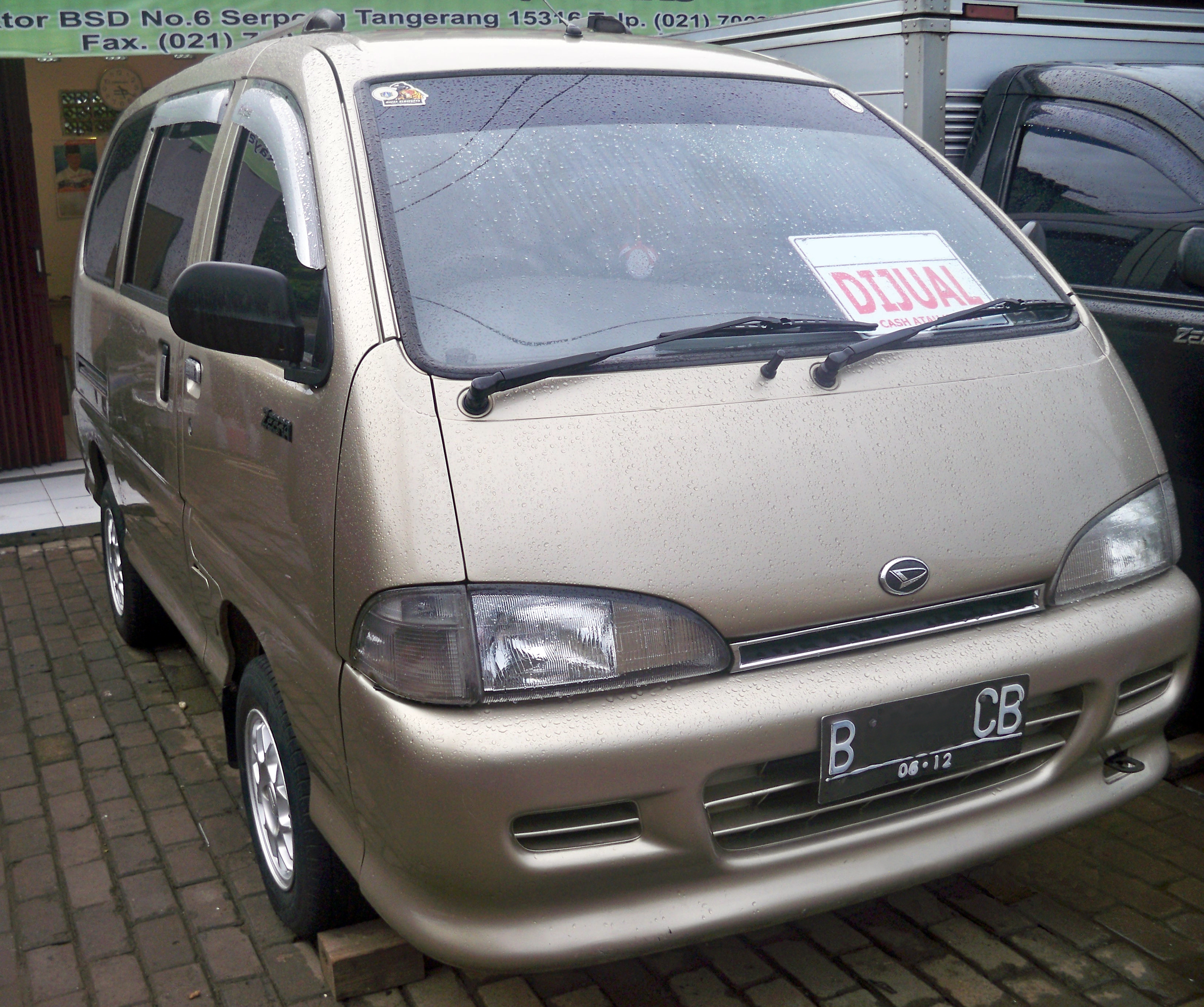
Daihatsu Zebra ZL Xtra Front (S91, Indonesia)

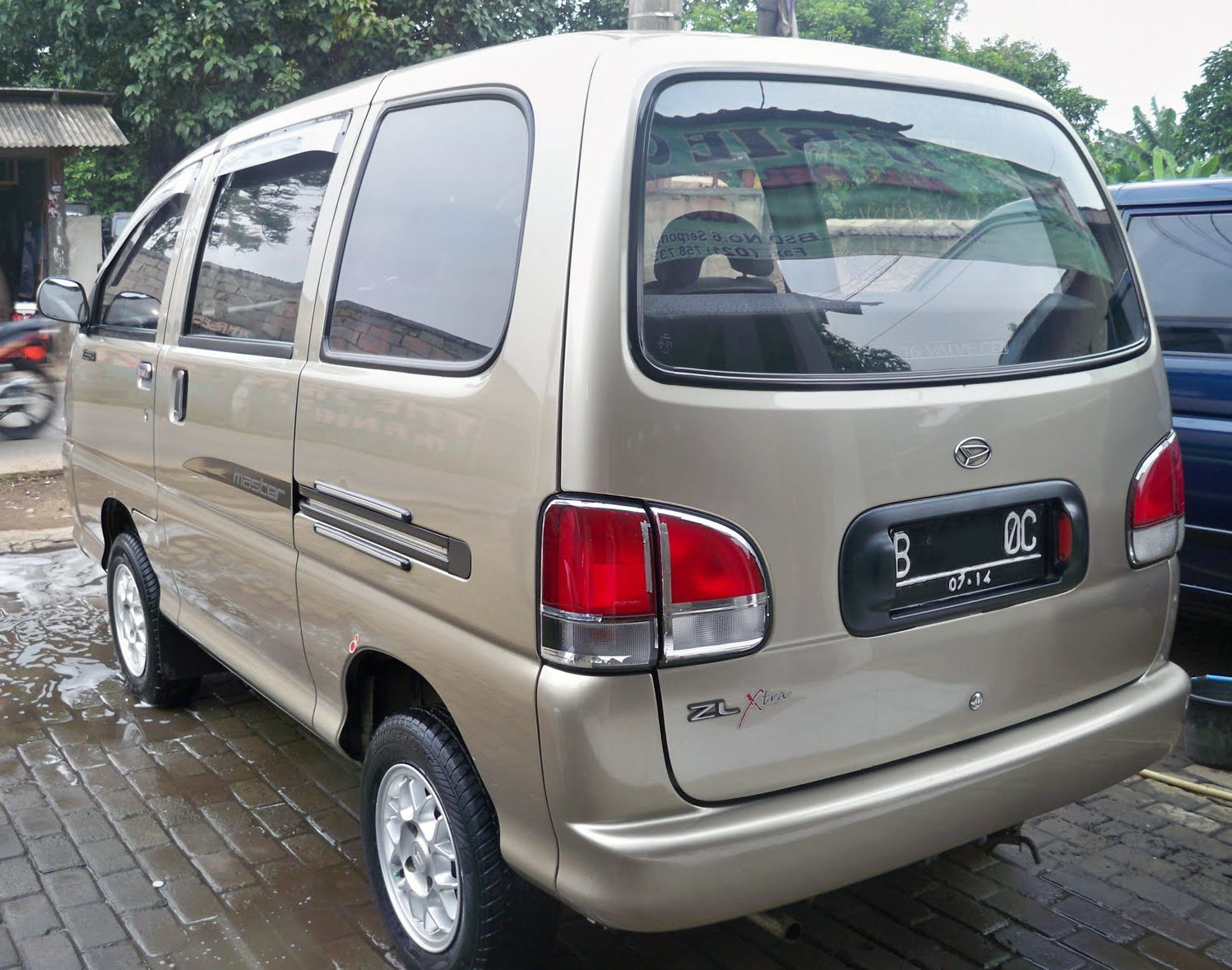
Daihatsu Zebra ZL Xtra Rear (S91, Indonesia)

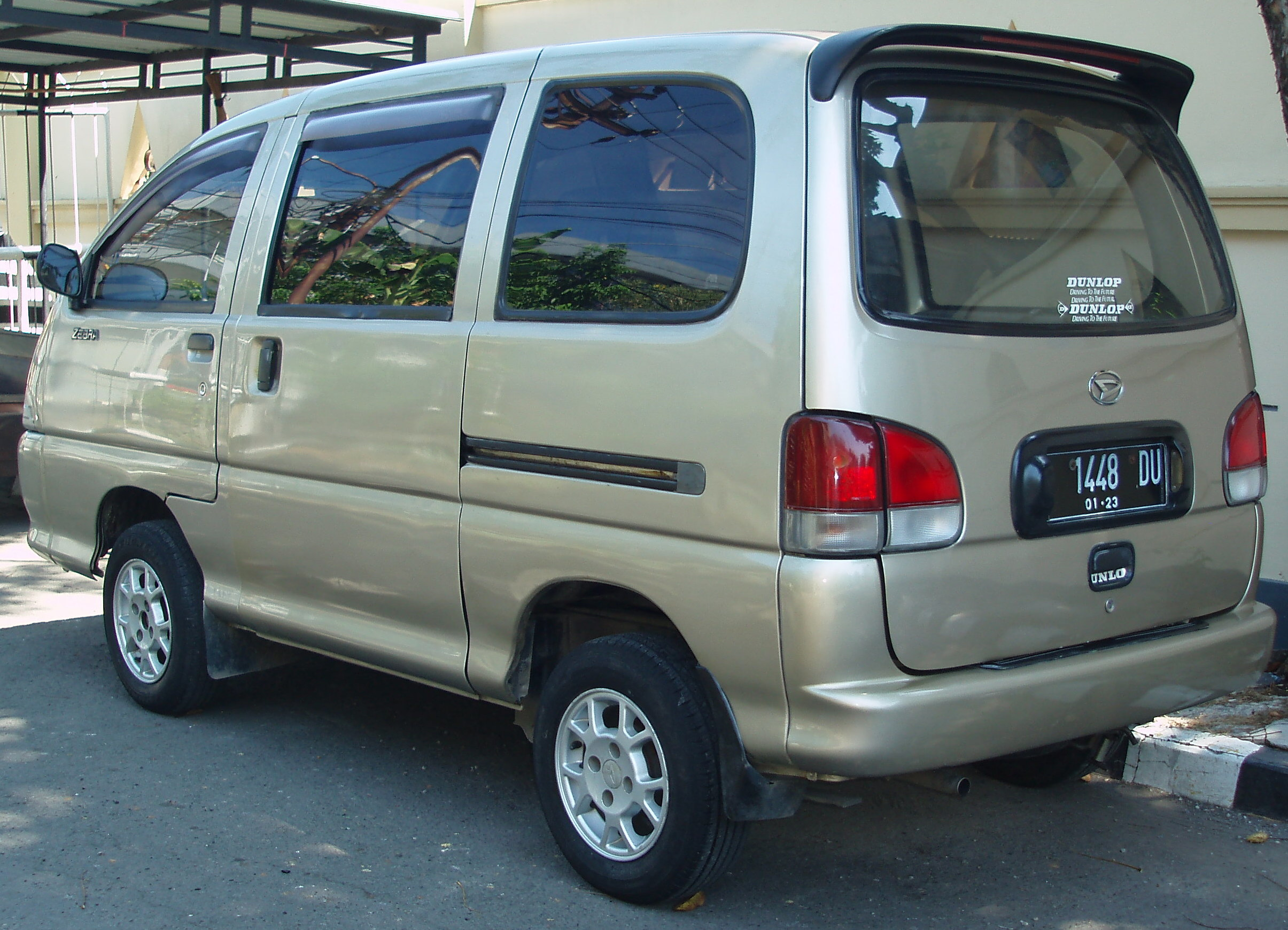
2005 Daihatsu Zebra ZL9 (S91, Indonesia)

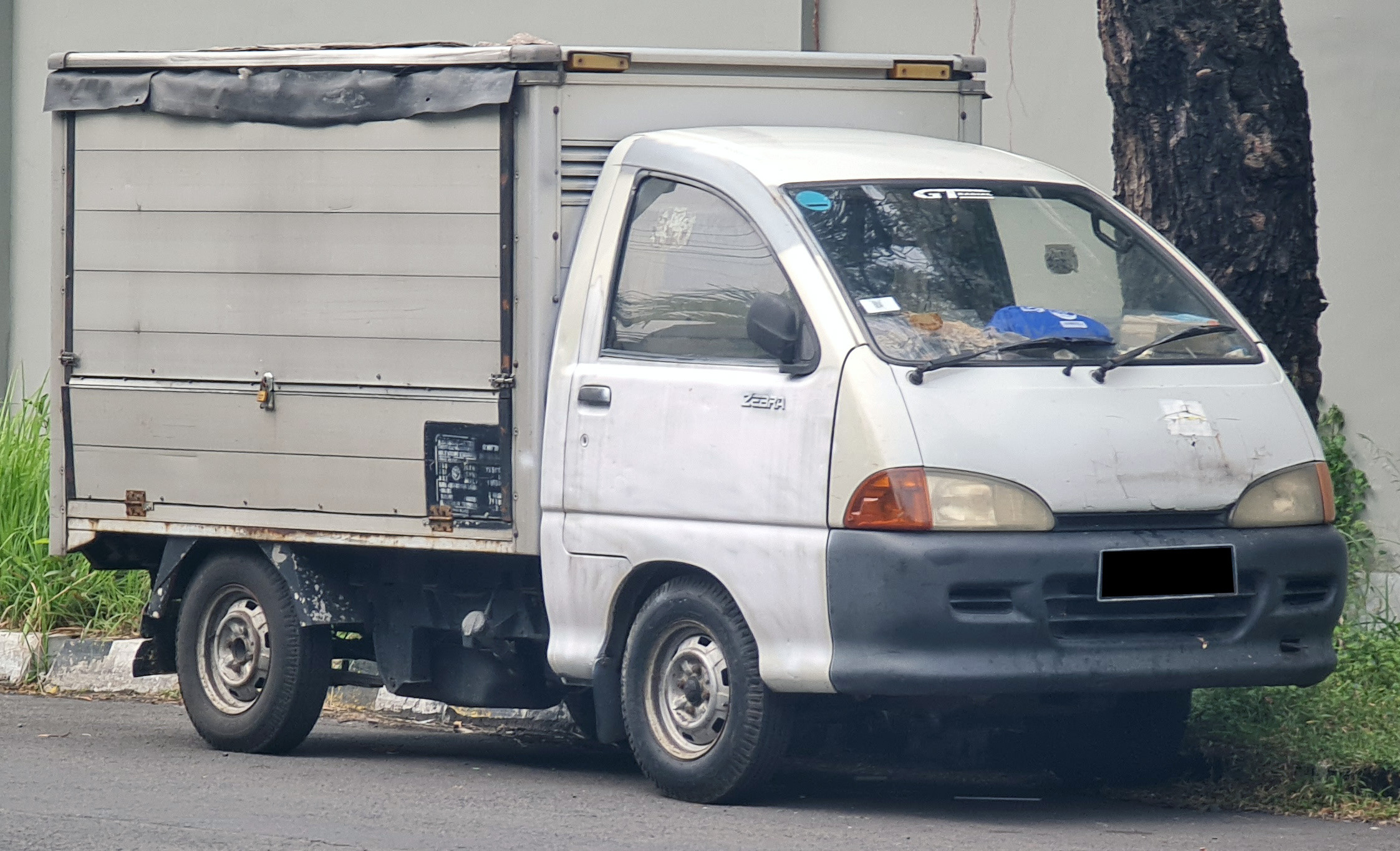
2002 Daihatsu Zebra Box (S91, Indonesia)

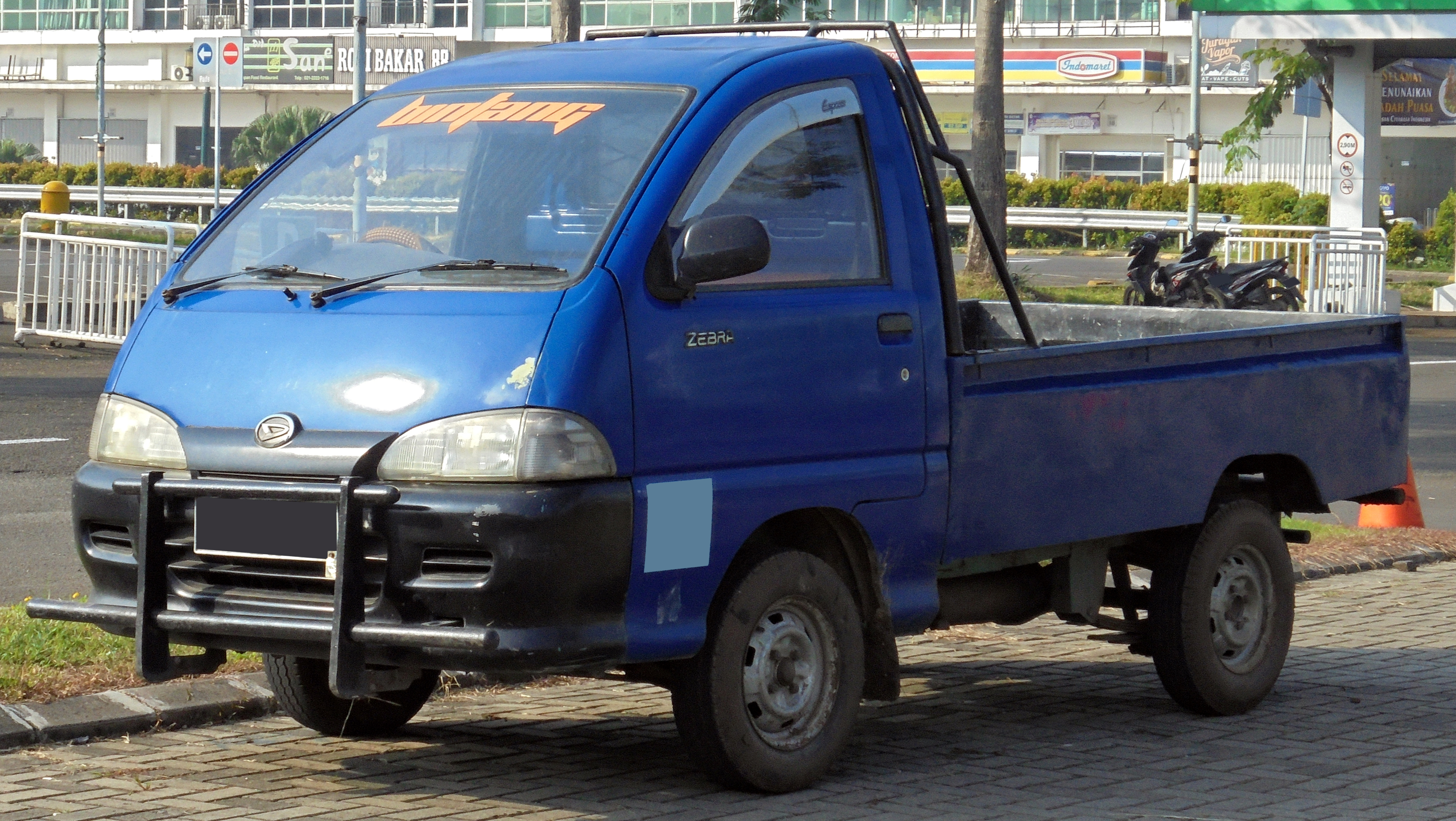
2005 Daihatsu Zebra Pickup (S91, Indonesia)

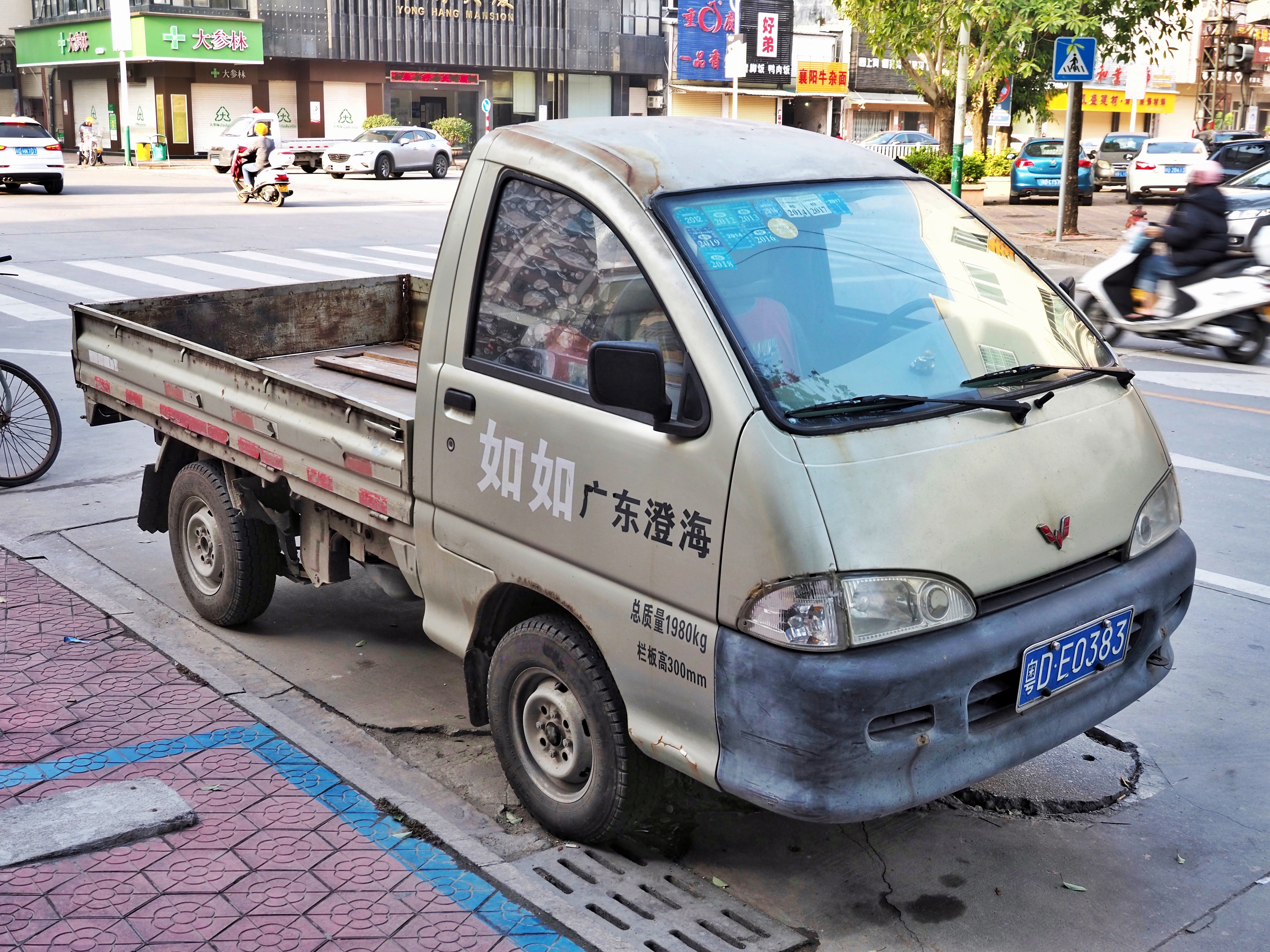
Wuling LZW6370 Pickup Front (China)

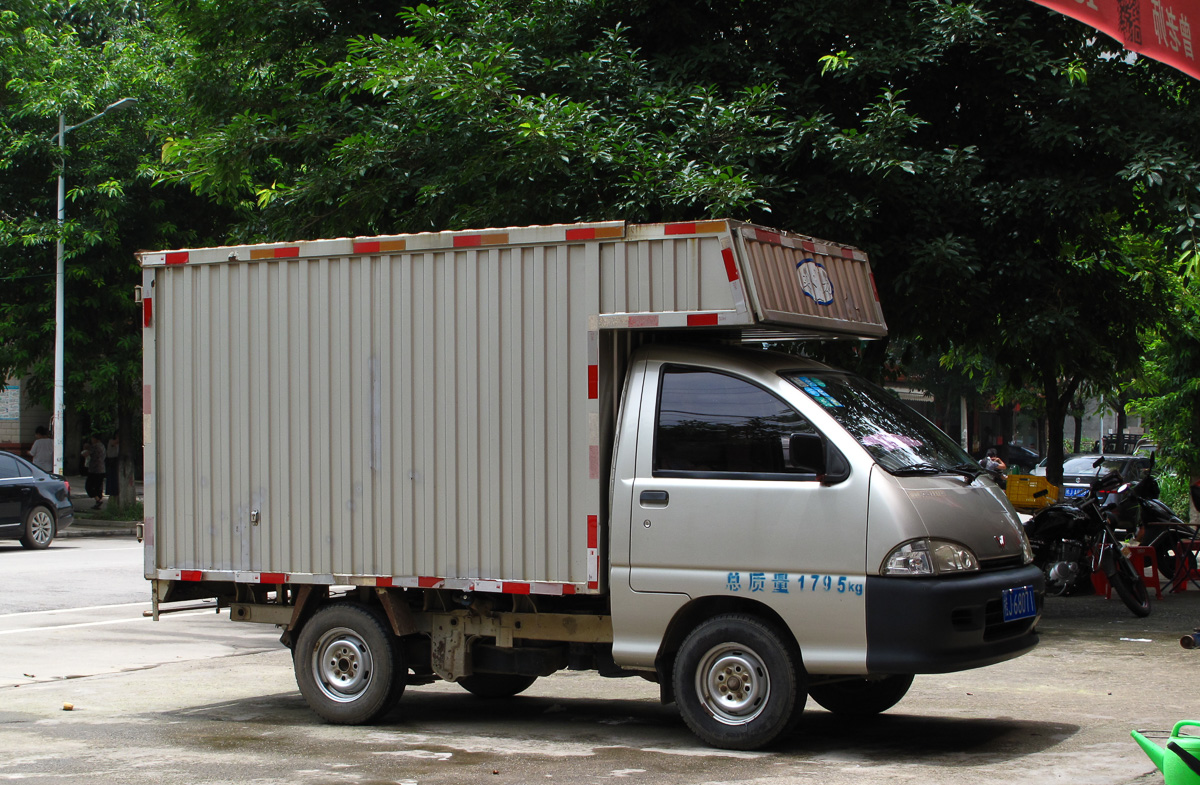
Wuling LZW6370 Box (China)

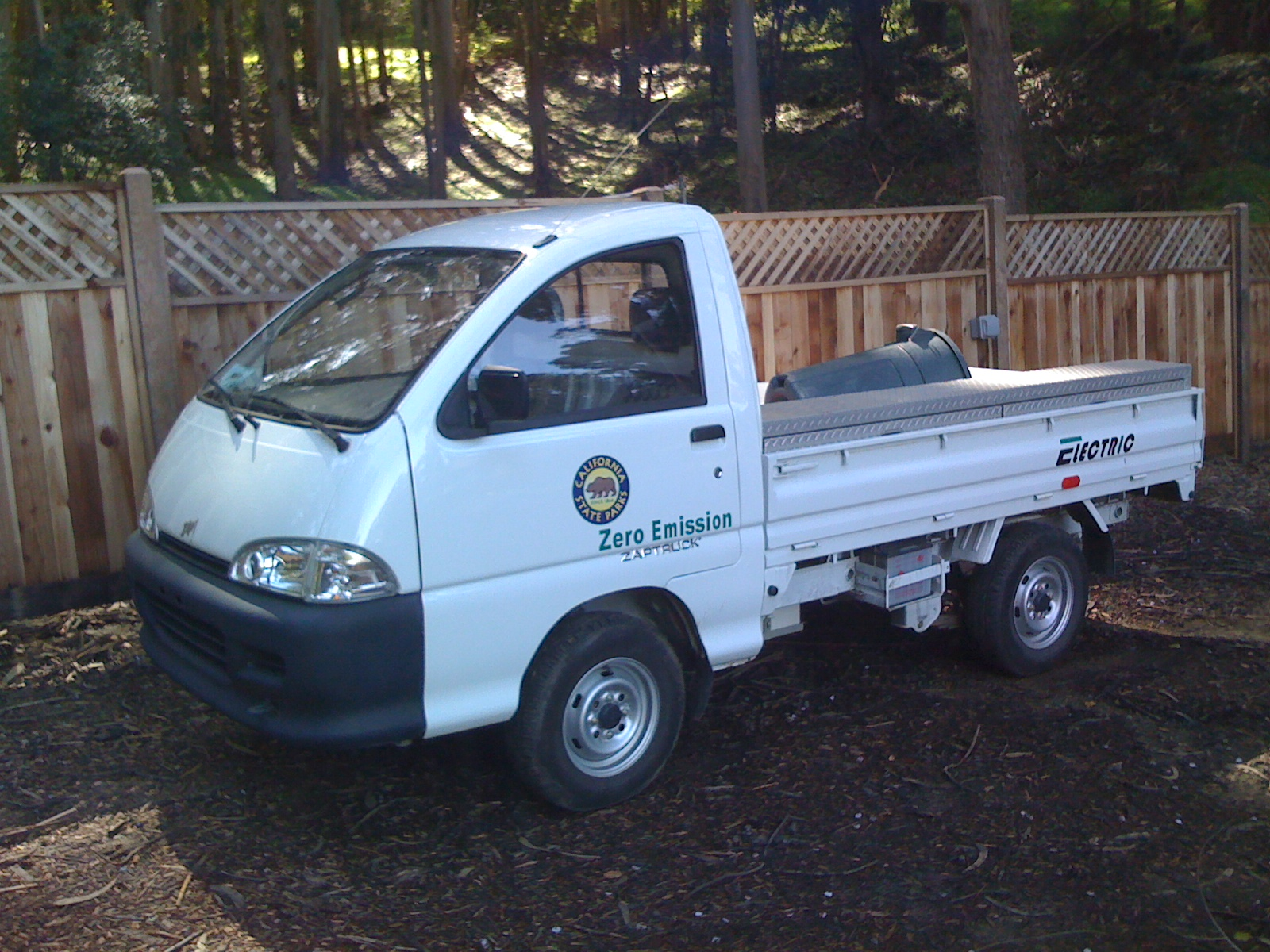
ZAP Truck XL (US)
