= Astra Daihatsu Motor =

Indonesian automotive company

PT Astra Daihatsu Motor

- Astra Daihatsu Motor headquarters in Sunter, Jakarta
- Type: Joint venture
- Industry: Automotive
- Founded: 1992; 34 years ago
- Headquarters: Sunter, Jakarta
- Area served: Indonesia
- Key people: Yasushi Kyoda (president)
- Products: Automobiles
- Production output: ▼525,483 (2019); ▲547,991 (2018)
- Owners: Daihatsu Motor Co. (61.7%); Astra International (31.9%); Toyota Tsusho (6.4%)
- Parent: Daihatsu
- Website: daihatsu.co.id

PT Astra Daihatsu Motor (also called ADM) is an automobile manufacturing company based in Jakarta, Indonesia. It is a joint venture company between Daihatsu, Astra International and Toyota Tsusho. It is the largest car manufacturer in Indonesia by production output and installed capacity, and has been second best-selling car brand behind Toyota. ADM also supplied most Toyota-branded models sold in Indonesia, which includes compact cars such as Avanza, Rush, Agya and Calya.

The company was created as a result of a merger of three companies in 1992, which are PT Daihatsu Indonesia, PT Daihatsu Engine Manufacturing Indonesia, and PT National Astra Motor. Daihatsu increased its stake from 40 to 61.75% in 2002. Distribution, sales and after sales service of Daihatsu vehicles are handled by Daihatsu Sales Operation (AI-DSO), a division of Astra International.

== History ==
In 1973, Astra International acquired the rights to import Daihatsu vehicles into Indonesia. By 1976, Astra became the sole agent, importer, and distributor of Daihatsu in the Indonesian market. In 1978, PT Daihatsu Indonesia was established by Astra International, Daihatsu, and Nichimen Corporation as a steel pressing plant. An engine plant, PT Daihatsu Engine Manufacturing Indonesia (DEMI), was created in 1983. In 1987, PT Nasional Astra Motor was formed as the exclusive agent and importer of Daihatsu. In 1992, these three companies merged to create ADM.

In 2003, ADM along with partner Toyota Astra Motor unveiled the Toyota Avanza and Daihatsu Xenia. The vehicles are part of the first collaboration project of Toyota, Daihatsu, and Astra and combined Toyota's expertise in Toyota Production System (TPS) and Daihatsu's expertise in producing low-cost vehicles. At the time, production capacity of the ADM plant is capped at 80,000 vehicles annually. By 2005, it was expanded to 200,000. It further expanded to current 530,000 after a series of expansions and the opening of a new plant in Karawang.

== Facilities ==
ADM is supported by five plants, which are Sunter Assembly Plant, Sunter Press Plant, Karawang Casting Plant, Karawang Engine Plant and the Karawang Assembly Plant, supported by a spare parts center at Cibitung, with an overall installed production capacity of 530,000 units per year. ADM also operates a Research and Development (R&D) center facility in Karawang. The facility is equipped with a design studio, test courses for vehicle trials on more than simulated 20 types of road conditions, and an Engineering Center facility.

== Models ==
=== Current models ===
Model	Indonesian introduction	Current model		Current production status
Model	Indonesian introduction	Introduction (model code)	Update/facelift	Current production status
Hatchback
Ayla	2013	2023 (A350)	–	Assembled in Indonesia
Sirion	2007	2018 (M800)	2022	Imported from Malaysia (Perodua)
SUV/crossover
Rocky	1988 (nameplate); 2021 (as a crossover)	2021 (A250)	–	Assembled in Indonesia; Imported from Japan (e-Smart Hybrid)
Terios	2006	2017 (F800)	2023	Assembled in Indonesia
MPV
Sigra	2016	2016 (B400)	2022	Assembled in Indonesia
Xenia	2003	2021 (W100)	–	Assembled in Indonesia
Luxio	2009	2009 (S400)	2014	Assembled in Indonesia
Light commercial vehicle
Gran Max	2007	2007 (S400)	2022	Assembled in Indonesia

==== Manufactured for Toyota ====
- Toyota Agya/Wigo (2012–present)
- Toyota Avanza (2003–present)
- Toyota Calya (2016–present)
- Toyota Raize (2021–present)
- Toyota Rush (2006–present)
- Toyota LiteAce/TownAce (2008–present, export only)

==== Manufactured for Mazda ====
- Mazda Bongo (2020–present, export only)

=== Former models ===
==== Manufactured locally ====
- Daihatsu Ceria (2001–2007)
- Daihatsu Charade (1977–1998)
- Daihatsu Classy (1990–1998)
- Daihatsu Delta (–1998)
- Daihatsu Feroza (1984–2002)
- Daihatsu Hijet (1977–1986)
- Daihatsu Hi-Max (2016–2019)
- Daihatsu Hiline (1986–2007)
- Daihatsu Rocky (1988–1997)
- Daihatsu Taft (1976–2007)
- Daihatsu Zebra (1986–1995)
- Daihatsu Zebra Espass (1995–2007)

==== Imported ====
- Daihatsu Copen (2015–2018, imported from Japan)
- Daihatsu Hijet (1972–1977, imported from Japan)
- Daihatsu YRV (2001–2003, imported from Japan)
