= Daihatsu Sigra =

Mini MPV produced by Astra Daihatsu Motor

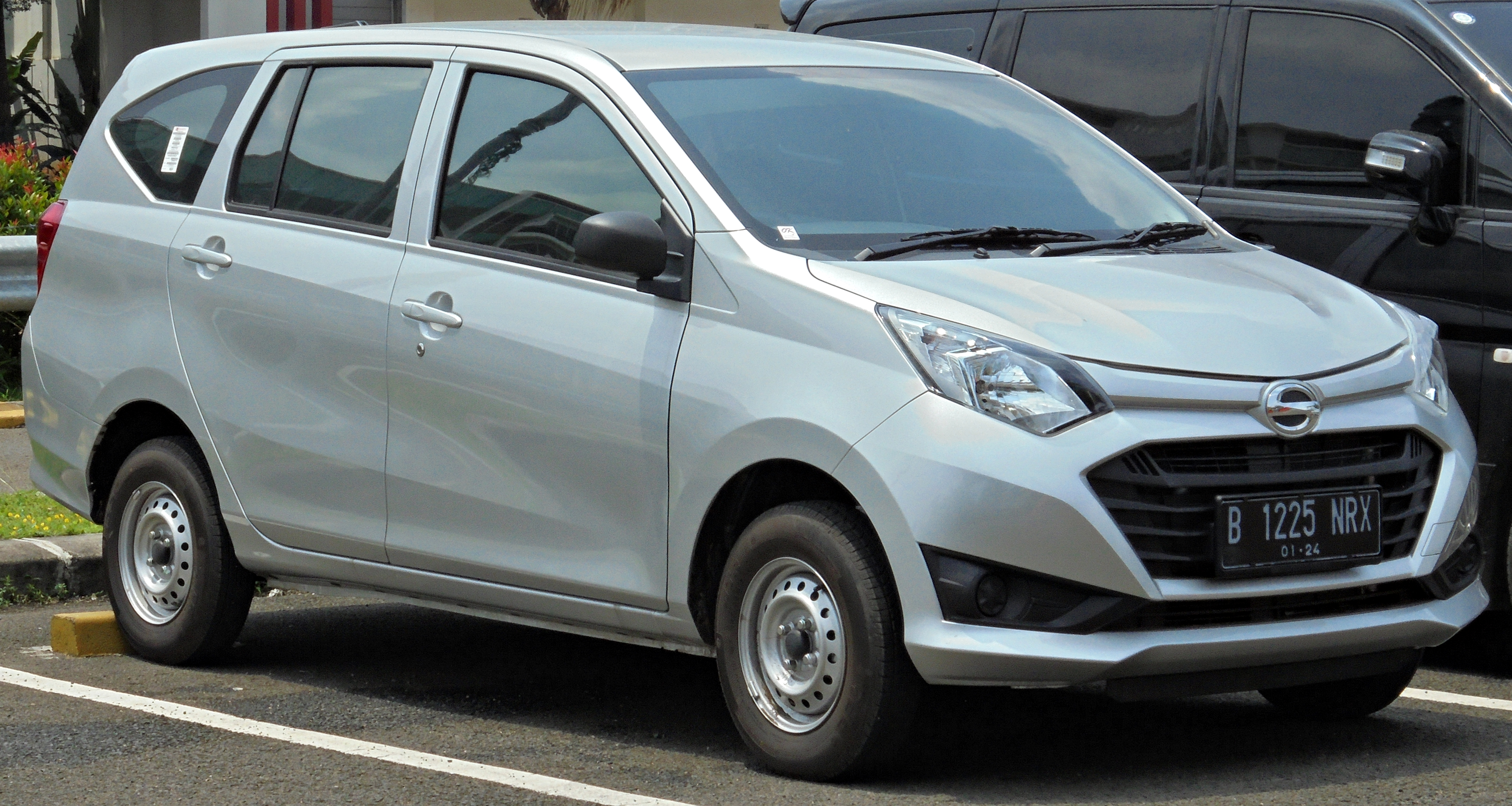
- 2018 Daihatsu Sigra 1.0 D (B400RS, pre-facelift)

Overview
- Manufacturer: Daihatsu
- Model code: B400
- Also called: Toyota Calya
- Production: July 2016 – present
- Assembly: Indonesia: Karawang (ADM); Karawang (TMMIN; Calya, 2019–present)
- Designer: List: Jirou Matsueda, Satoshi Isayama, Shinji Tamura and Yoshihisa Okuno (pre-facelift); Jendro Trimaryanto and Mark Widjaja (facelift); Keiichi Enokido (pre-facelift interior)

Body and chassis
- Class: A-segment
- Body style: 5-door wagon
- Layout: Front-engine, front-wheel-drive
- Platform: Daihatsu Global A-Segment platform
- Related: Daihatsu Ayla; Perodua Axia; Perodua Bezza

Powertrain
- Engine: Petrol: 998 cc 1KR-VE I3 (B400; Sigra only); 1197 cc 3NR-VE I4 (B401)
- Power output: 49 kW (66 hp; 67 PS) (1KR-VE); 65 kW (87 hp; 88 PS) (3NR-VE)
- Transmission: 5-speed manual; 4-speed automatic

Dimensions
- Wheelbase: 2,525 mm (99.4 in)
- Length: 4,070–4,110 mm (160.2–161.8 in)
- Width: 1,655 mm (65.2 in)
- Height: 1,600 mm (63.0 in)
- Kerb weight: 920–990 kg (2,028–2,183 lb)

The Daihatsu Sigra is an A-segment MPV with standard three-row seating designed by Daihatsu and manufactured by Astra Daihatsu Motor in Indonesia since July 2016 to be sold exclusively in the country. Developed by Daihatsu chief engineer Nobuhiko Ono, it is built on lengthened Ayla's platform and positioned below the Xenia as a more affordable MPV option for the Indonesian market, where three-row MPVs have high demand in the country. It is also rebadged and sold by Toyota as the Toyota Calya with a differentiated front fascia. The cars were built to meet the "Low Cost Green Car" regulation by the Indonesian government that abolished luxury goods tax for economical cars.

The Sigra was previewed by UFC, UFC2 and UFC 3 concept cars that was shown in 2012, 2013 and 2014 respectively. The production model was unveiled on 2 August 2016 alongside the Calya and launched at the 24th Gaikindo Indonesia International Auto Show on 11 August 2016. Both cars are manufactured at the Karawang plant, with a claimed localisation level of 94%.

The name Sigra was taken from the Sanskrit word meaning 'quick response', while Calya means 'perfection'. Same with the Ayla/Agya, the Sigra using a S-shaped front logo, while the Calya for the opting for a Garuda-inspired front badge, to comply with the requirements of the LCGC program.

== Engines ==
Petrol engines
Chassis code	Model	Engine	Transmission	Power	Torque	Top Speed	Applications
B400	1.0	998 cc 1KR-VE DOHC 12-valve EFI straight-three with VVT-i	5-speed manual	49 kW (66 hp; 67 PS) at 6,000 rpm	89 N⋅m (66 lb⋅ft) at 4,400 rpm	151 km/h (94 mph)	Sigra only
B401	1.2	1,197 cc 3NR-VE DOHC 16-valve EFI straight-four with Dual VVT-i	5-speed manual 4-speed automatic	65 kW (87 hp; 88 PS) at 6,000 rpm	108 N⋅m (80 lb⋅ft) at 4,200 rpm	163 km/h (101 mph)	Sigra/Calya

== Grade levels ==
Model	Grade	Transmission	Year
Sigra	1.0 D	5-speed manual	2016–present
Sigra	1.0 M	5-speed manual	2016–present
Sigra	1.2 X	5-speed manual 4-speed automatic	2016–present
Sigra	1.2 X Deluxe	5-speed manual 4-speed automatic	2016–present
Sigra	1.2 R	5-speed manual 4-speed automatic	2016–present
Sigra	1.2 R Deluxe	5-speed manual 4-speed automatic	2016–present
Calya	1.2 E	5-speed manual	2016–present
Calya	1.2 E	4-speed automatic	2016–2019
Calya	1.2 G	5-speed manual 4-speed automatic	2016–present

== Facelift ==
The Sigra received its facelift on 16 September 2019, along with the Calya. The facelift consisted of redesigned front fascia, longer rear number plate garnish and usage of LED headlights (except for Sigra 1.0 D). In the interior, a storage space below the gear lever was also added. Both cars received another minor update on 7 July 2022.

The third minor facelift Sigra was unveiled at GIIAS 2026. Features a two-tone colour, red accents on the front grille, and black door handle. The third minor facelift is only available on the 1.2 R trim. The Calya received the third minor facelift in November 2026 with new two-tone gun metal alloy wheel design, redesigned grille with geometrical pattern, and bronze coloured rear number plate garnish. There are no changes in technical aspect of engine and transmission, either interior.

== Gallery ==
=== Sigra ===
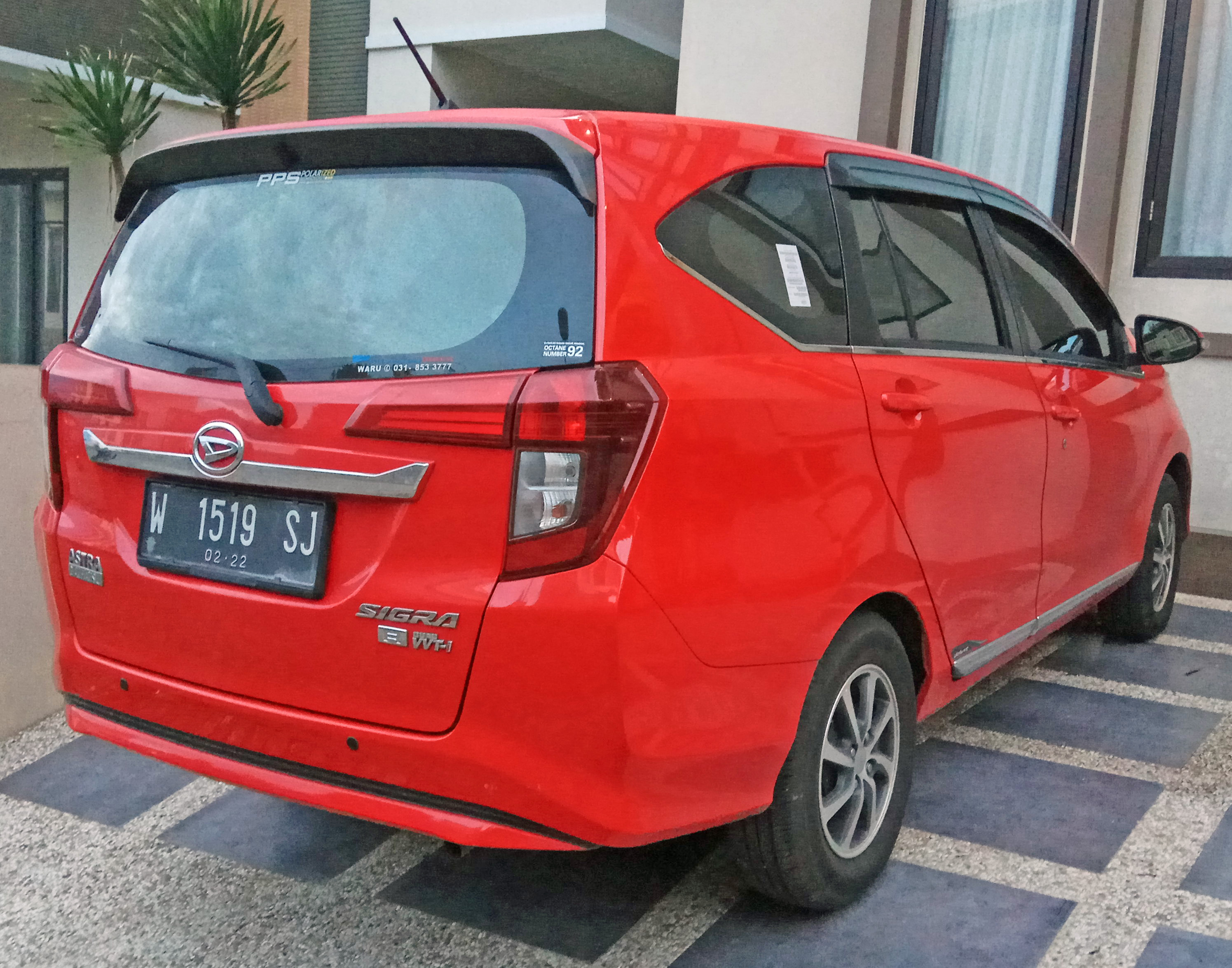
2017 Sigra 1.2 R Deluxe (B401RS, pre-facelift)

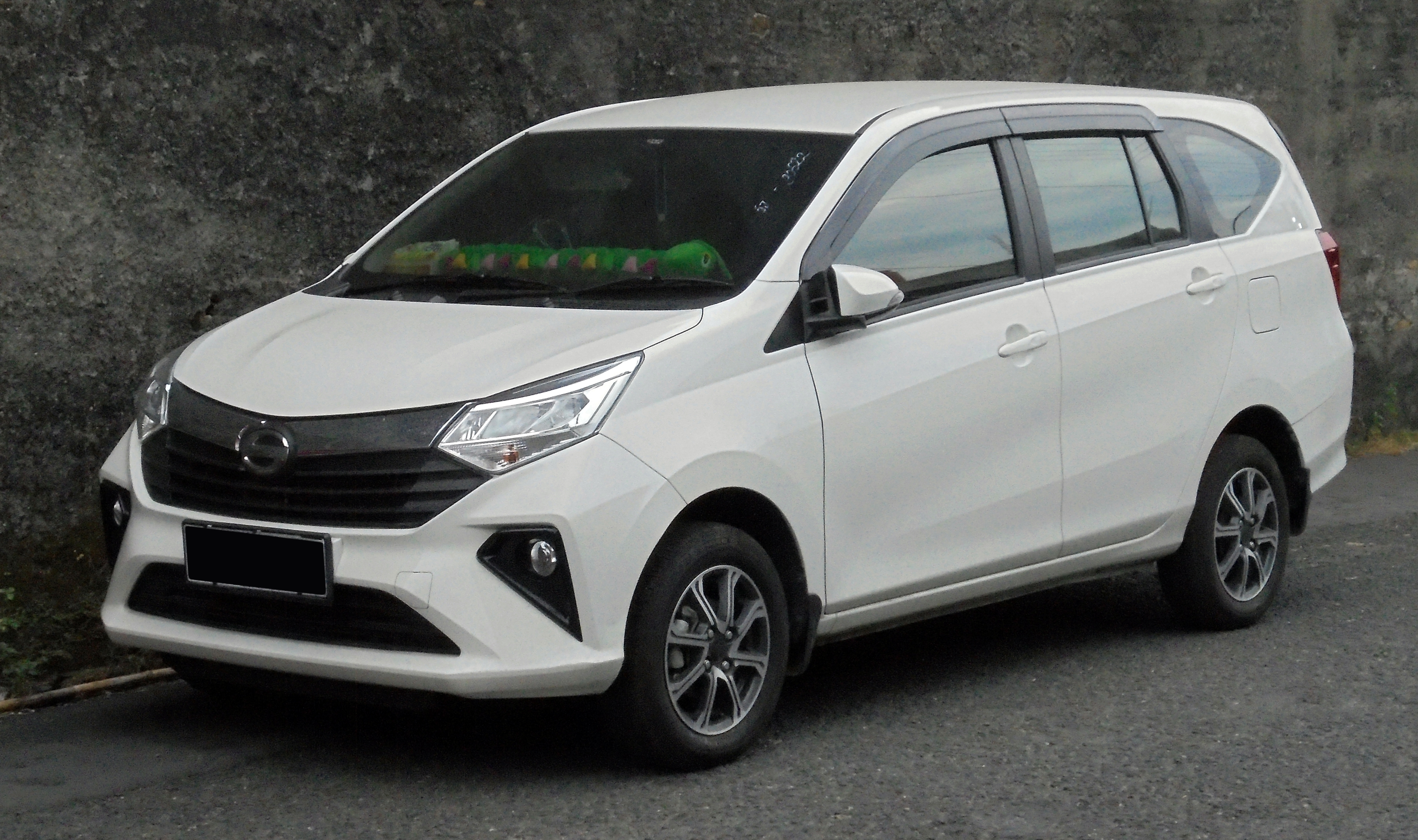
2020 Sigra 1.2 R (B401RS, first facelift)

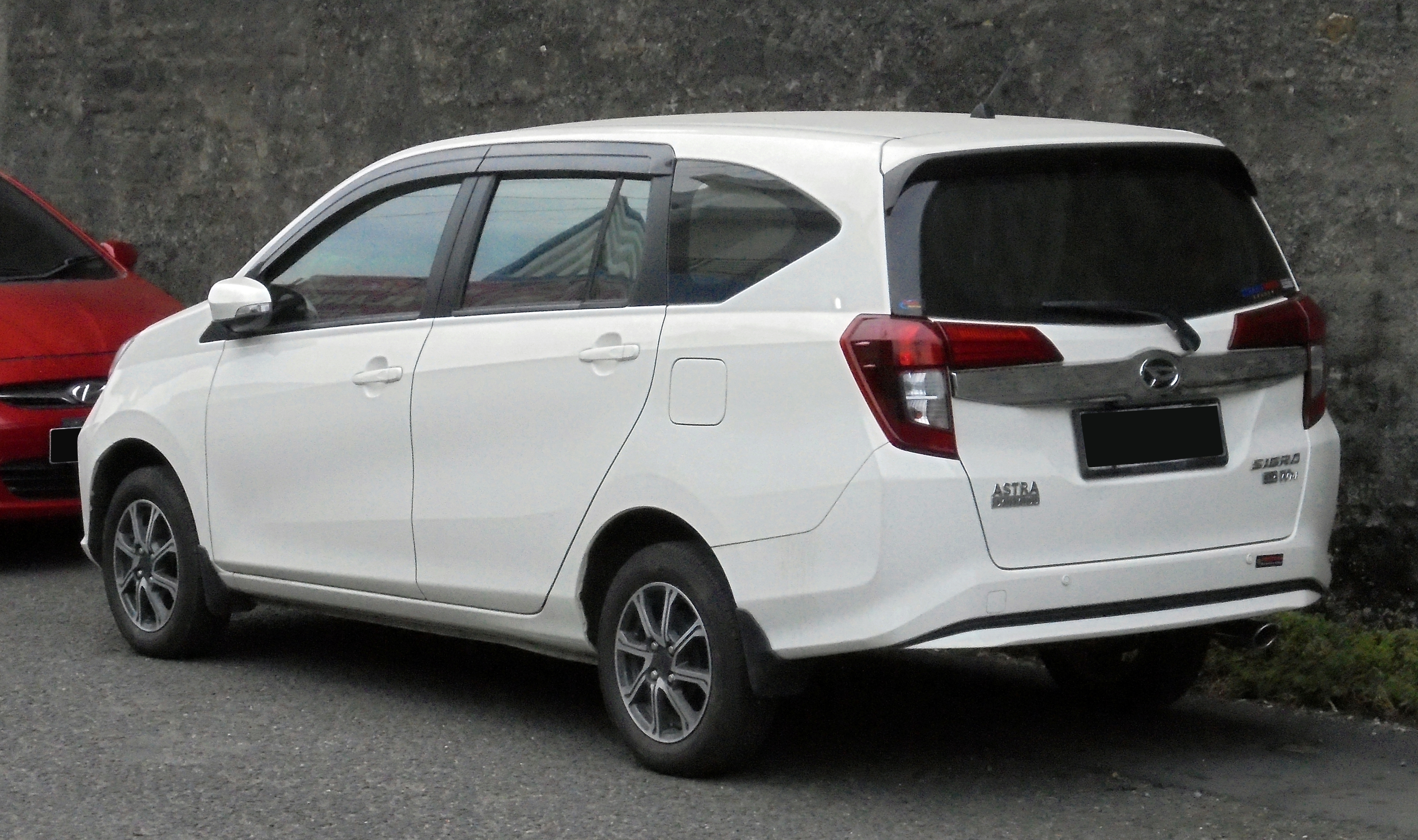
2020 Sigra 1.2 R (B401RS, first facelift)

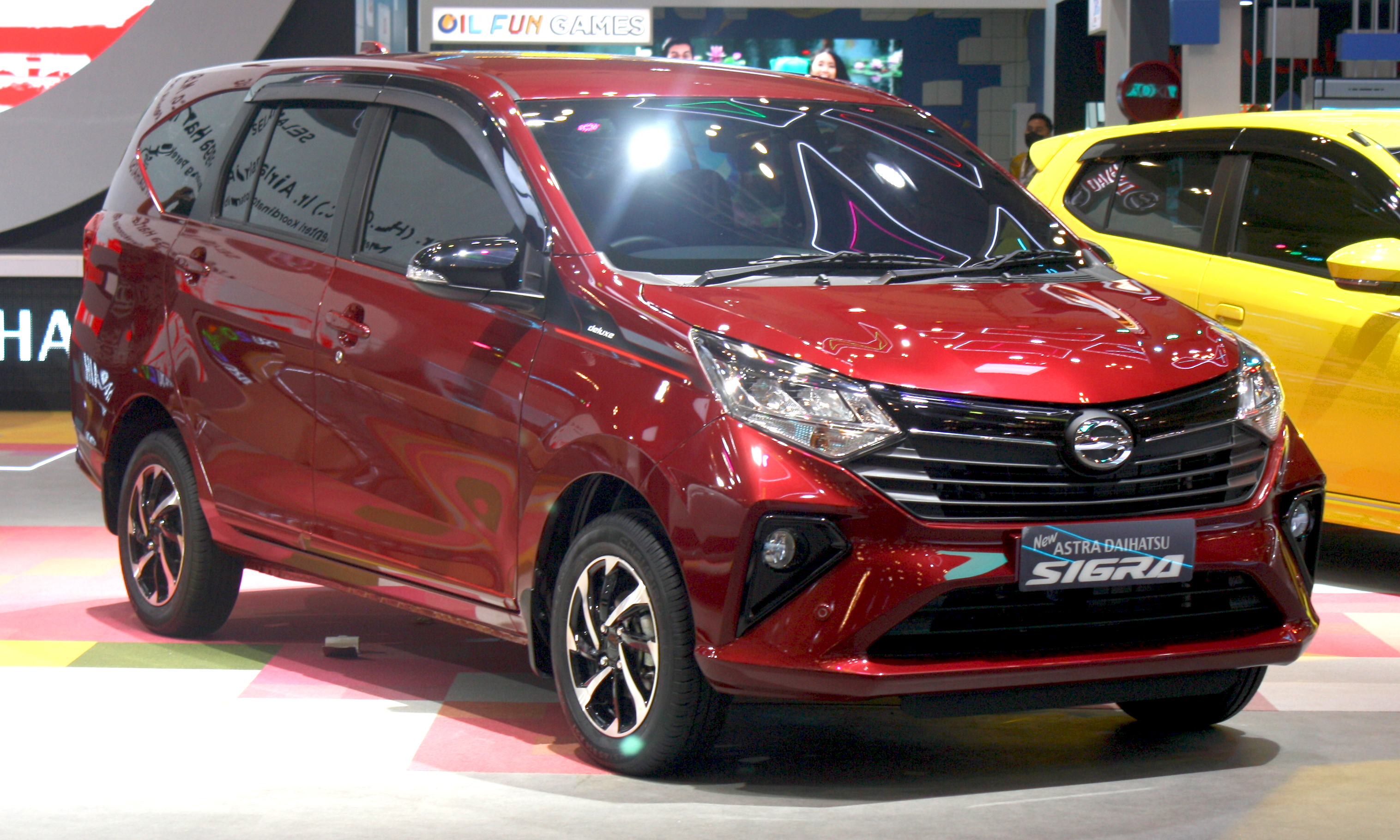
2022 Sigra 1.2 R Deluxe (B401RS, first facelift)

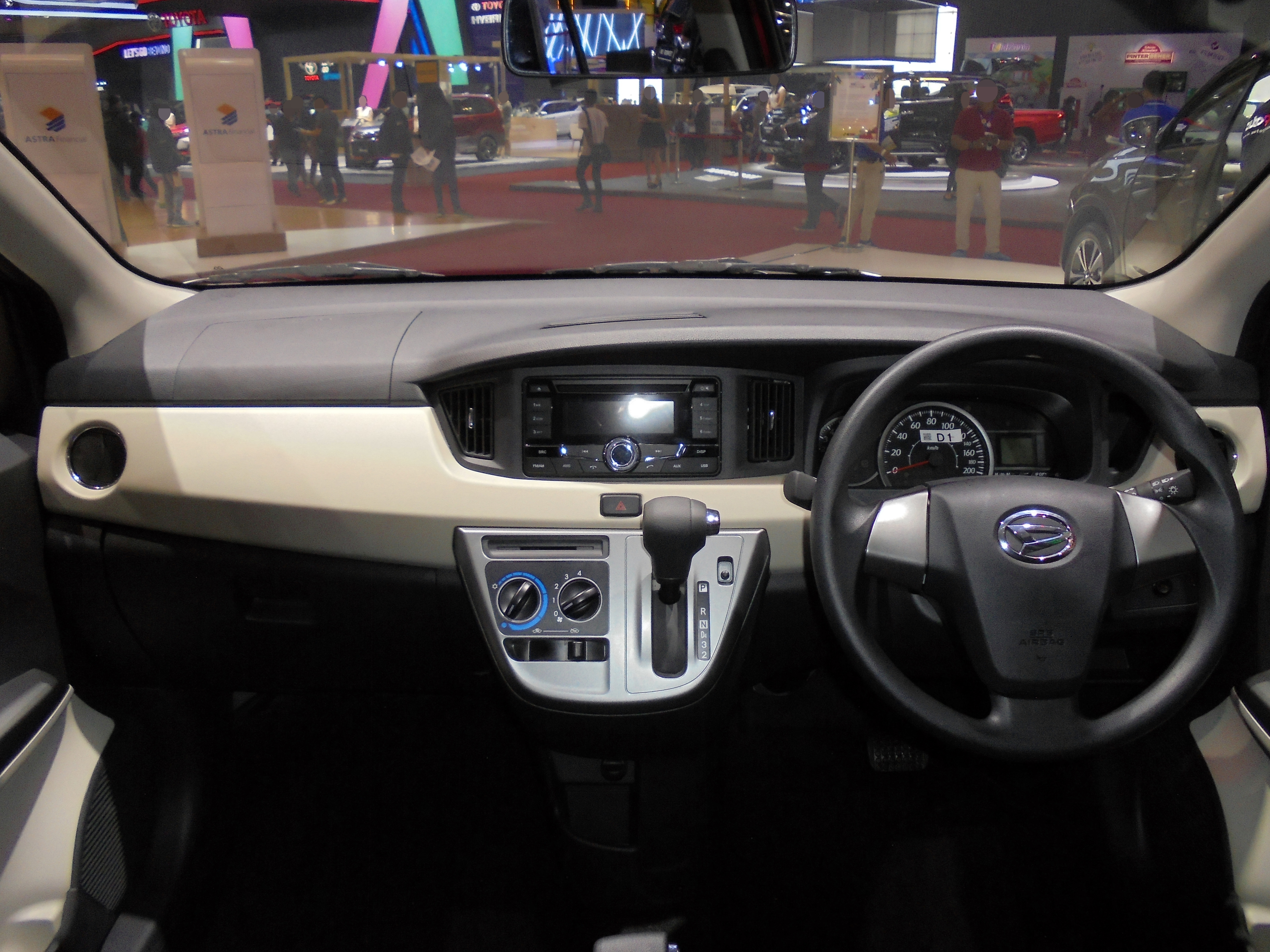
2019 Sigra 1.2 R Deluxe interior (pre-facelift)

2026 Sigra 1.2 R Deluxe (second facelift)

Interior (1.2 R; second facelift)

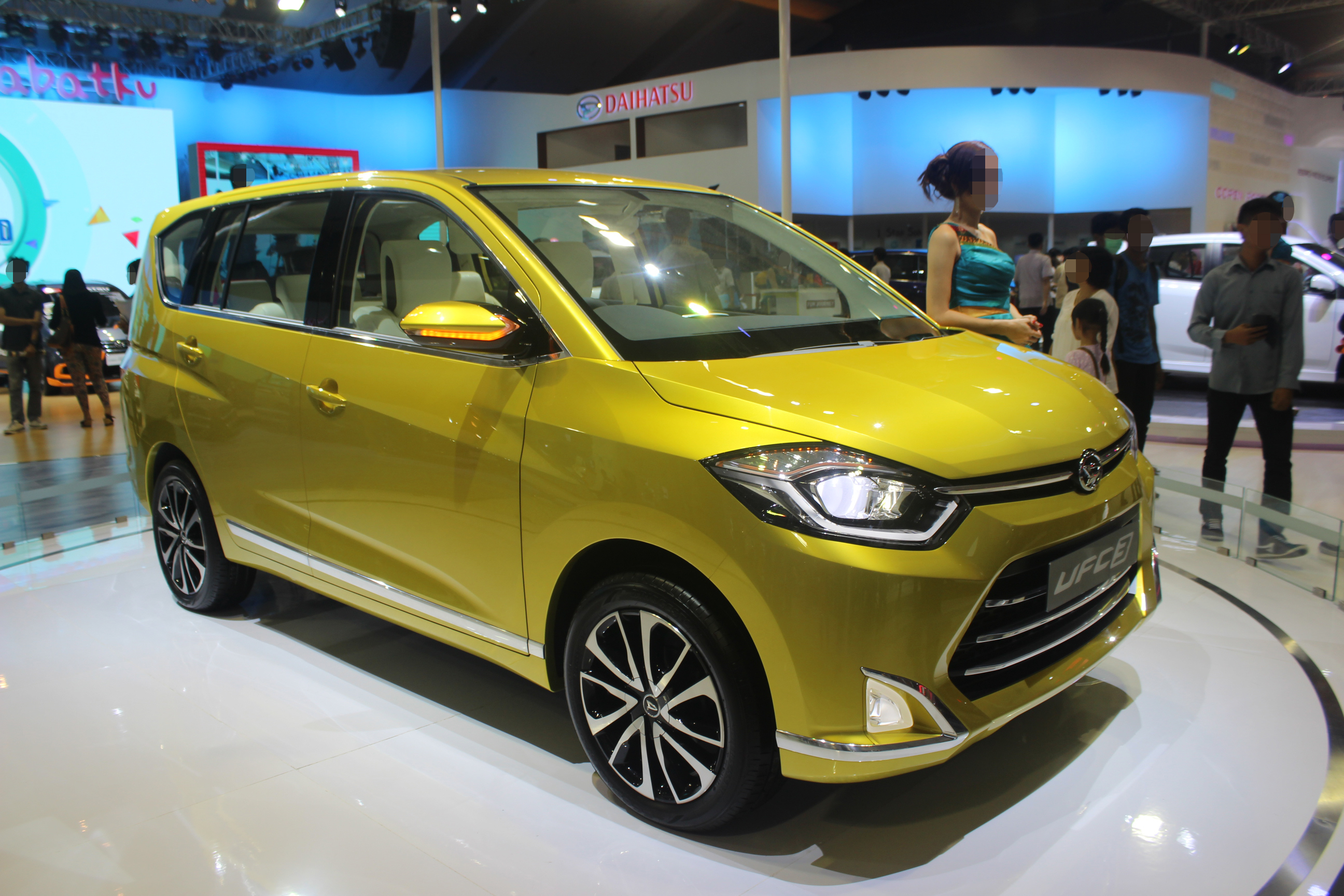
UFC 3 concept car

=== Calya ===
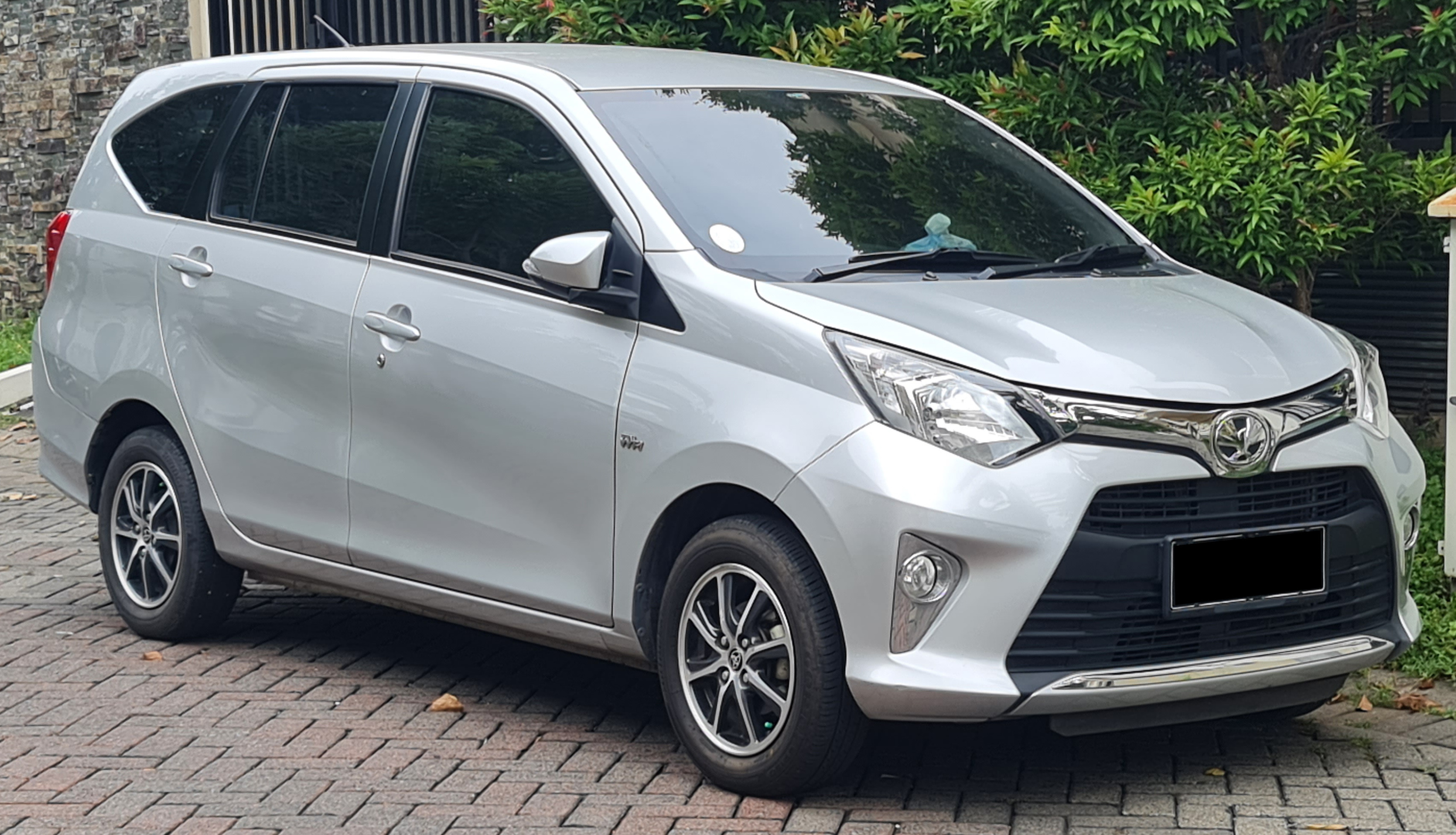
2016 Toyota Calya 1.2 G (B401RA, pre-facelift)

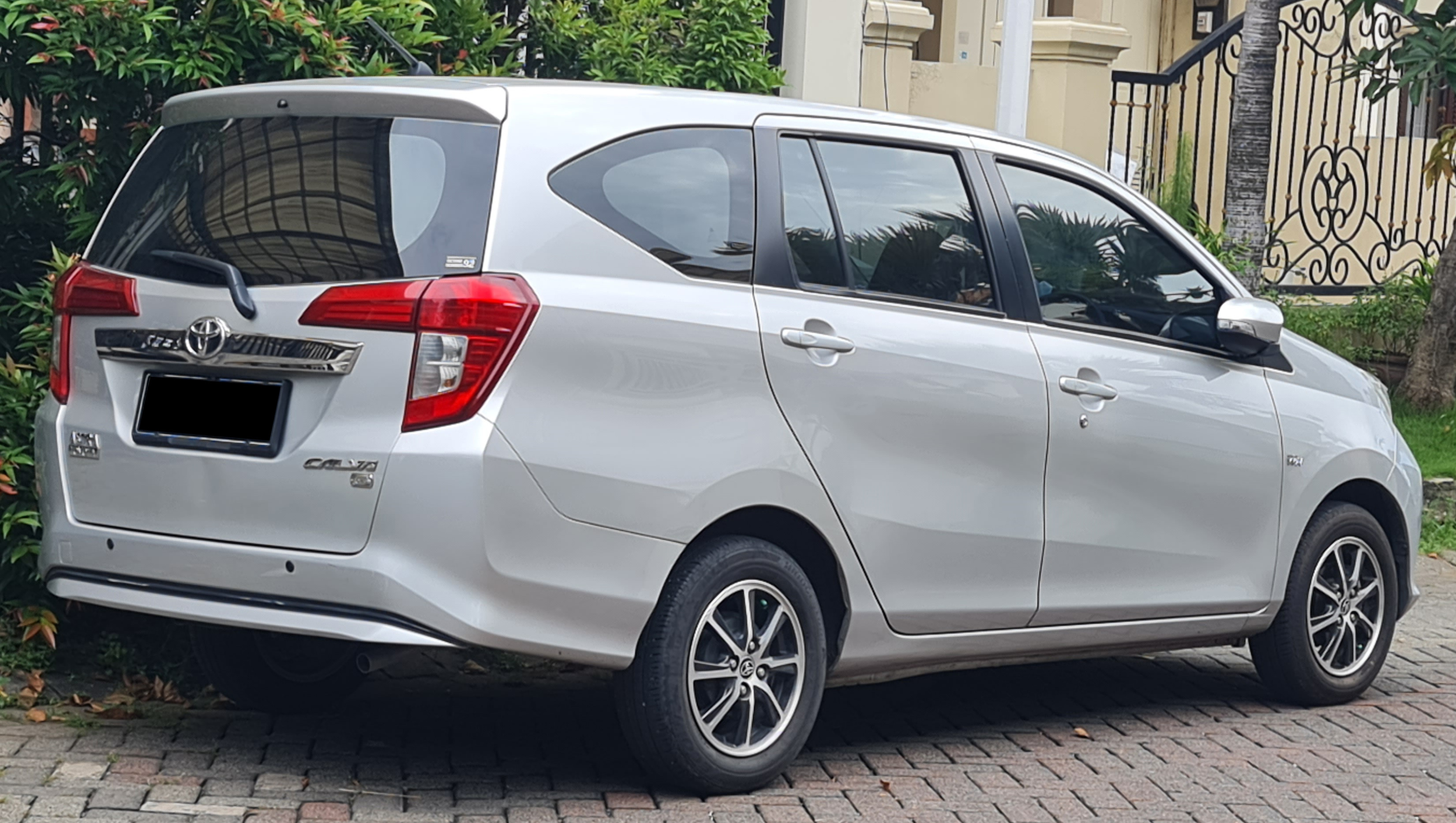
2016 Calya 1.2 G (B401RA, pre-facelift)

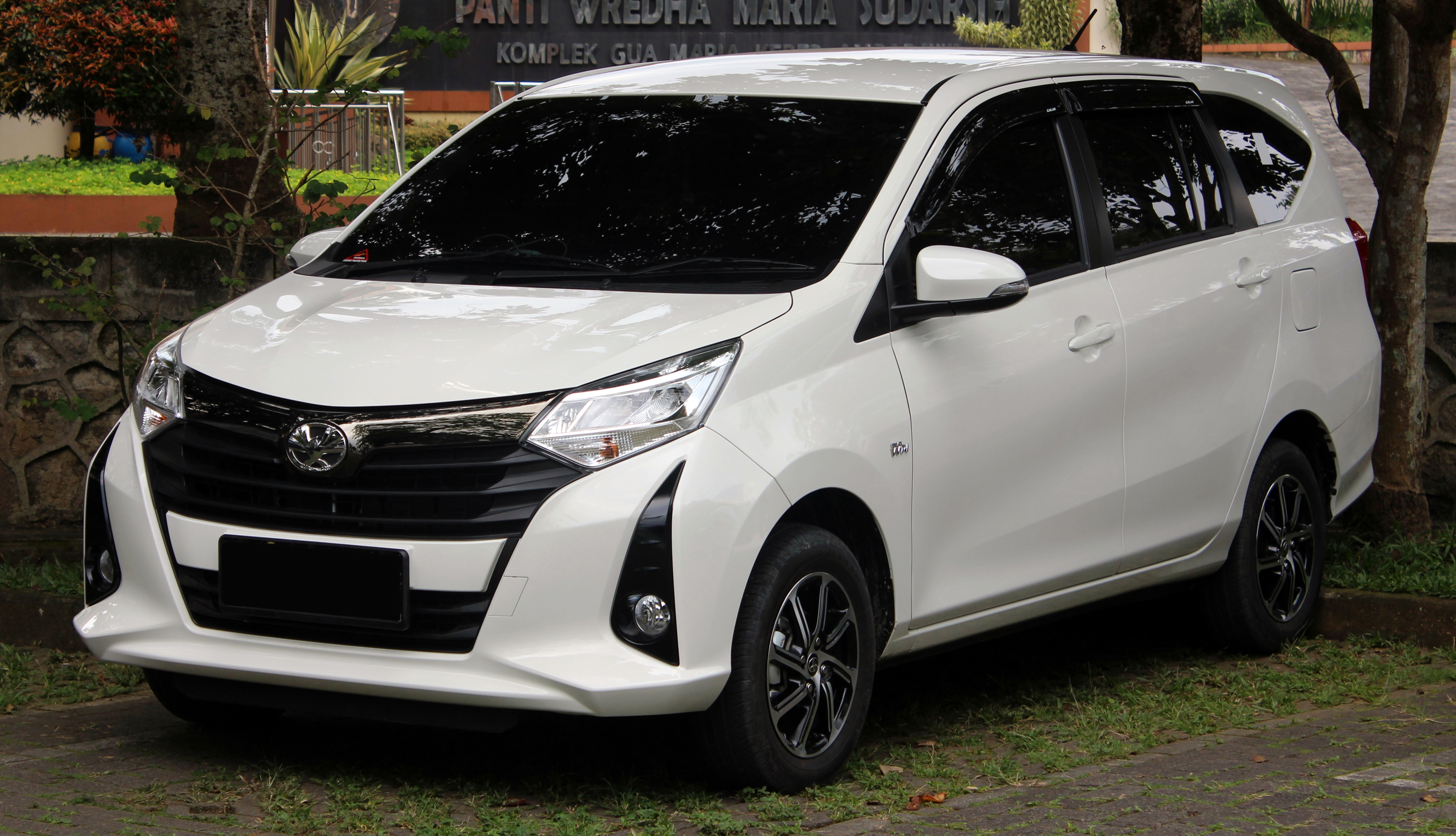
2022 Calya 1.2 G (B401RA, first facelift)

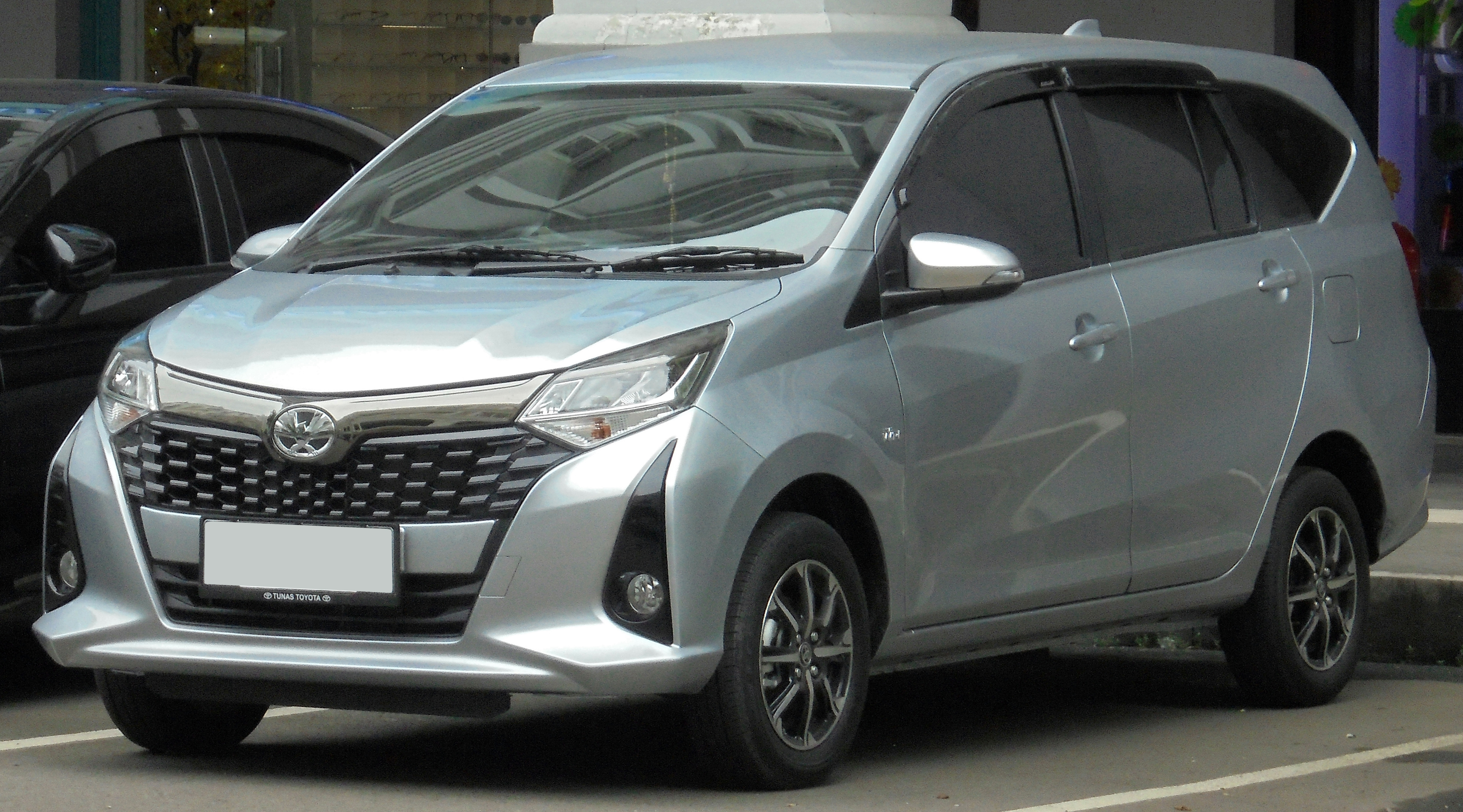
2022 Calya 1.2 G (B401RA, second facelift)

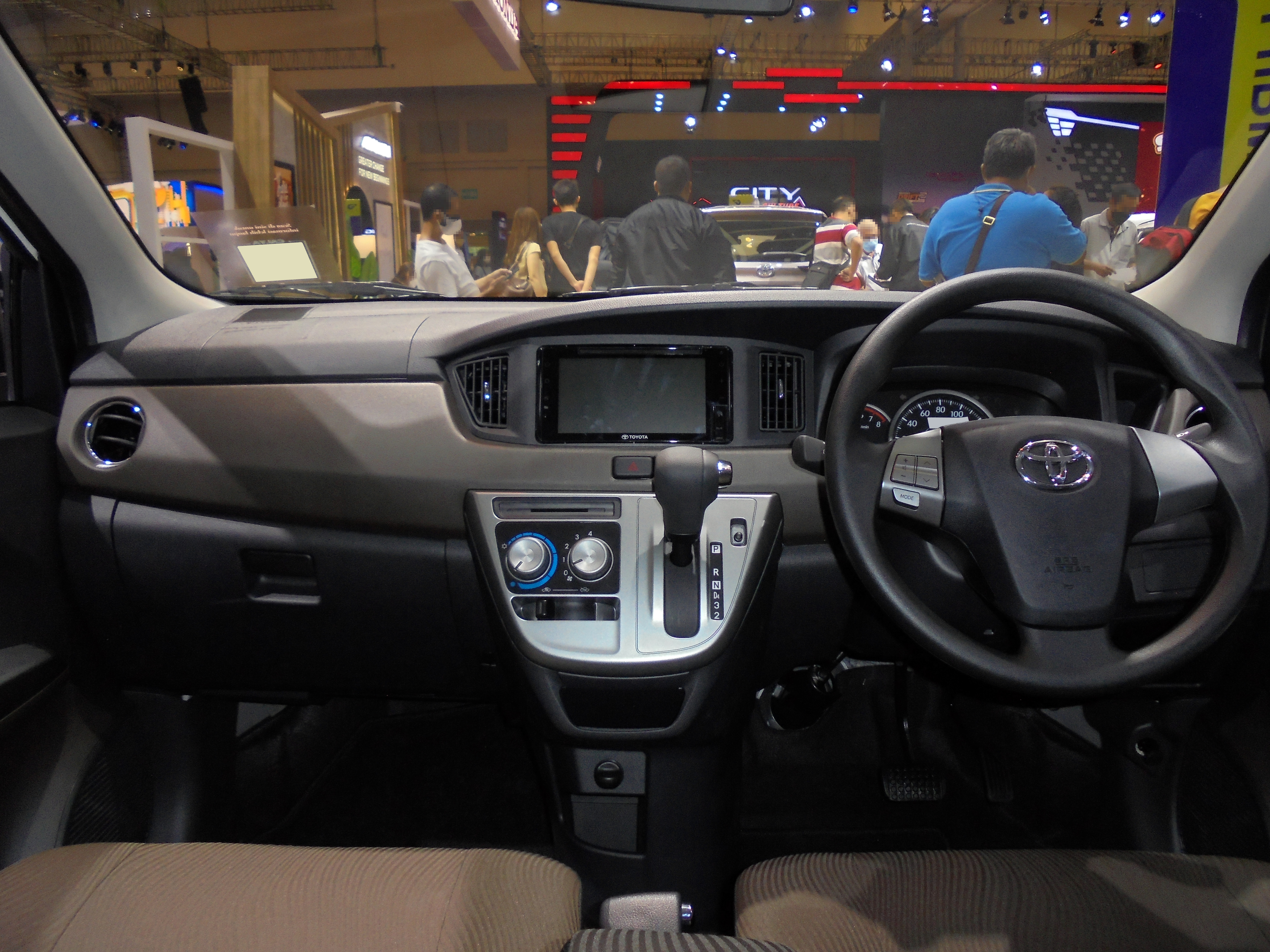
2021 Calya 1.2 G interior (facelift)

== Safety ==
ASEAN NCAP test results Daihatsu Sigra (2016)
Test	Points	Stars
Adult occupant:	6.82	1 /5 stars
Child occupant:	46%	2 /5 stars
Safety assist:	NA	

ASEAN NCAP test results Toyota Calya (2016)
Test	Points	Stars
Adult occupant:	12.93	4 /5 stars
Child occupant:	73%	4 /5 stars
Safety assist:	NA	

== Sales ==
Year	Indonesia	
Year	Daihatsu Sigra	Toyota Calya
2016	31,939	47,287
2017	44,993	73,236
2018	50,907	63,970
2019	52,283	54,549
2020	22,559	21,175
2021	40,283	35,375
2022	51,427	43,582
2023	61,752	45,801
2024	54,709	39,909
2025	34,452	31,378
Total	445,304	456,262
