= Daihatsu Luxio =

Minivan produced by Daihatsu

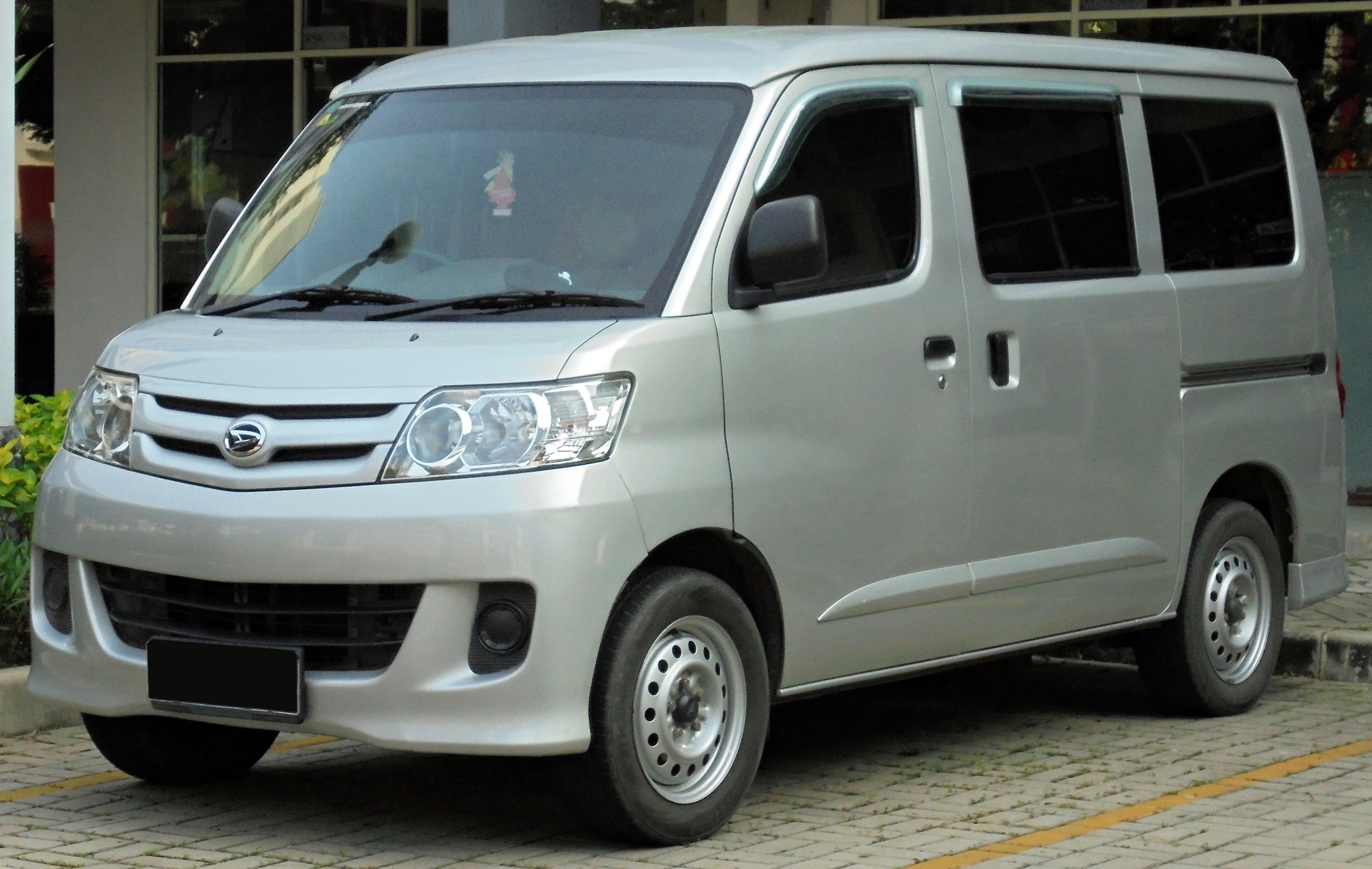
- 2013 Daihatsu Luxio 1.5 D (S402RG, pre-facelift)

Overview
- Manufacturer: Daihatsu
- Model code: S400
- Production: February 2009 – present
- Assembly: Indonesia: Sunter, North Jakarta (ADM)
- Designer: Takuya Saiwaki and Kenyuu Uehata (pre-facelift); Mark Widjaja (2014 facelift)

Body and chassis
- Class: Minivan
- Body style: 5-door minivan
- Layout: Front mid-engine, rear-wheel-drive
- Related: Daihatsu Gran Max

Powertrain
- Engine: Petrol: 1495 cc 3SZ-VE I4 (S402)
- Power output: 71 kW (95 hp; 97 PS)
- Transmission: 5-speed manual; 4-speed automatic

Dimensions
- Wheelbase: 2,650 mm (104.3 in)
- Length: 4,165–4,215 mm (164.0–165.9 in)
- Width: 1,665–1,710 mm (65.6–67.3 in)
- Height: 1,915 mm (75.4 in)
- Kerb weight: 1,290–1,330 kg (2,844–2,932 lb)

Chronology
- Predecessor: Daihatsu Zebra (downmarket variant); Daihatsu Atrai 7 (indirect)

The Daihatsu Luxio is a minivan designed by Daihatsu and manufactured by Astra Daihatsu Motor and sold exclusively in Indonesia. It was launched on 26 February 2009. Based on the Gran Max, Luxio is intended to be the upmarket passenger van version of it. The Luxio shares the same overall body as the commercially oriented Gran Max; however, it features a cosmetically upgraded front and rear, along with trim elements such as side moldings that result in nominal dimensions greater than those of its simpler sibling. The Luxio received a facelift on 19 February 2014.

The Luxio is offered in D, M and X trim levels. The M trim was discontinued with the launch of the facelifted model.

== Powertrain ==
The Luxio is powered by a 1.5–litre 3SZ-VE four-cylinder petrol engine that produces 71 kW (95 hp; 97 PS) at 6,000 rpm and 134 N⋅m (99 lbf⋅ft) of torque at 4,400 rpm. The engine is paired with either a 5-speed manual or a 4-speed automatic gearbox. The latter is only offered on the X trim.

== Safety ==
The two front passengers and outer two passengers for both middle and third row seats have a 3-point seatbelt while the centre passengers for both middle and third row seats have a 2-point one. The Luxio lacks airbags. The optional anti-lock braking system was offered for the pre-facelift model (in M and X trims), but later abolished in the facelift model due to lack of demand.

== Gallery ==
Pre-facelift

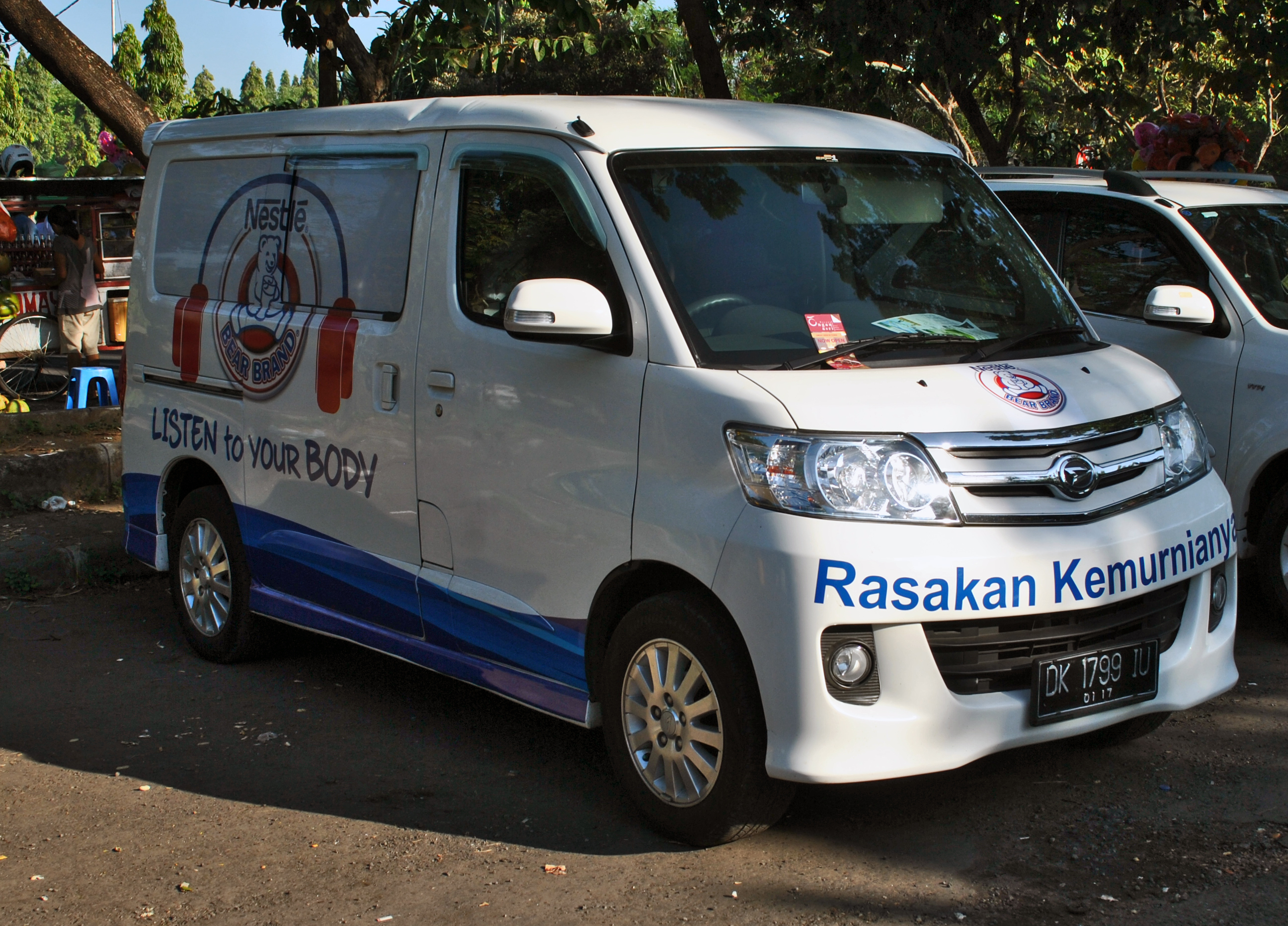
2011 Luxio 1.5 X (S402RG)

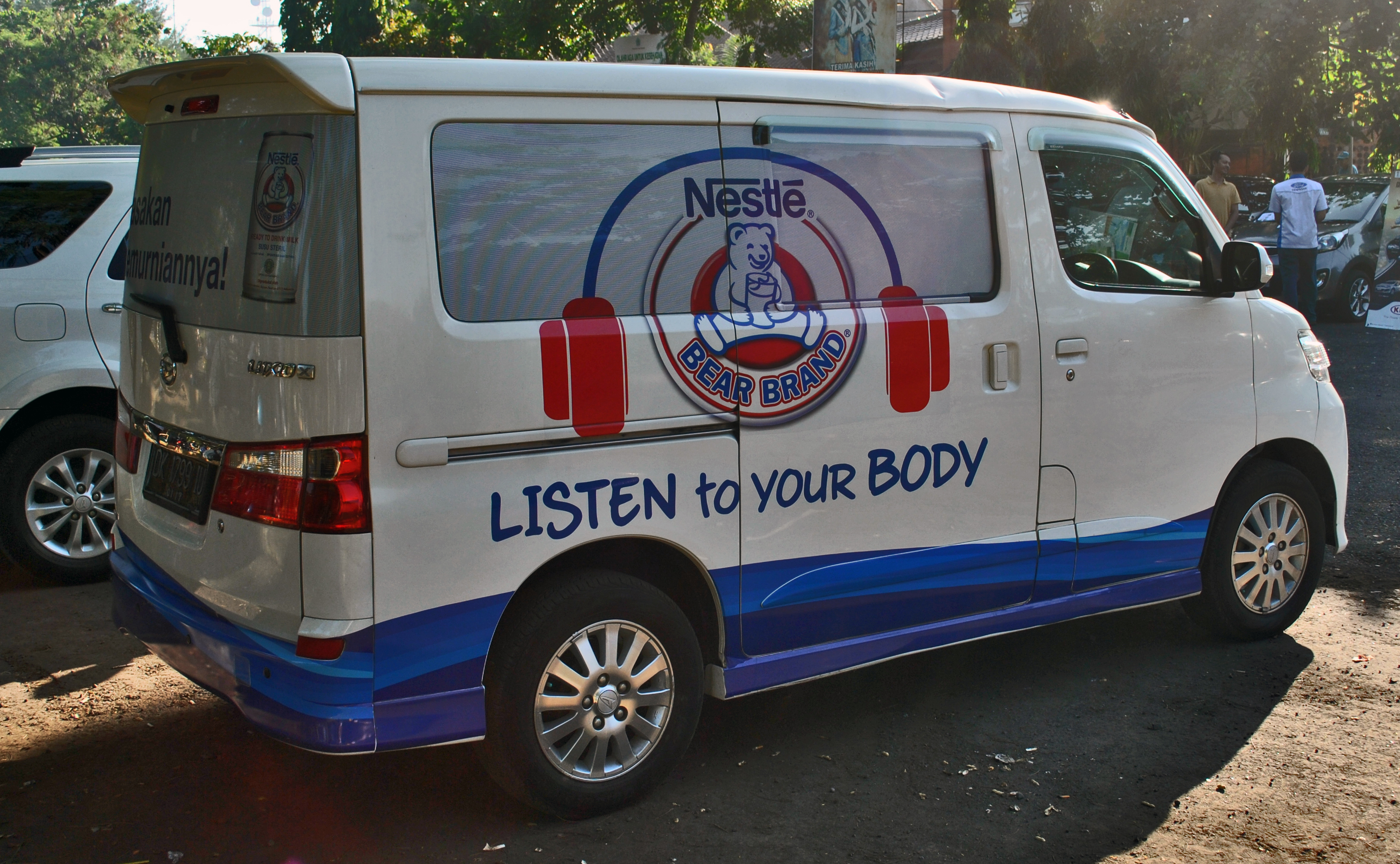
2011 Luxio 1.5 X (S402RG)

Facelift

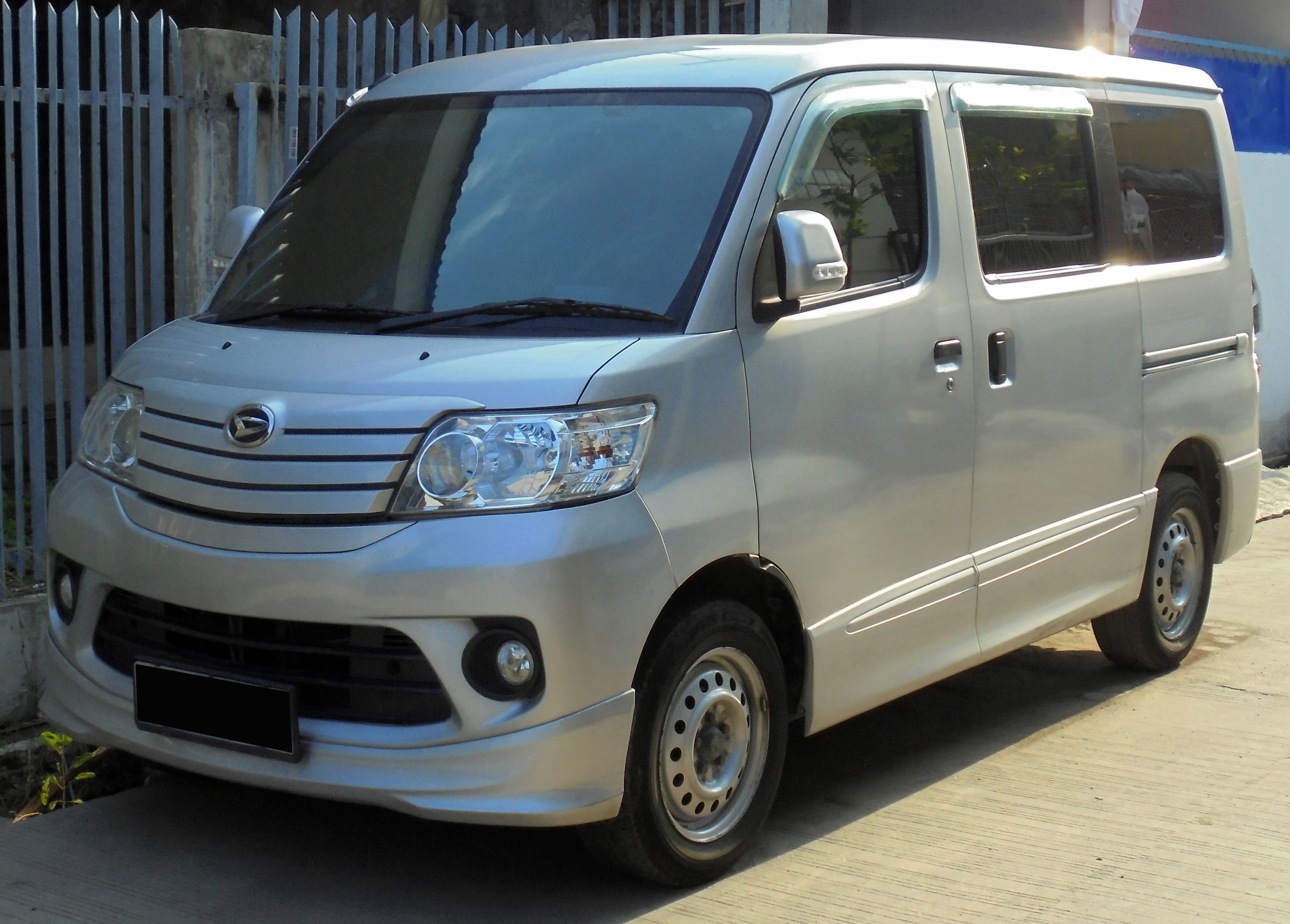
2015 Luxio 1.5 D (S402RG)

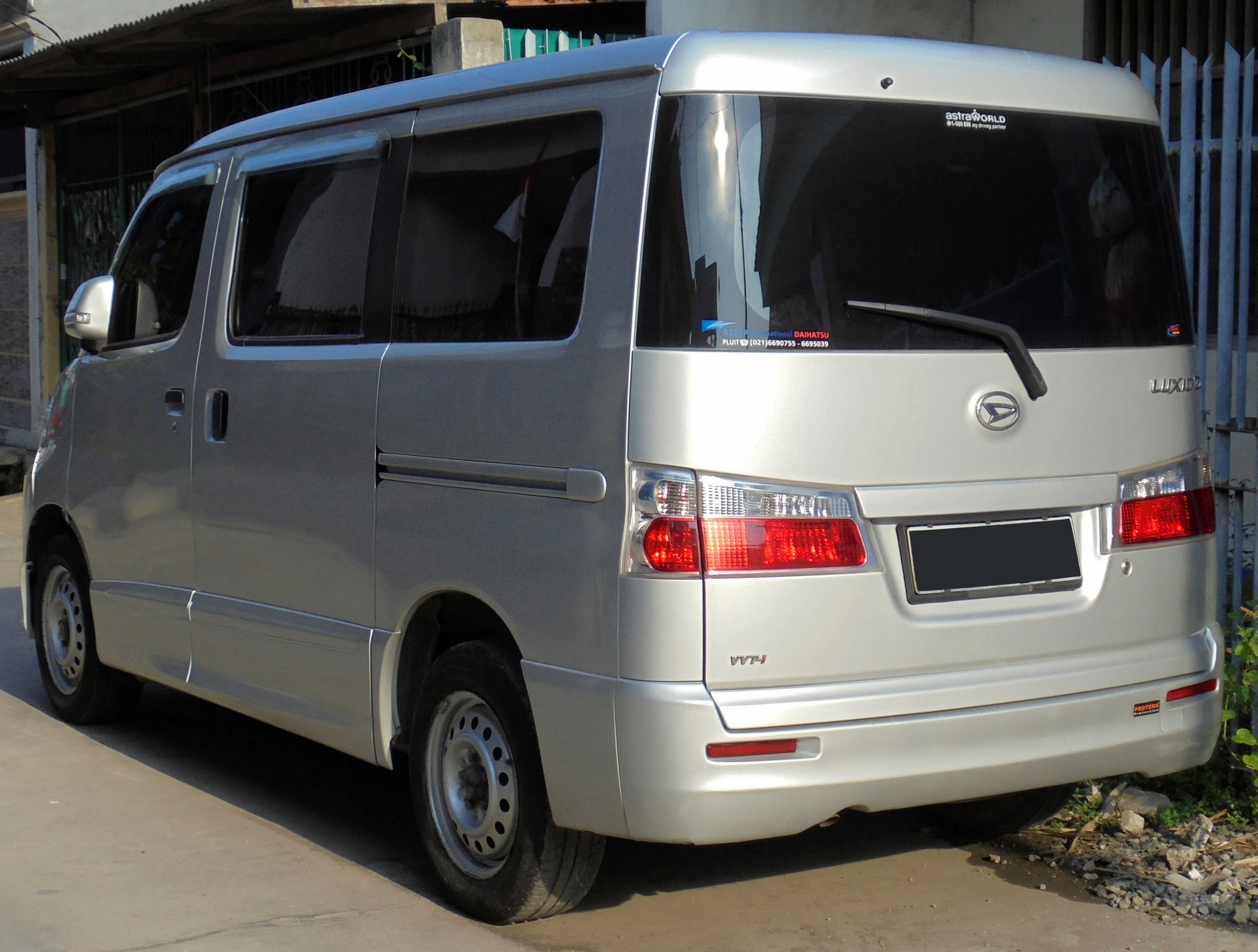
2015 Luxio 1.5 D (S402RG)

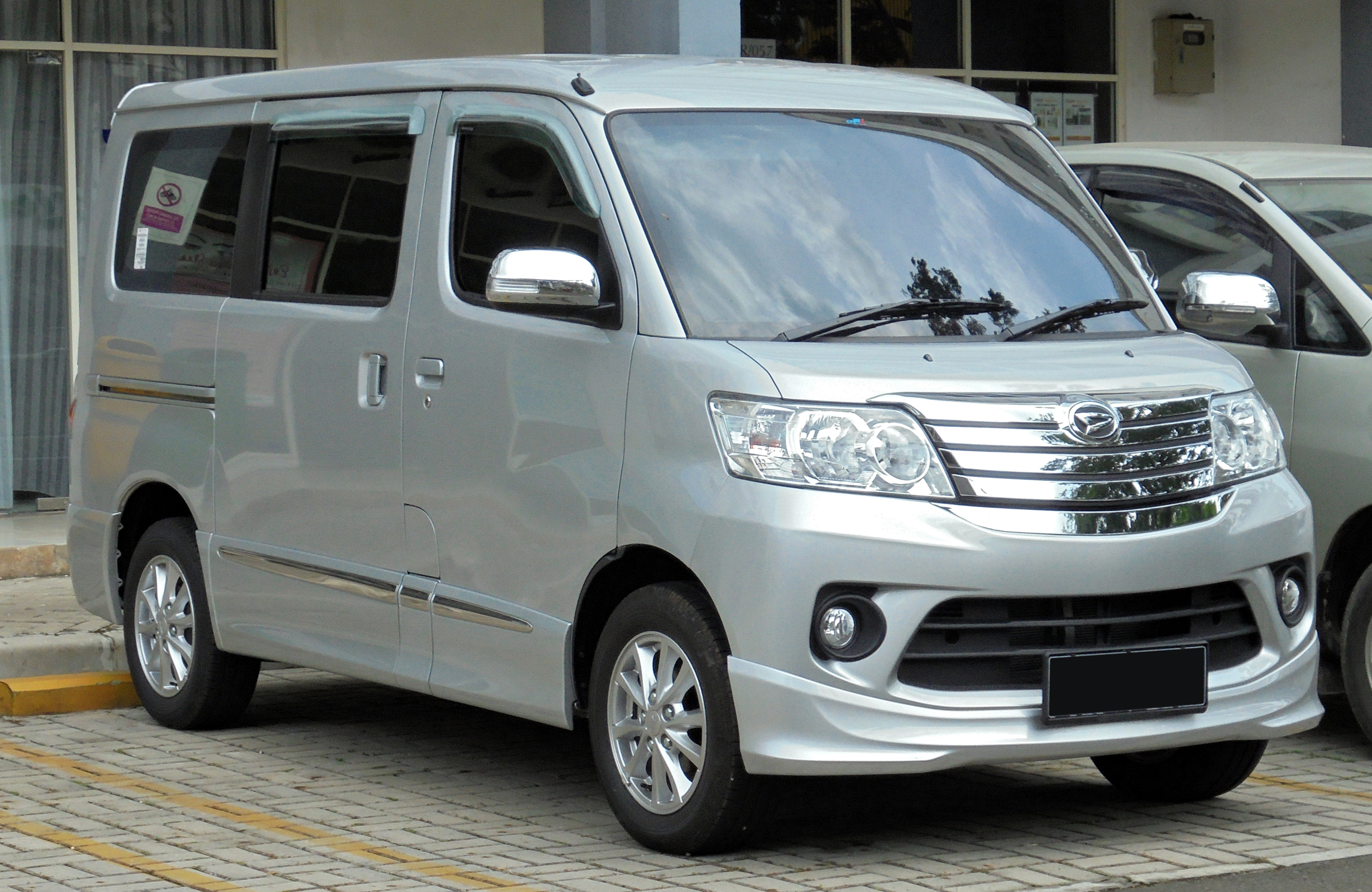
2019 Luxio 1.5 X (S402RG)

== Sales ==
Year	Indonesia
2009	4,582
2010	5,982
2011	6,672
2012	7,309
2013	5,656
2014	4,304
2015	4,232
2016	4,230
2017	5,000
2018	3,841
2019	3,992
2020	1,576
2021	2,451
2022	2,574
2023	2,997
