= Toyota SZ engine =

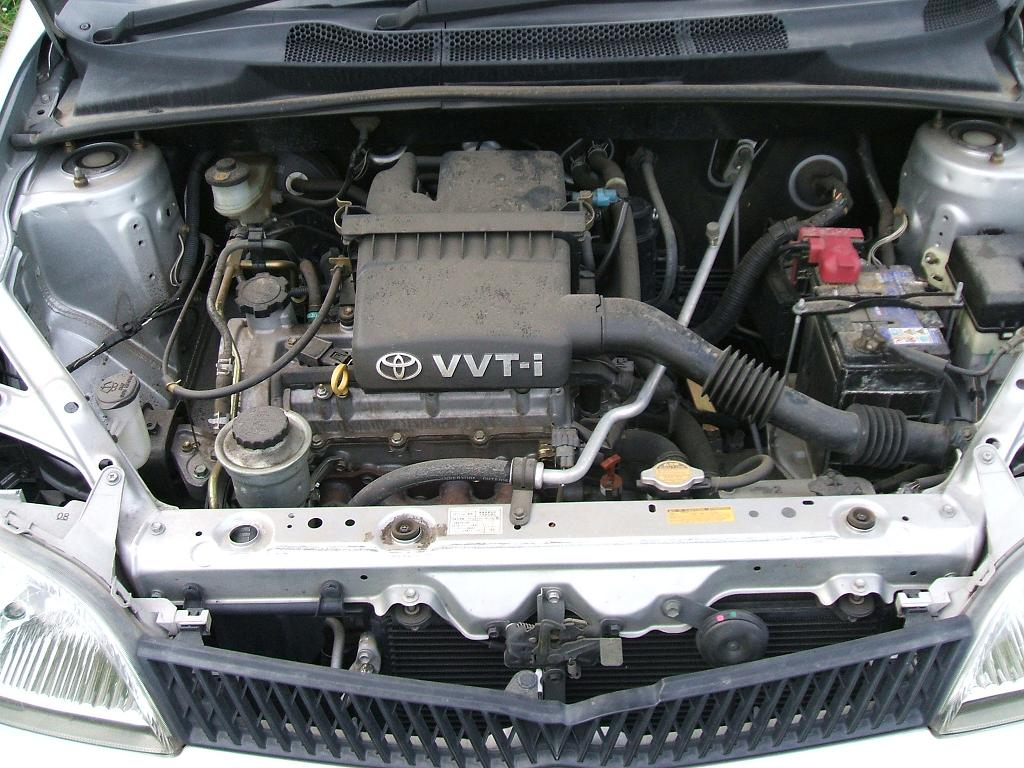
- 1SZ-FE engine in transverse mounting

Overview
- Manufacturer: Daihatsu, Toyota
- Production: 1999–2022

Layout
- Configuration: Naturally aspirated straight-4
- Displacement: 1.0 L (998 cc); 1.3 L (1,296 cc); 1.3 L (1,298 cc); 1.5 L (1,495 cc)
- Cylinder bore: 69.0 mm (2.72 in); 72.0 mm (2.83 in)
- Piston stroke: 66.7 mm (2.63 in); 79.6 mm (3.13 in); 79.7 mm (3.14 in); 91.8 mm (3.61 in)
- Cylinder block material: Cast-iron
- Valvetrain: DOHC 4 valves x cyl. with VVT-i
- Compression ratio: 10.0:1, 11.0:1

RPM range
- Max. engine speed: 6,500 rpm

Combustion
- Fuel system: Electronic fuel injection Port injection
- Fuel type: Petrol
- Cooling system: Water-cooled

Output
- Power output: 50–80 kW (67–107 hp; 68–109 PS)
- Torque output: 90–141 N⋅m (66–104 lbf⋅ft)

Dimensions
- Dry weight: 68–102 kg (150–225 lb)

Chronology
- Predecessor: Toyota E engine Daihatsu H-series engine
- Successor: Toyota NR engine (for some models); Toyota KR engine (I3, for 1SZ-FE)

The Toyota SZ engine family is a series of compact straight-4 piston engines. Toyota Motor Manufacturing (UK) in Deeside produces SZ engines for the Yaris. All three types of the SZ engine are built in Tianjin FAW Toyota Engine Co., Ltd. (TFTE) Plant No. 1 in Xiqing District, Tianjin, China. The 2SZ-FE and 3SZ-VE variations are also manufactured by PT Astra Daihatsu Motor's Karawang Engine Plant in Indonesia.

This engine family has offset crankshaft center to cylinder center-line called the Desaxe, thin-wall cast-iron engine block, single-row chain-operated DOHC 4-valve, variable valve timing that allows Miller cycle operation for partial-throttle condition, and the 1.3L and 1.5L versions have the design to adopt to both longitudinal and transverse mounting. Further, these larger versions also adopt to longitudinal mounting with the engine canted nearly 90° to the left (exhaust-side down) for under-seat horizontal positioning.

== Background ==
Development and manufacturing cooperation between Daihatsu and its part-owner Toyota began in 1998 when Toyota started selling Daihatsu Storia re-badged as Toyota Duet, and in 1999 when Daihatsu installed Toyota's VVT-i variable valve timing system on 1.0L Daihatsu EJ-VE 3-cylinder DOHC engine for Storia/Duet. Also in 1999, Daihatsu developed (with support from Toyota), and started manufacturing 1SZ-FE exclusively for Toyota Vitz/Yaris/Platz/Echo. Based on this 1SZ-FE, two 1.3L versions were developed, 2SZ-FE and K3-VE, using the same crankshaft but different cylinder block and vastly different cylinderhead. By this time, the VVT-i was slightly modified by Daihatsu to be called the DVVT and was used on the K3 engines (except K3-DE).

Based on the K3-VE, three more 1.3L (72.0 x 79.7mm) engines were developed: K3-DE (simplified, 88ps/6,000rpm), K3-VE2 (high-performance, 110ps/7,000rpm), and K3-VET (turbo-charged, 140ps/6,400rpm). Further, a long-stroke naturally-aspirated 1.5L 3SZ-VE (72.0 x 91.8mm), and short-stroke turbo-charged 0.9L KJ-VET (72.0 x 57.5mm, 133ps/7,200rpm, 936.4cc for Boon X4, a 4WD homologation special with intercooler for rally events) were developed based on the K3-VET.

== 1SZ-FE ==
The 1SZ-FE was jointly developed by Toyota and Daihatsu. It has a 4-cylinder inline configuration of 1.0 L (998 cc) displacement with DOHC 4 valves per cylinder. Bore and stroke are 69.0 mm × 66.7 mm (2.72 in × 2.63 in) with a compression ratio of 10.0:1 and electronic port injection.

There are two versions of this engine, one for the Japanese domestic market and another for the rest of the world. Output is 70 ps (51.5 kW) at 6,000rpm with 95 N⋅m (70 lbf⋅ft) of torque at 4,000rpm using JIS 91 octane gasoline and Denso electronics for Japan, and 68 ps (50.0 kW) at 6,000rpm with 90 N⋅m (66 lbf⋅ft) of torque at 4,100rpm using EEC 95 octane petrol and Bosch ancilleries for the rest, all mounted transversely. It features VVT-i, offset-type (Desaxe) crankshaft (which enlarges Intake and Expansion strokes, at the same time reducing the piston side-load during the Expansion stroke for a better thermal and mechanical efficiency) with four counterweights, and narrow-angle valves (18.6° stem-to-stem) operated by roller-type cam-follower arms (finger followers). Valve timing is IN 48° to -12° / -8° to 52° EX 30° / -2° (60 crankshaft-degrees varying range on intake camshaft only).

Bare engine weight without ancillaries of 68 kg (150 lb), and 83 kg (183 lb) with ancillaries, was achieved by using a cast-iron cylinder block produced by 'Cold Box' method with extremely thin walls. The method enables 3mm-thick cylinder walls by placing the block in a chamber filled with catalytic gas during the cooling process at the end of casting, which otherwise incurs distortion in thin structures.

Applications:

- Japan
  - Toyota Vitz/Platz
- Rest of the world
  - Toyota Yaris/Echo

== K3-VE ==
This engine is not a Toyota product, but included in this article for a better illustration in the engine family.

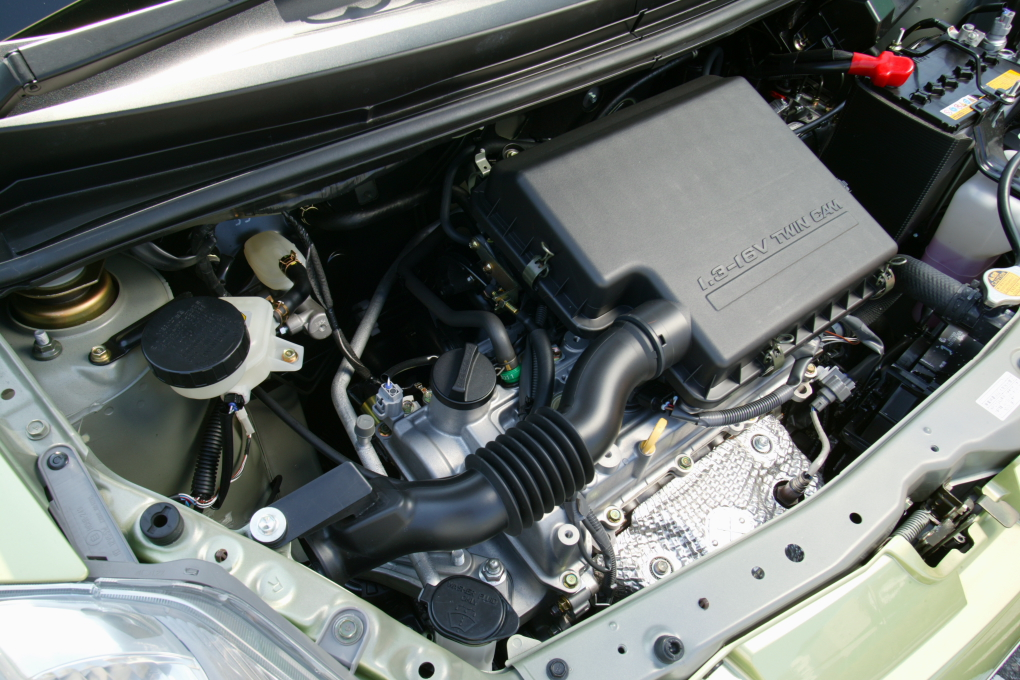
'Toyota' K3-VE LNG version

The K3-VE is an inline four-cylinder 1.3 L (1,298 cc) 4-valve DOHC engine mainly for Daihatsu products, including OEM-supplied Toyota bB/Cami/Avanza and Subaru Dex, with bore and stroke of 72.0mm × 79.7mm, compression ratio of 10.0:1. Output is 90 PS (66 kW; 89 hp) at 6,000rpm with 123 N⋅m of torque at 4,000rpm. This engine shares its crankshaft and other parts with the 2SZ-FE below, but the cylinder block is different to accommodate longitudinal mounting, and the cylinderhead has a wider valve-to-valve angle.

The valve stem-to-stem angle is 29.7°, made directly actuated under the camshafts without the follower arms, with the cam timing of IN 30° to -12° / 10° to 52° EX 30° / -2° (for the DVVT varying range of 42°on the intake side only). These engines do not have valve clearance adjustment mechanism. When a need for adjustment arises, the stem end-cap on top of the valve is replaced with a new part with a different thickness (à la Coventry Climax FWA). The narrow valve-angle engines in the series can adjust the height of finger-follower pivot post.

The engine features DVVT, except for K3-DE model, which is mounted longitudinally and canted nearly 90° to the left in Daihatsu Gran Max and Toyota Xenia/Avanza, that does not have variable valve timing. K3-VE2 is the high-performance version with a compression ratio of 11.0:1, output of 110 PS (81 kW; 108 hp) at 7,000rpm and 126 N⋅m of torque at 4,400rpm. K3-VET is the turbocharged version with a compression ratio of 8.5:1, output of 140 PS (103 kW; 138 hp) at 6,400rpm and 177 N⋅m of torque at 3,200rpm. There is also a LNG version. The Desaxe crankshaft has eight counterweights.

Applications:

- Transversal:
  - Daihatsu YRV (M200)
  - Daihatsu YRV Turbo (K3-VET)
  - Daihatsu Storia/Toyota Duet (M100/M300) (K3-VE or K3-VE2)
  - Daihatsu Boon/Sirion/Toyota Passo (M100/M300) (K3-VE or K3-VE2)
  - Perodua Myvi (M300/M600)
  - Daihatsu Coo/Materia (QNC20)
  - Toyota bB/Subaru Dex (QNC20)
  - Daihatsu Copen (L881, 2006-2011 for Europe)
- Longitudinal (upright):
  - Daihatsu Terios (first generation, 2000-2004) (K3-VE or K3-VET)
  - Toyota Cami (2000-2005) (K3-VE or K3-VET)
  - Perodua Kembara (2000-2008)
  - Daihatsu Xenia/Toyota Avanza (F600) (K3-DE or K3-VE)
- Longitudinal and Horizontal (Canted nearly 90° to the left):
  - Daihatsu Atrai 7/Hijet Gran Cargo/Toyota Sparky (S220)
  - Daihatsu Gran Max (S400) (K3-DE)

== 2SZ-FE ==
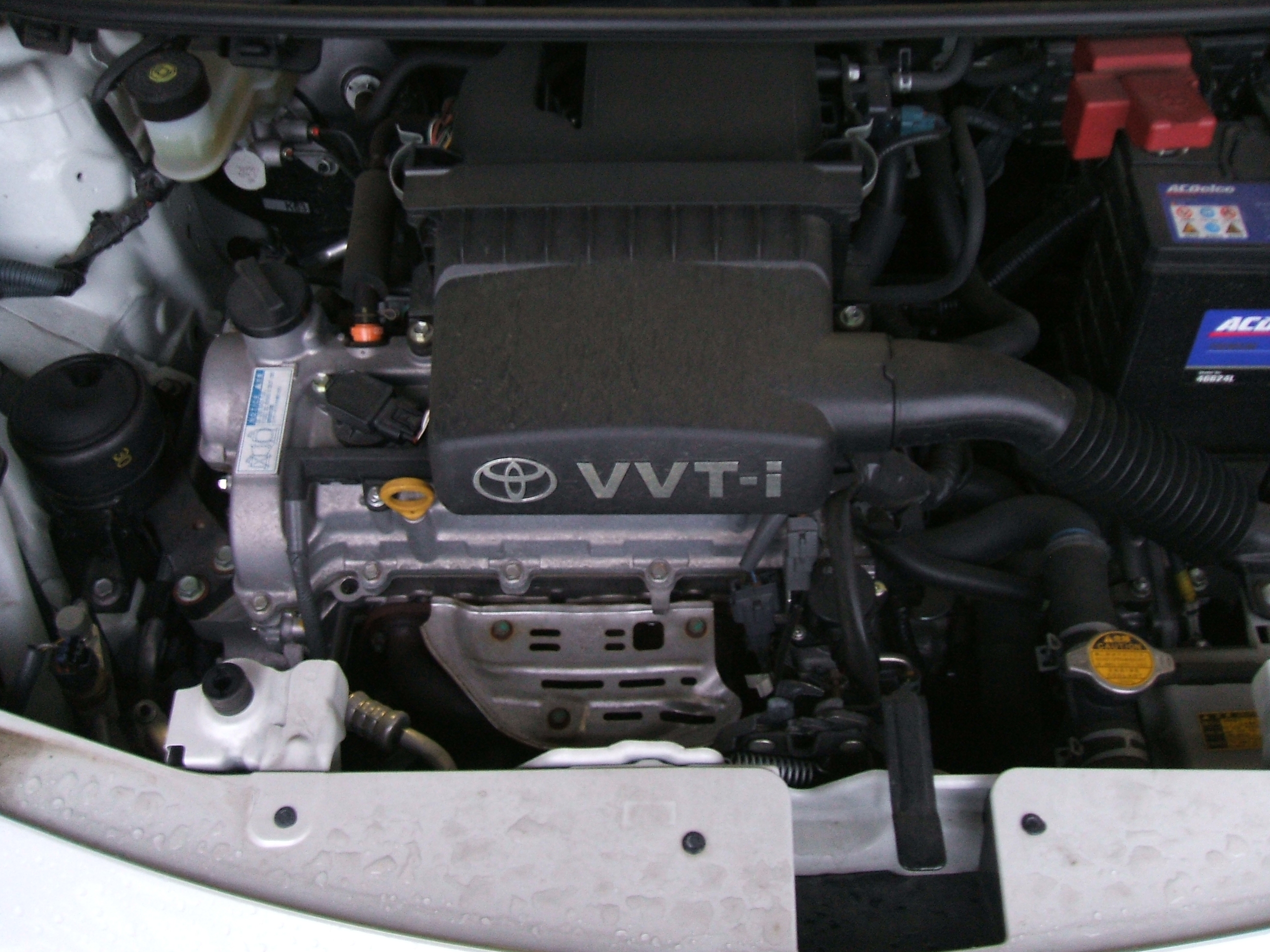
2SZ-FE in transverse mounting

The 2SZ-FE is an inline four-cylinder 1,298 cc (1.3 L) engine with bore and stroke of 72.0 mm × 79.7 mm (2.83 in × 3.14 in), with a compression ratio of 10.0:1 for the export markets, and 1,296 cc (1.3 L) with bore and stroke of 72.0 mm × 79.6 mm (2.83 in × 3.13 in), with a compression ratio of 11.0:1 for the Japanese market. Output is 87 PS (64 kW; 86 hp) at 6,000rpm with 122 N⋅m (90 lbf⋅ft) of torque at 4,200rpm for export, and 87 PS (64 kW; 86 hp) at 6,000rpm with 116 N⋅m (86 lbf⋅ft) of torque at 4,000rpm for Japan. The engine features VVT-i variable valve timing system. The export version is usually known as the 4A13 in China.

Features are: VVT-i, Desaxe crankshaft with four counterweights for export, eight counterweights for Japan, thin-wall cast-iron cylinder block, and the narrow-angle valves (18.6° stem-to-stem) operated via roller cam-follower arms by DOHC (same as in 1SZ-FE). The Japan version further differs by having additional spacer plates in the water jacket for optimal cooling, polymer coating on piston skirts, and a radically different cam timing (IN 33° to -12° / 35° to 80° EX 40° / -2°) with 45° VVT-i adjustment range.

Applications:

- Transversal:
  - Toyota Yaris/Toyota Vitz (XP10/XP90)
  - Toyota Belta
  - Toyota Ractis (XP100)

== 3SZ-VE ==
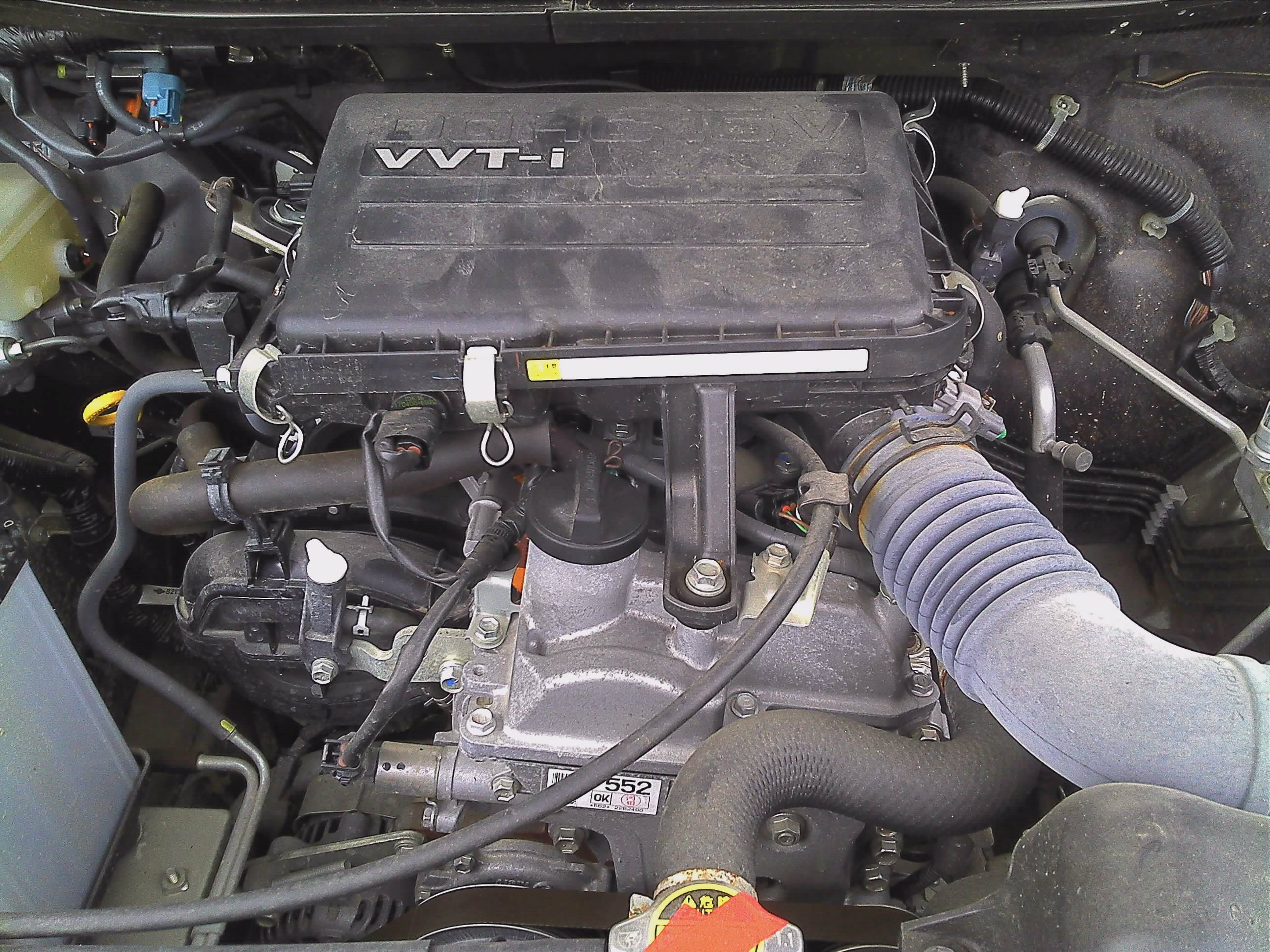
3SZ-VE in longitudinal mounting

The 3SZ-VE is a 1.5 L (1,495 cc) inline 4-cylinder engine with four valves per cylinder introduced in October 2005. First installed in 2005 on the second generation Daihatsu Terios. Bore and stroke are 72.0 mm × 91.8 mm (2.83 in × 3.61 in), with a compression ratio of 10.0:1. Output is 109 PS (80 kW; 108 hp) at 6,000rpm with 141 N⋅m (104 lbf⋅ft) of torque at 4,400rpm for the Japanese market, and 107 PS (79 kW; 106 hp) at 6,000rpm with 141 N⋅m (104 lbf⋅ft) of torque at 4,400rpm for the rest of the world. The Commercial variant in Daihatsu Luxio and Daihatsu Gran Max has output of 97 PS (71 kW; 96 hp) at 6,000rpm with 134 N⋅m (99 lbf⋅ft) of torque at 4,400rpm without the VVT-i.

In addition to the series-common combination of offset Desaxe crankshaft and VVT-i for a high thermal efficiency, this 1.5 Liter DOHC 3SZ-VE has unusually long connecting rods to avoid the high rpm vibration (due to secondary imbalance, that can be reduced with a longer conrod) often associated with long-stroke engines. Compared to the 1.3L 2SZ-FE that shares the same 72.0mm bore size, the stroke is 12.2mm longer with eight counterweights on the crankshaft, and the conrod center-to-center length is 18.5mm longer, more than 50% longer than the increase in stroke that is normally required.

In order to accommodate this long conrod in addition to the increased stroke, the deck height (distance from the crankshaft center to the top of cylinder block) was increased by 25.5mm, making the engine assembly taller. This unique design (comparable to Formula One and other racing engines, or, 2.0L Volvo B5204 five-cylinder that has the same deck-height as the 2.3L version because of its modular design) enabled the same 6,500rpm redline as the 1.0L and 1.3L versions despite a vastly different bore-to-stroke ratio.

To cope with the increase in intake and exhaust flow volume, the intake valve size was increased from 26.1mm to 27.8mm, and the exhaust valve size was increased from 22.6mm to 23.4mm, which necessitated the use of small 12mm spark plugs. Model-specific pistons to clear the valves (and for a larger combustion chamber volume) have the polymer coating on the skirts to reduce friction. Throttle butterfly diameter was increased from 45mm of the 1.3L to 50mm, and the cam timing and lift are made more aggressive (Duration of 230° from 220°, lift of IN8.0mm/EX6.7mm from IN7.2mm/EX6.7mm, timing of IN 30° to -12° / 10° to 52° EX 30° / 2°). The valve stem-to-stem angle was 29.7°, directly actuated under the camshafts as in K3-VE without the follower arms.

Applications:

- Transversal:
  - Daihatsu Sirion
  - Daihatsu Materia/Coo
  - Toyota bB
  - Toyota Passo Sette
  - Perodua Alza (M500) (2009–2022)
  - Perodua Myvi SE/Myvi Advance (2011–2017)
  - Toyota Vios (China)
- Longitudinal (upright):
  - Toyota Rush
  - Toyota Avanza (F600, F650) (1.5-litre variants)
  - Daihatsu Terios/Be-go
  - Perodua Nautica
- Longitudinal and Horizontal (Canted nearly 90° to the left):
  - Daihatsu Gran Max (1.5-litre variants)
  - Daihatsu Luxio (S400)
  - Toyota TownAce/LiteAce (2008–2020)

== See also ==
- List of Toyota engines
