= Daihatsu YRV =

Daihatsu YRV (M200)
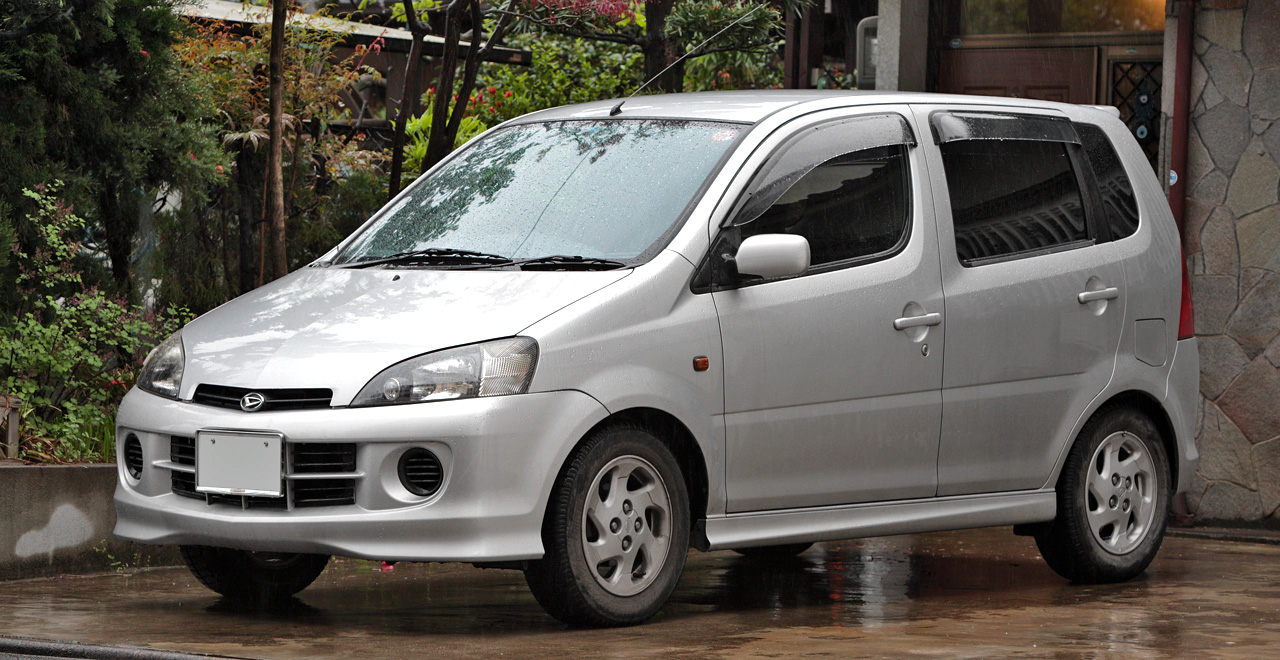

Overview
- Manufacturer: Daihatsu
- Production: August 2000 – September 2005
- Assembly: Japan
- Designer: Aisaka Tadashi and Hirofumi Ishizaki

Body and chassis
- Class: Mini MPV
- Body style: 5-door hatchback
- Layout: Front-engine, front-wheel-drive; Front-engine, four-wheel-drive
- Related: Daihatsu Storia

Powertrain
- Engine: gasoline: 989 cc EJ-VE I3; 1.3 L K3-VE I4; 1.3 L K3-VET turbo I4
- Power output: 47 kW (63 hp; 64 PS) (EJ-VE); 66 kW (89 hp; 90 PS) (K3-VE); 103 kW (138 hp; 140 PS) (K3-VET)
- Transmission: 5-speed manual; 4-speed automatic

Dimensions
- Wheelbase: 2,370 mm (93.3 in)
- Length: 3,765 mm (148.2 in)
- Width: 1,620 mm (63.8 in)
- Height: 1,535–1,565 mm (60.4–61.6 in)
- Curb weight: 860–990 kg (1,896–2,183 lb)

Chronology
- Predecessor: Daihatsu Pyzar/Gran Move
- Successor: Daihatsu Coo/Materia

The Daihatsu YRV (Japanese: ダイハツ・YRV (ワイアールブイ), Daihatsu Waiārubui) was a mini MPV which was manufactured by the Japanese automaker Daihatsu from 2000 to 2005. The name "YRV" is an abbreviation for "Young Recreational Vehicle". The YRV is based on the contemporary Daihatsu Storia/Sirion; it offered a sportier character, nimbler handling, and more powerful engine options than its period competitors in the Japanese market.

== Engines and trim levels ==
A four-wheel drive system named "4Trak" is available only with the 1.3 L K3-VE engine internationally. A Japanese domestic market turbocharged version was also available. All other versions are equipped with front-wheel drive system. There was also the F-Speed semi-automatic transmission version. The gear shifter was mounted on the steering column (called a "dashboard shift" by Daihatsu); along with minor updates in December 2001, the YRV Turbo received the more common, floor-mounted shifter instead.

While the handling had been described as "European" in the Japanese domestic market, the turbocharged YRV was deemed to need additional tuning. The new engine was mounted in a Sirion for initial testing, and then the YRV underwent more testing and modification before going on sale in Europe. A premium specification was also available; this featured the naturally aspirated K3-VE engine, side skirts and five-spoke alloy wheels. This version was the highest selling YRV specification of the three in the United Kingdom and remains the most common variant there.

The YRV has an option for an electronically controlled 4-speed automatic transmission. The YRV Turbo comes with this transmission as standard equipment, without a manual gearbox option. The YRV transmissions had tight size limitations to enable a small turning circle, and the manual version did not have a sufficient torque rating for the turbo engine.

A four-wheel drive Japanese domestic market version was available at launch and up until discontinuation in 2005. This version had a turbocharged 1.3 L K3-VET engine producing 140 PS (103 kW), however, electronically controlled paddle-shift 4-speed automatic transmission with a column shifter lever was the only gearbox available for this model. The gear lever was moved to the floor with the December 2001 facelift.

== Gallery ==
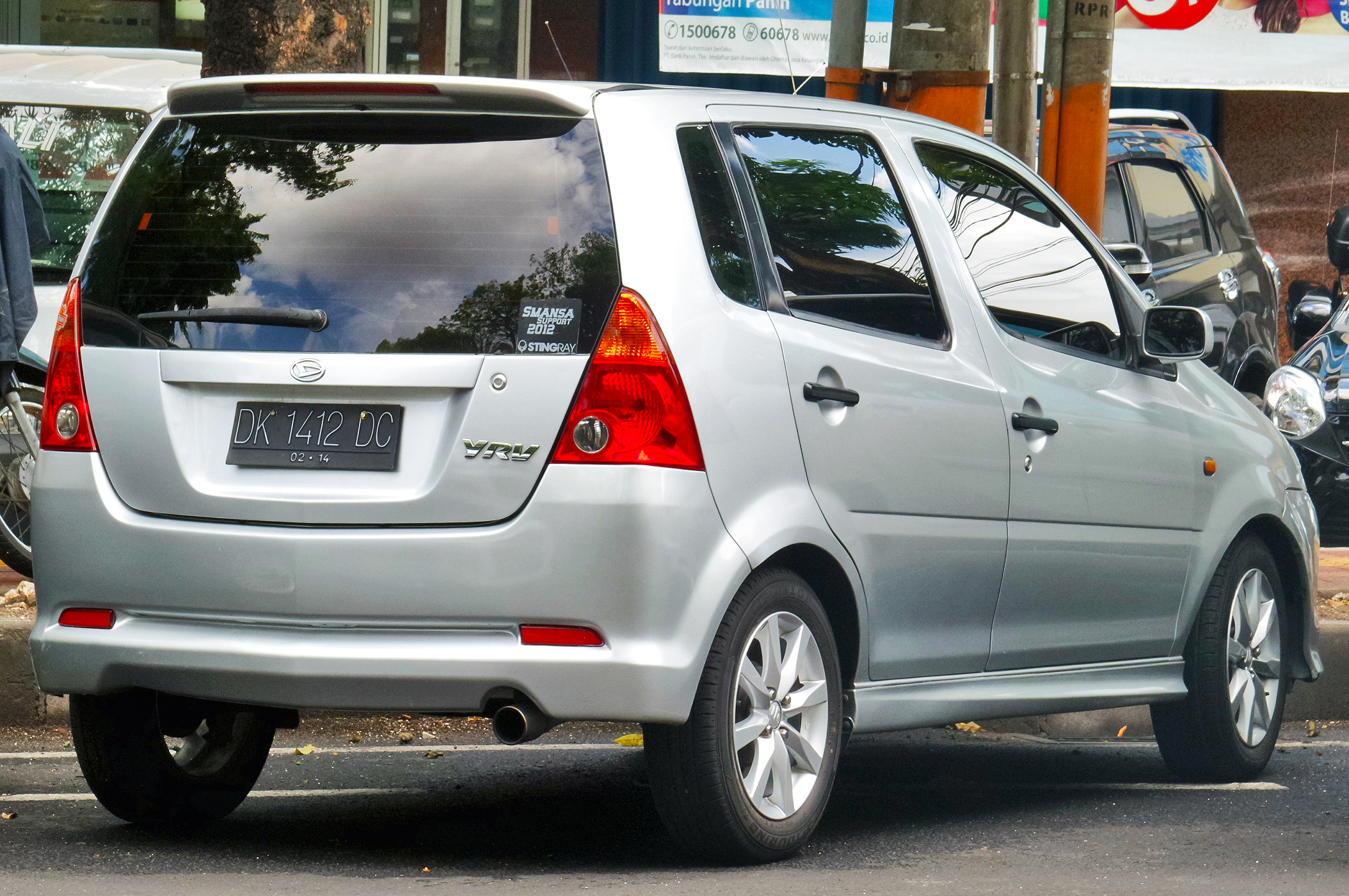
Rear view (early model)

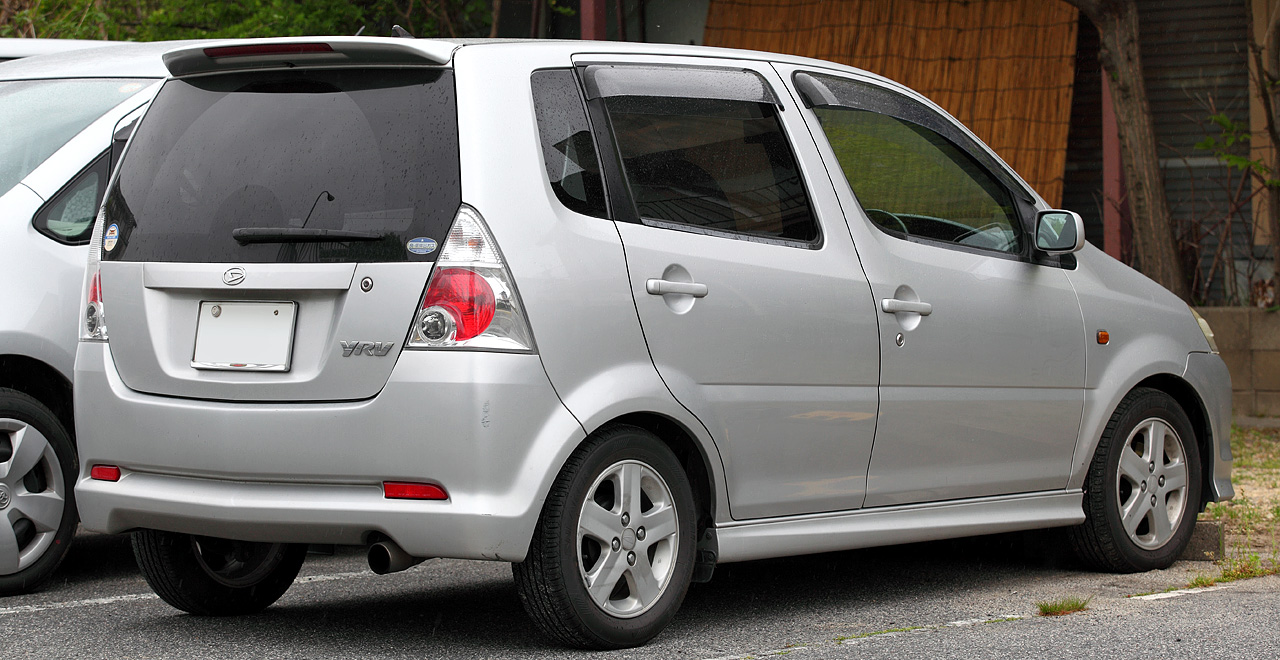
Rear view (late model)

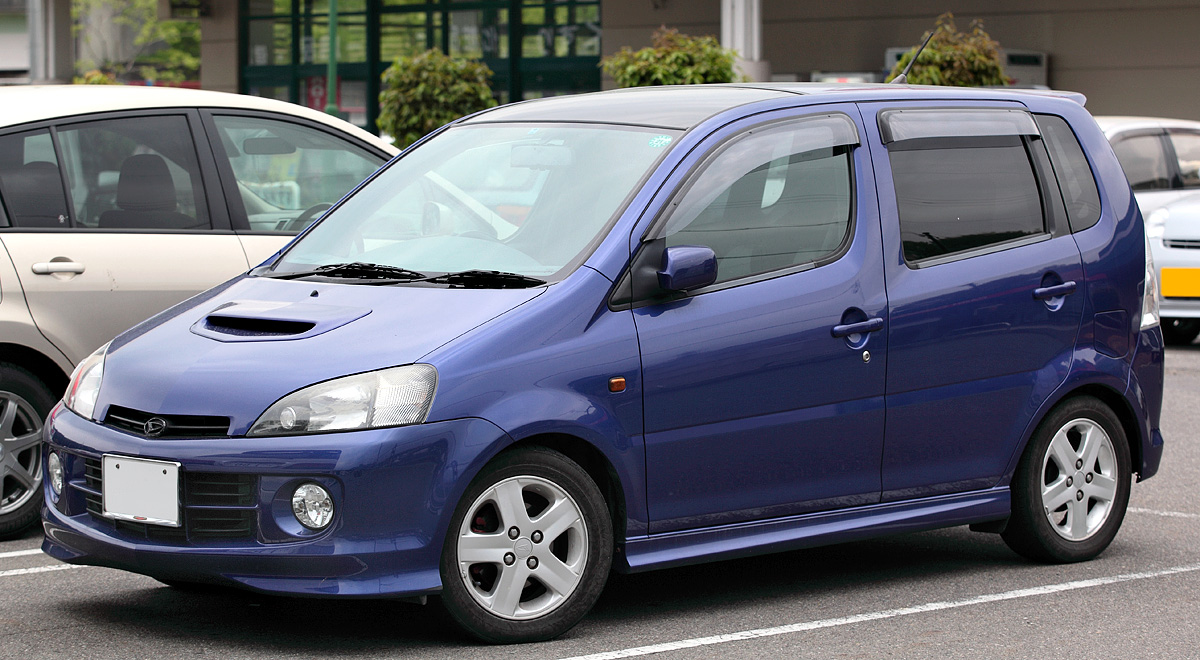
Daihatsu YRV Turbo

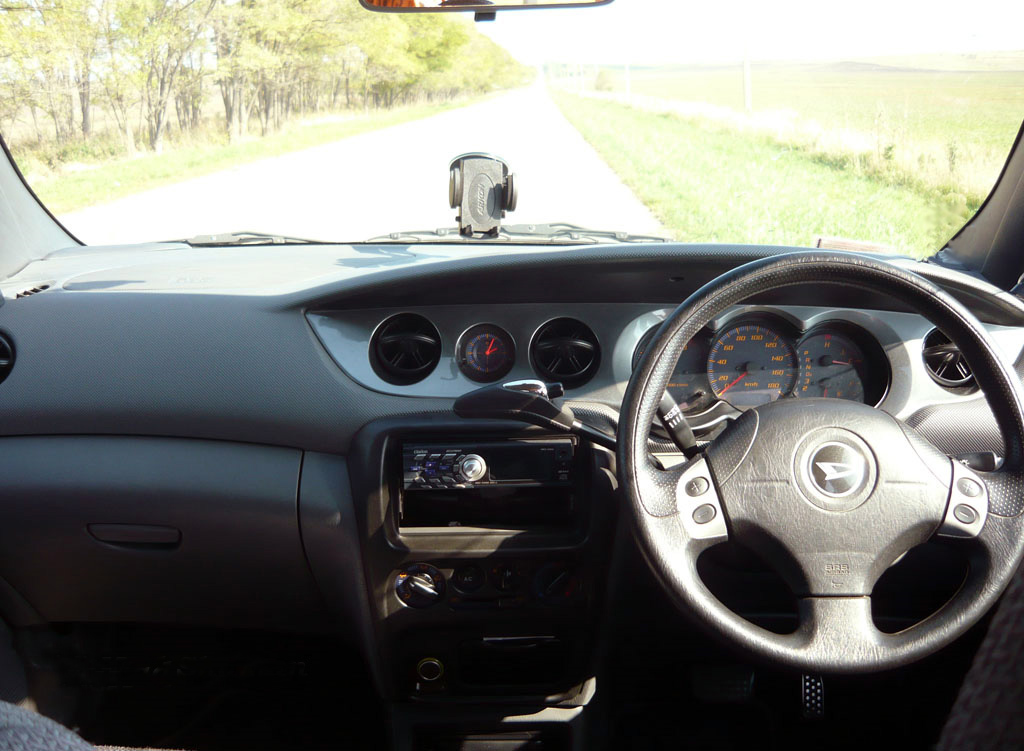
Interior
