= Daihatsu Gran Max =

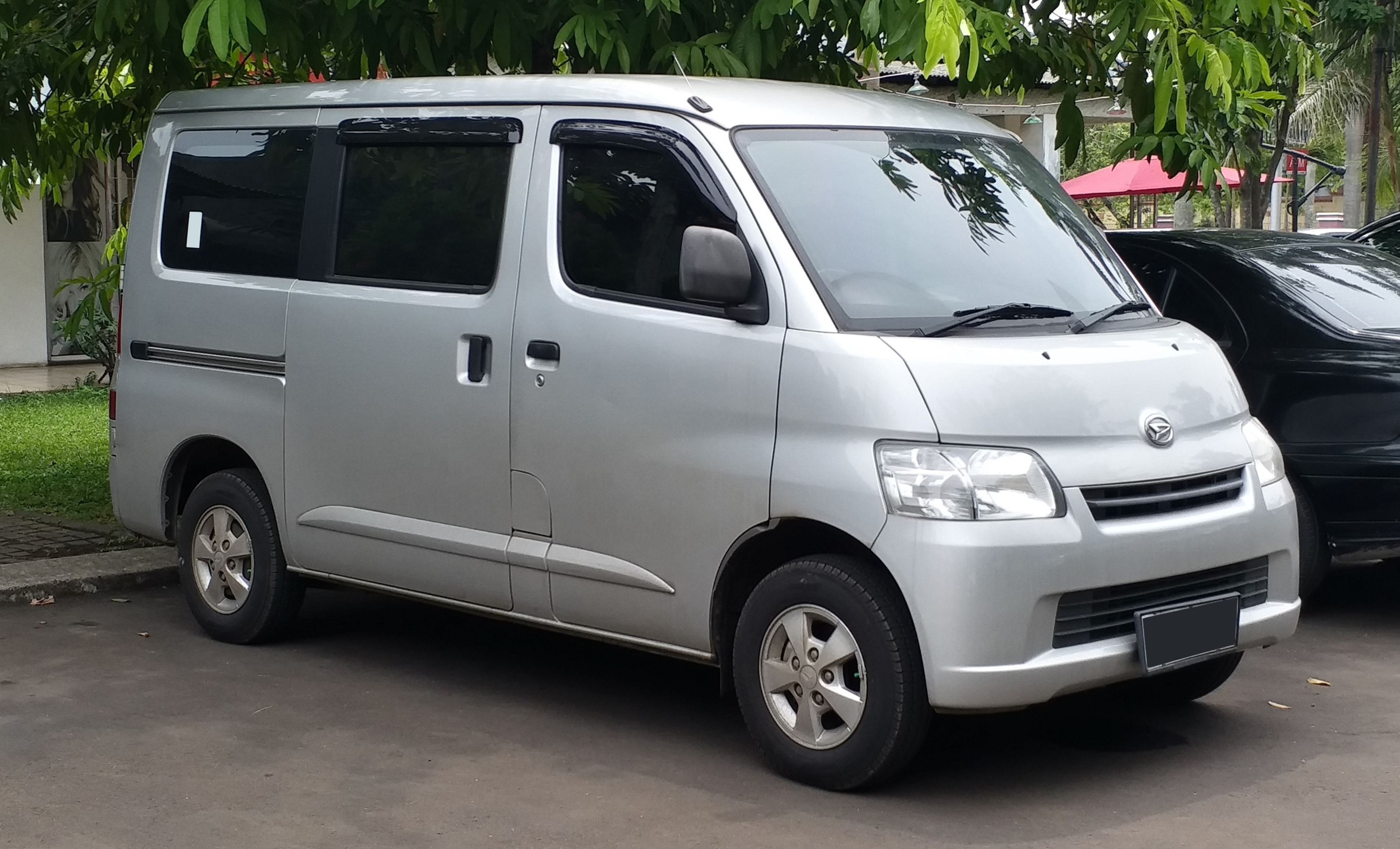
- 2015 Daihatsu Gran Max 1.3 D van (S401RV; pre-facelift, Indonesia)

Overview
- Manufacturer: Daihatsu
- Model code: S400
- Also called: Toyota LiteAce/TownAce; Mazda Bongo (Japan, 2020–present)
- Production: October 2007 – present
- Assembly: Indonesia: Sunter, North Jakarta (ADM); Taiwan: Guanyin (Kuozui Motors, Town Ace only)
- Designer: Toshiaki Okamoto and Kenyuu Uehata

Body and chassis
- Class: Light commercial vehicle
- Body style: 5-door van/panel van; 2-door pickup
- Layout: Front mid-engine, rear-wheel-drive; Front mid-engine, four-wheel-drive (Japan)
- Related: Daihatsu Luxio

Powertrain
- Engine: Petrol: 1298 cc K3-DE I4 (S401); 1495 cc 3SZ-VE I4 (S402/S412); 1496 cc 2NR-VE I4 (S403/S413)
- Power output: 65 kW (87 hp; 88 PS) (K3-DE); 71 kW (95 hp; 97 PS) (3SZ-VE/2NR-VE)
- Transmission: 5-speed manual; 4-speed automatic

Dimensions
- Wheelbase: 2,650 mm (104.3 in)
- Length: 4,045–4,065 mm (159.3–160.0 in) (Cargo/Van); 4,195–4,295 mm (165.2–169.1 in) (Truck/Pickup)
- Width: 1,665 mm (65.6 in) (Cargo/Van); 1,665–1,675 mm (65.6–65.9 in) (Truck/Pickup)
- Height: 1,900–1,930 mm (74.8–76.0 in) (Cargo/Van); 1,850–2,070 mm (72.8–81.5 in) (Truck/Pickup)
- Kerb weight: 1,270–1,350 kg (2,800–2,976 lb) (Cargo/Van); 1,160–1,230 kg (2,557–2,712 lb) (Truck/Pickup)

Chronology
- Predecessor: Daihatsu Zebra (Indonesia); Daihatsu Hijet Grancargo/Extol (van, indirect); Toyota LiteAce/TownAce (R40/R50) (LiteAce/TownAce Van); Toyota LiteAce/TownAce (M30/M40/M50/M60/M70/M80) (LiteAce/TownAce Van/Truck); Mazda Bongo (SK/SL) (Bongo); Perodua Rusa (Malaysia)

The Daihatsu Gran Max (Japanese: ダイハツ・グランマックス, Hepburn: Daihatsu Guranmakkusu) is a series of light commercial vehicles (vans and pickup trucks) produced and sold by the Japanese automaker Daihatsu since late 2007. It is also rebadged and marketed by Toyota as the Toyota LiteAce and Toyota TownAce since 2008, and by Mazda in Japan as the Mazda Bongo since 2020.

== Overview ==
Developed by Daihatsu under the lead of chief engineer Masaharu Tezeni, the Gran Max was released in November 2007 as the replacement of the Indonesian market Zebra of similar size. It also replaced the Perodua Rusa in Malaysia. It is similar to the tenth-generation Hijet Cargo by its "semi-cab" configuration (front wheels located forward of the door) for both the van and pickup models. Produced in Indonesia by Astra Daihatsu Motor, it is powered by 1,298 cc (K3-DE EFI), 1,495 cc (3SZ-VE VVT-i) and 1,496 cc (2NR-VE Dual VVT-i, since 2020) petrol engines and is both wider and longer than the kei car-sized Hijet.

== Markets ==
=== Indonesia ===
The Gran Max was launched in Indonesia on 6 November 2007 as the successor to the aging Zebra Espass pickup and commercial van. It was initially available with 1.3-litre K3-DE and 1.5-litre 3SZ-VE petrol engines. Both engines were only paired with a 5-speed manual transmission.

In August 2022, the 3SZ-VE engine option was replaced by the newer 2NR-VE unit. Other improvements include an updated four-spoke steering wheel, additional cup holder, electric power steering, larger 14-inch alloy wheels, and a higher ground clearance by 15 mm (0.6 in). No other changes were made to the exterior.

In September 2025, the Gran Max gets a new variant: the 1.5 Blind Van AC-PS with a 4-speed automatic transmission. The variant comes equipped with dual front SRS Airbags, retractable seatbelt with pretensioner and force limiter, ABS with EBD, ESC and immobiliser, as well as sliding seat with adjustable front headrest, complete HVAC system with adjustable feet ventilation, front defogger and heater, headlamp levelling, fuel lid opener and a set of four larger 14-inch steel wheels, that makes it 15 mm (0.6 in) higher on ground clearance.

=== Japan ===
Since February 2008, the Gran Max has been exported to Japan where it was firstly sold as the Toyota LiteAce/TownAce, which is positioned below the HiAce. With the facelifted model released in 2020, the LiteAce-badged model was discontinued due to integration of Japanese Toyota dealers. At the same time, Daihatsu started selling the vehicle in Japan as the Gran Max, slotting it above the Hijet kei vehicles. It is the first captive import product in the Japanese Daihatsu lineup. It is also exported to Japan under Mazda brand as the Bongo, which replaced the previous Mazda-built models. These models are offered with optional collision avoidance system marketed as Smart Assist.

=== Taiwan ===
The Town Ace pickup was launched for pre-sale in Taiwan in November 2021, and has been assembled locally by Kuozui Motors in Guanyin. Deliveries started in February 2022. The top grade is available with collision avoidance system marketed as Toyota Safety Sense. In October 2022, the company started to take pre-orders for the van model.

=== Philippines ===
In the Philippines, the Lite Ace was launched on 15 July 2022 with the 1.5-litre 2NR-VE engine and a 5-speed manual transmission only. It is available in Pickup, Panel Van, FX Utility Van and Cargo Aluminum Van models (the latter two were added in August 2022).

=== GCC ===
The Lite Ace van was released in GCC countries such as Saudi Arabia and the UAE in July 2022 with the 1.5-litre 2NR-VE engine and a 4-speed automatic transmission.

== Gallery ==
Gran Max

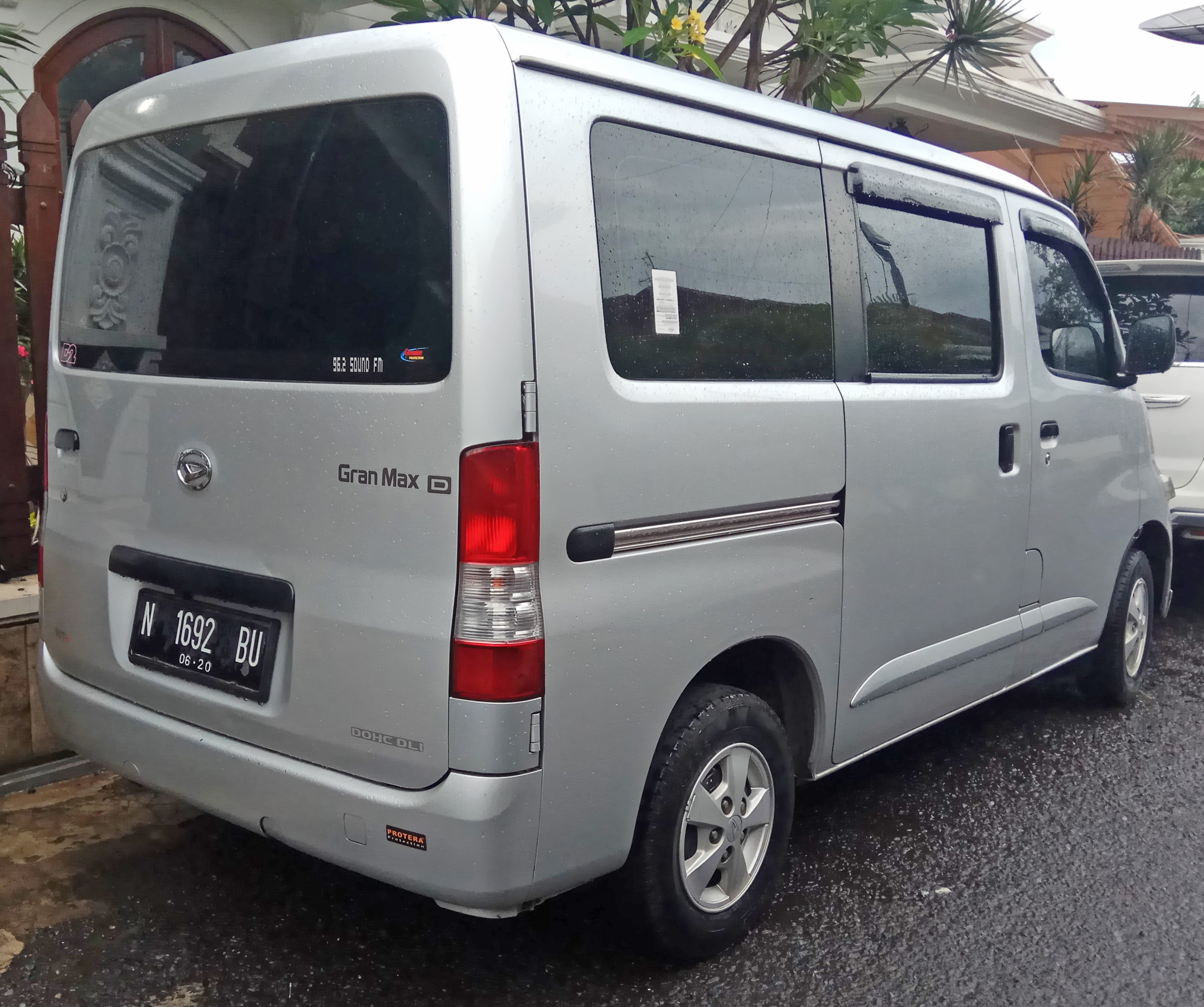
2015 Gran Max 1.5 D van (S402RV; pre-facelift, Indonesia)

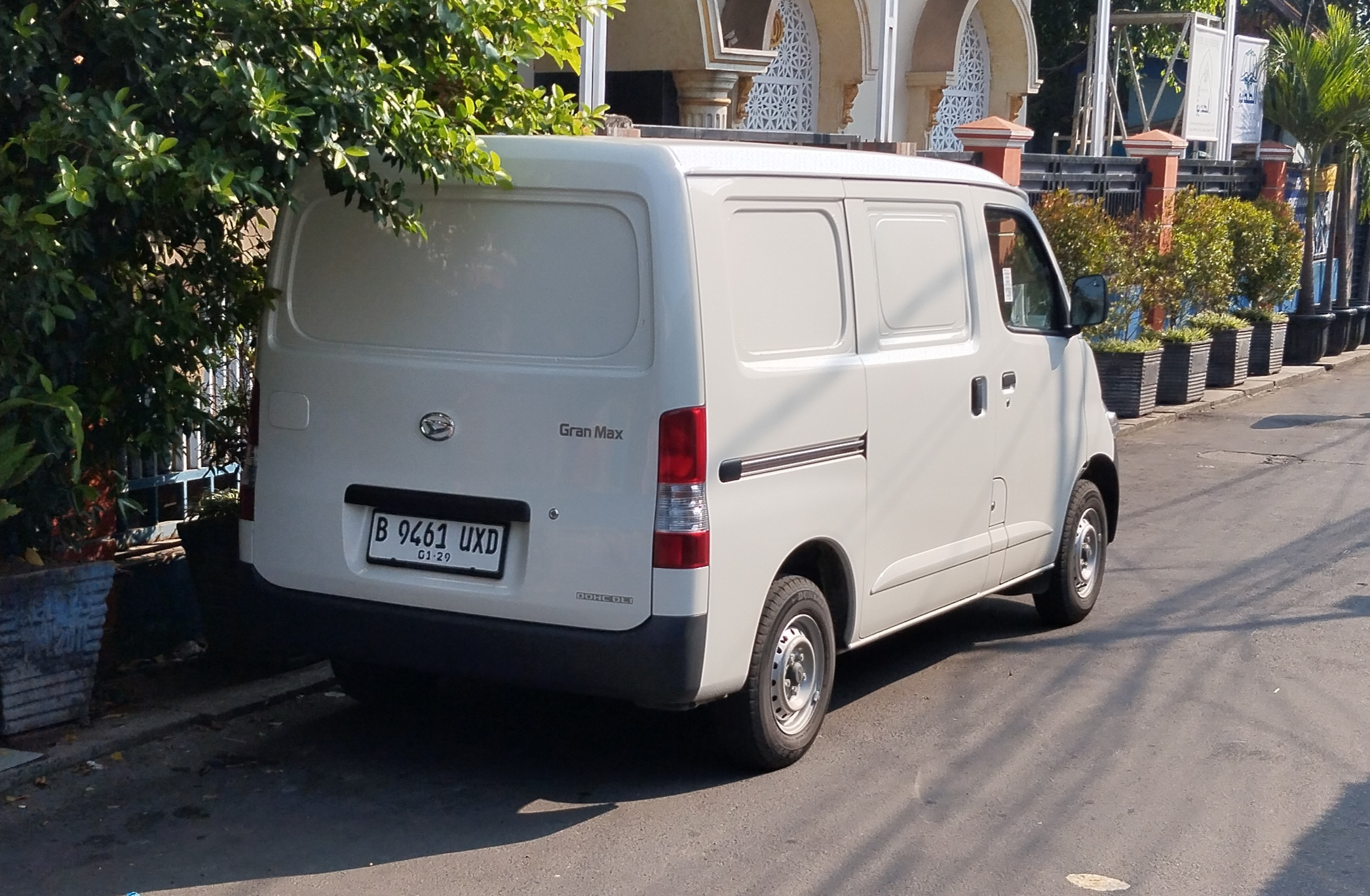
2024 Gran Max 1.3 Blind Van (S401RV; pre-facelift, Indonesia)

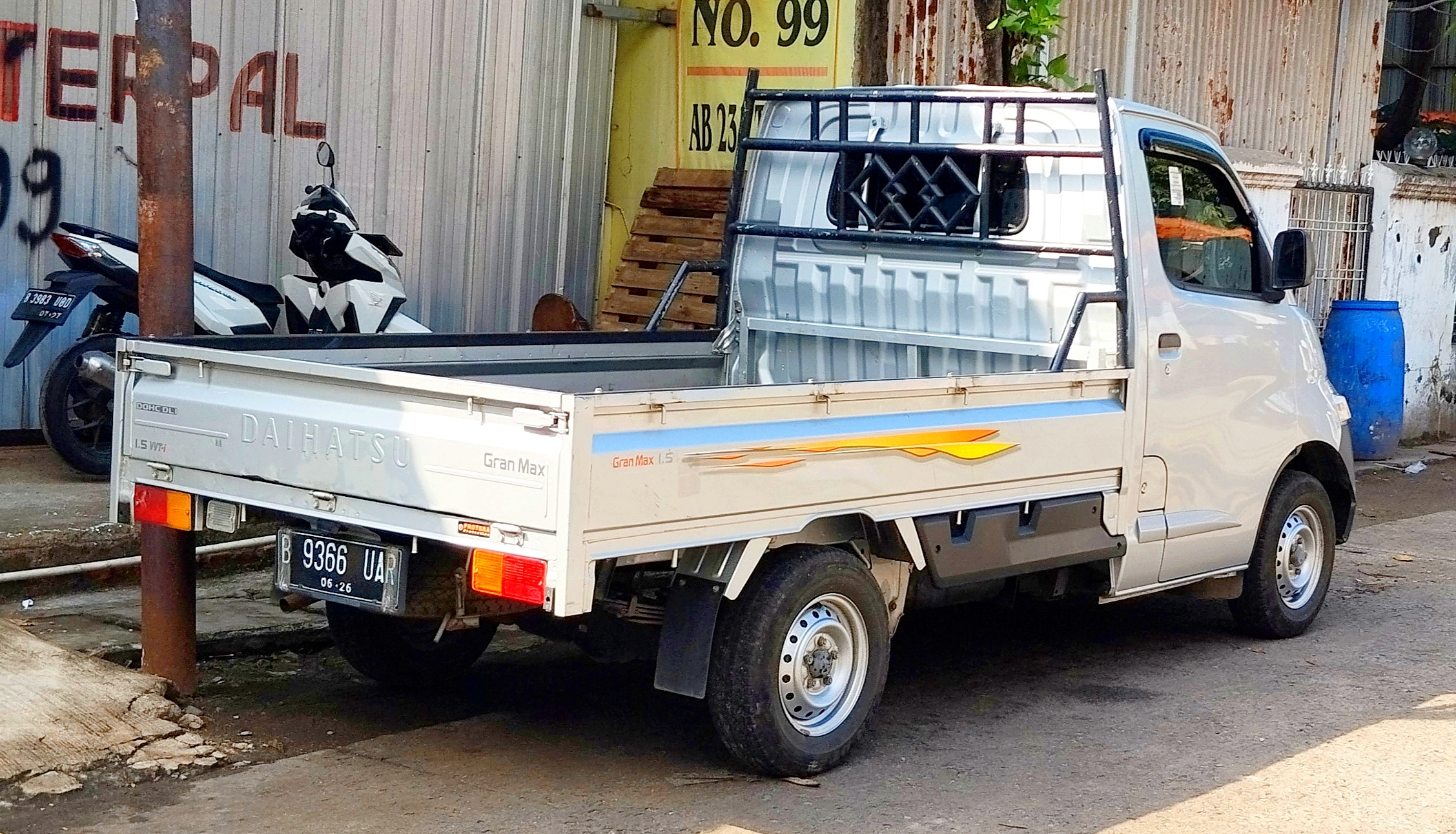
2021 Gran Max 1.5 DLi (S401RP; pre-facelift, Indonesia)

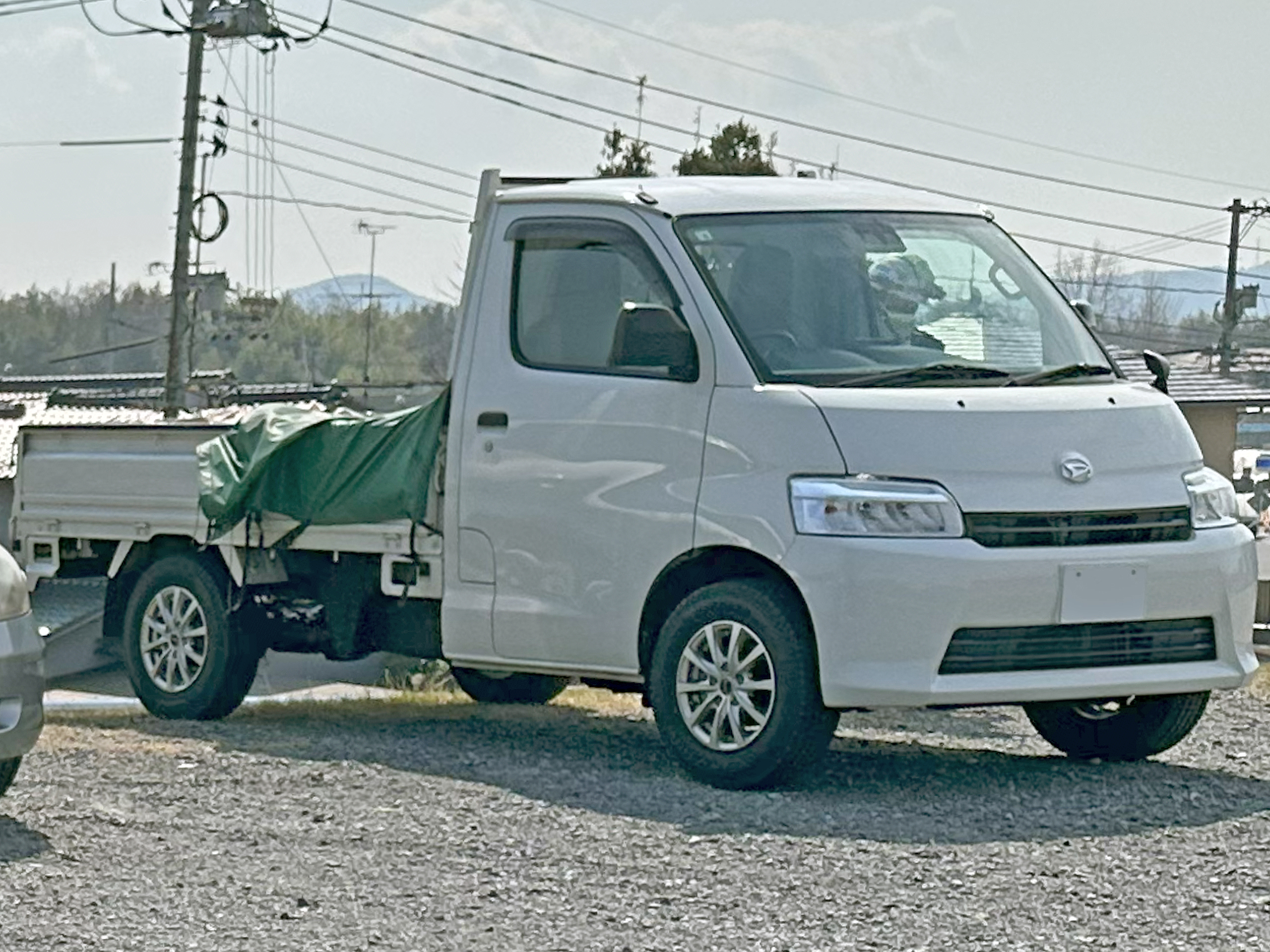
Gran Max Truck (S403U; facelift, Japan)

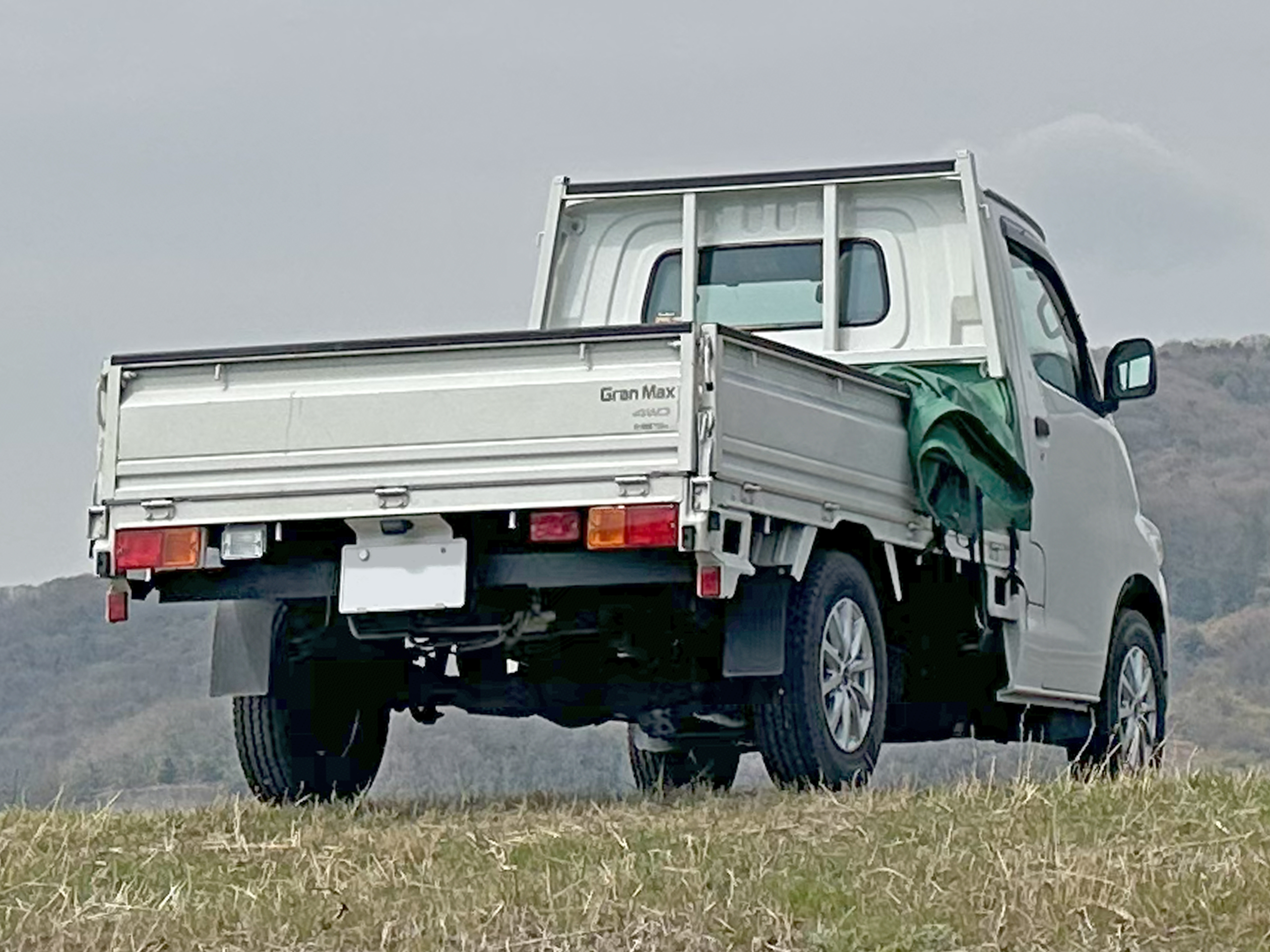
Gran Max Truck (S403U; facelift, Japan)

LiteAce/TownAce

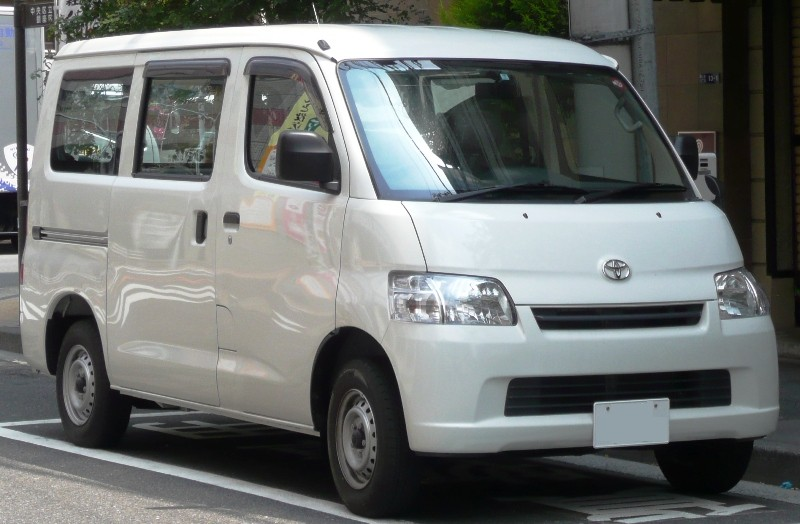
Toyota LiteAce Van GL (S402M, Japan)

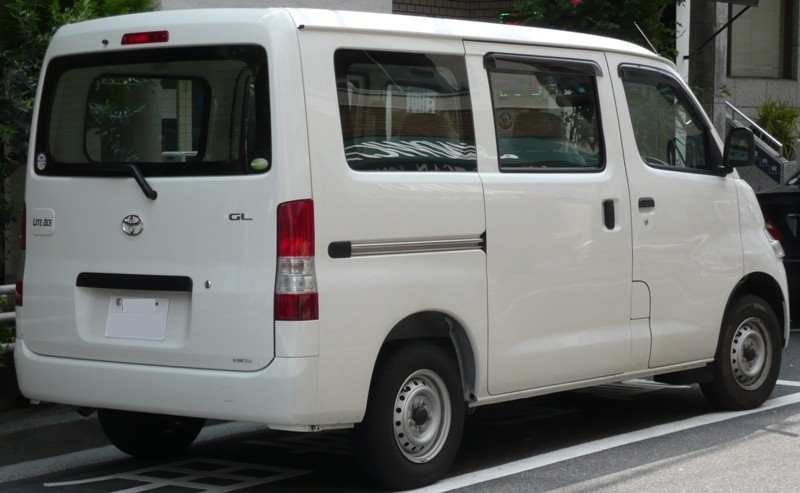
LiteAce Van GL (S402M, Japan)

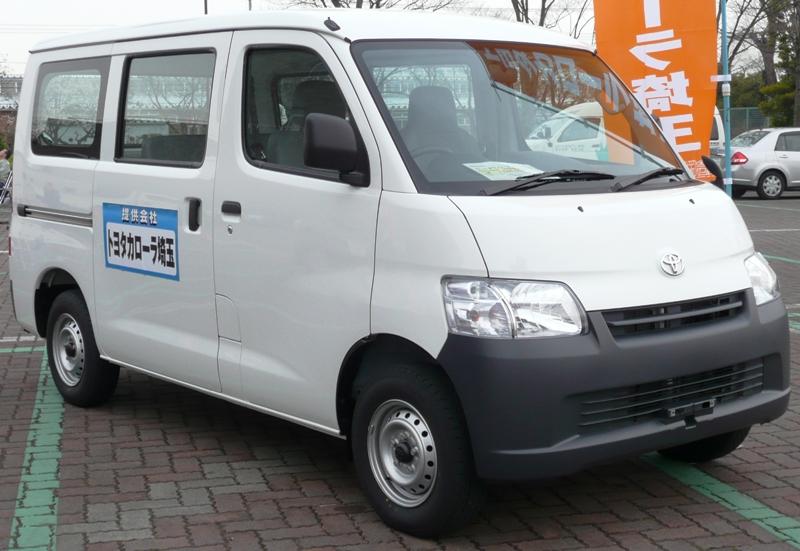
Toyota TownAce Van DX (S402M; pre-facelift, Japan)

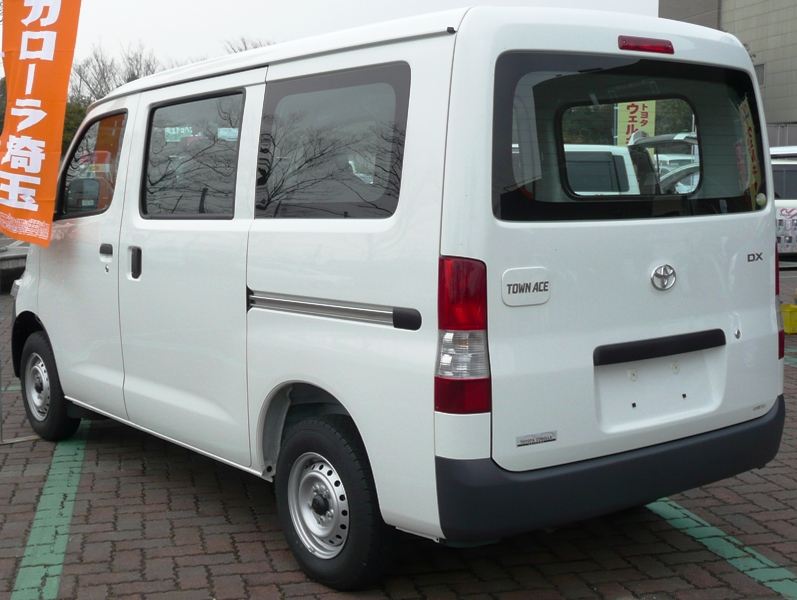
TownAce Van DX (S402M; pre-facelift, Japan)

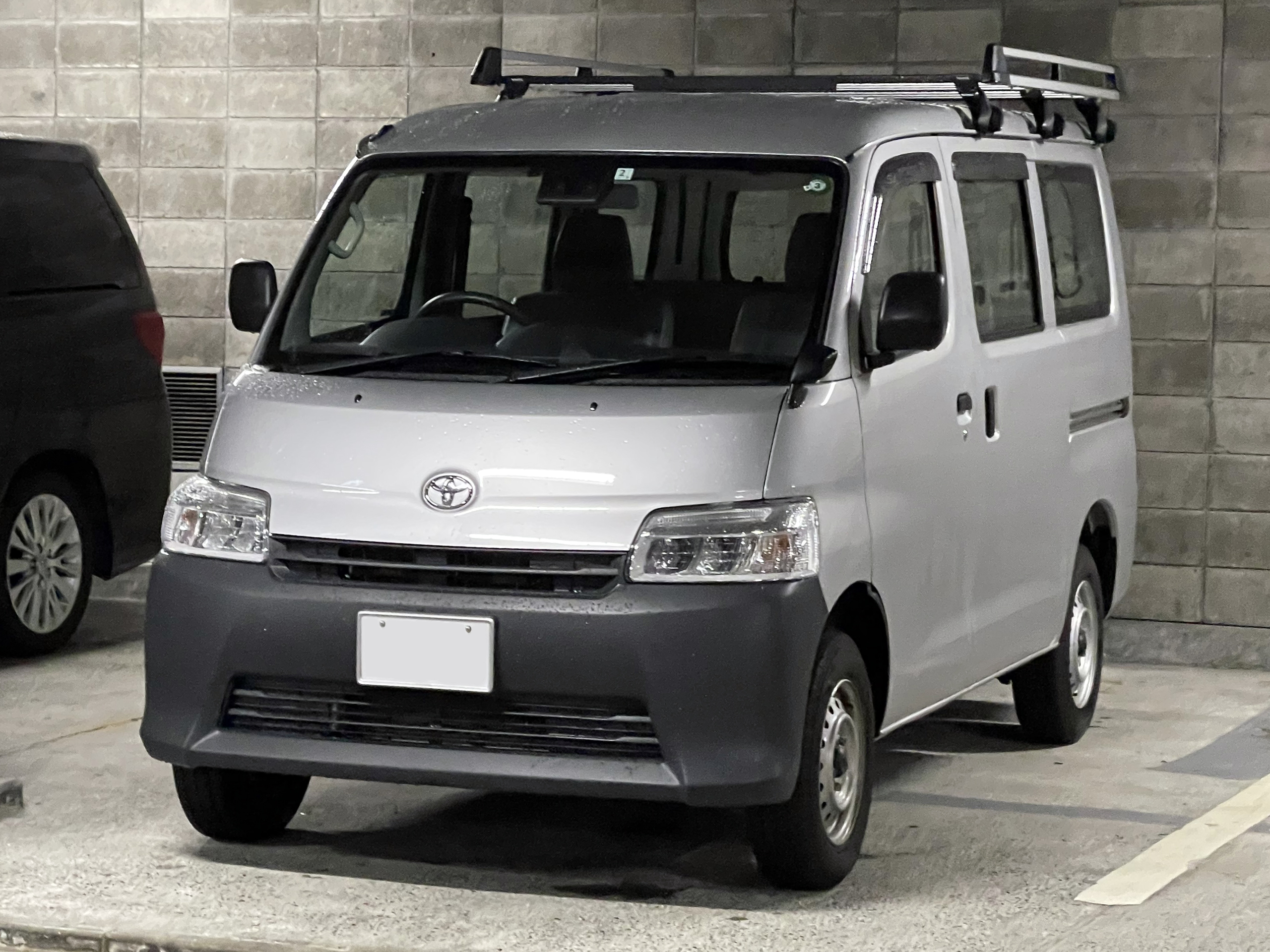
TownAce Van DX (S403M; facelift, Japan)

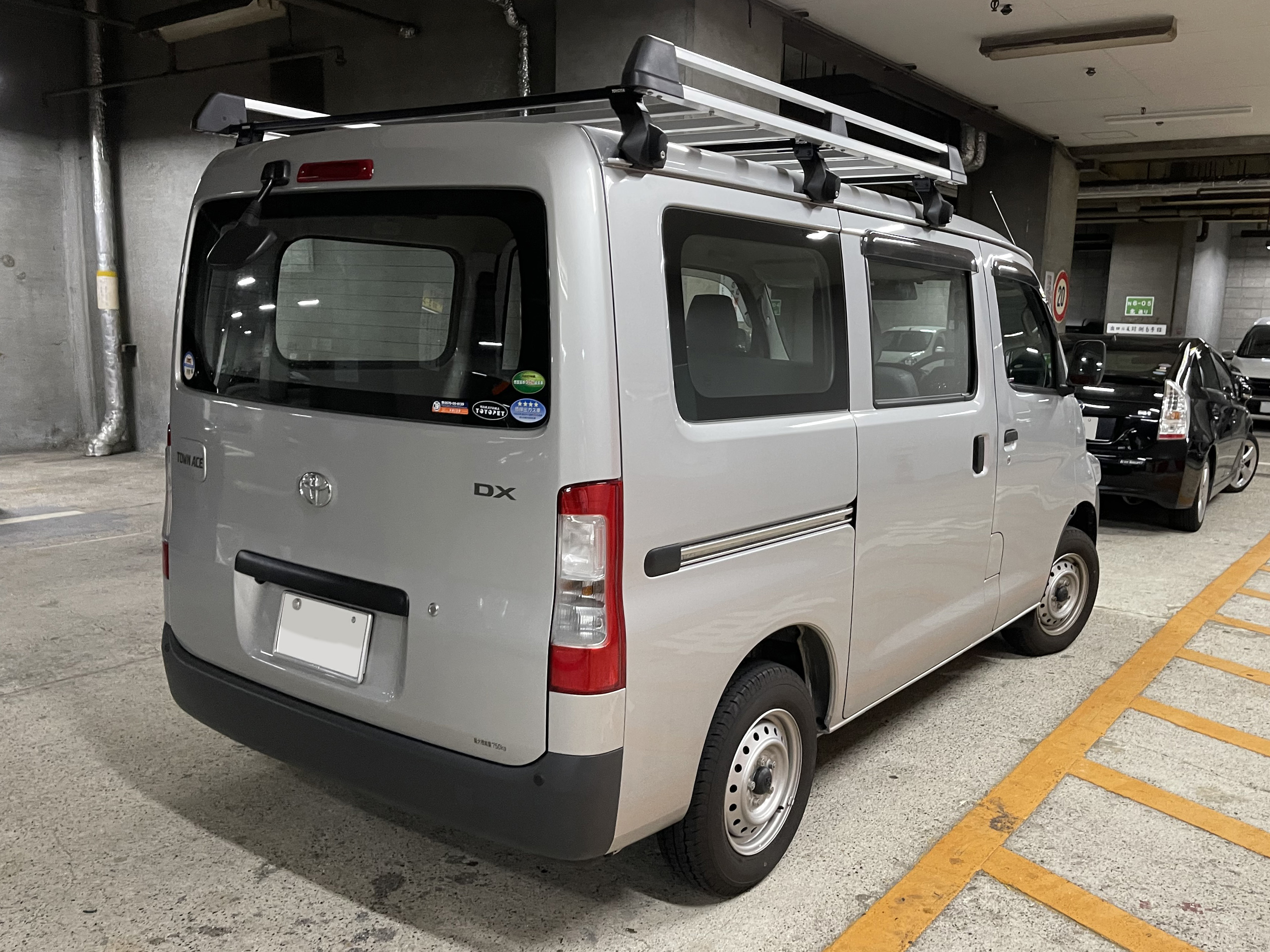
TownAce Van DX (S403M; facelift, Japan)

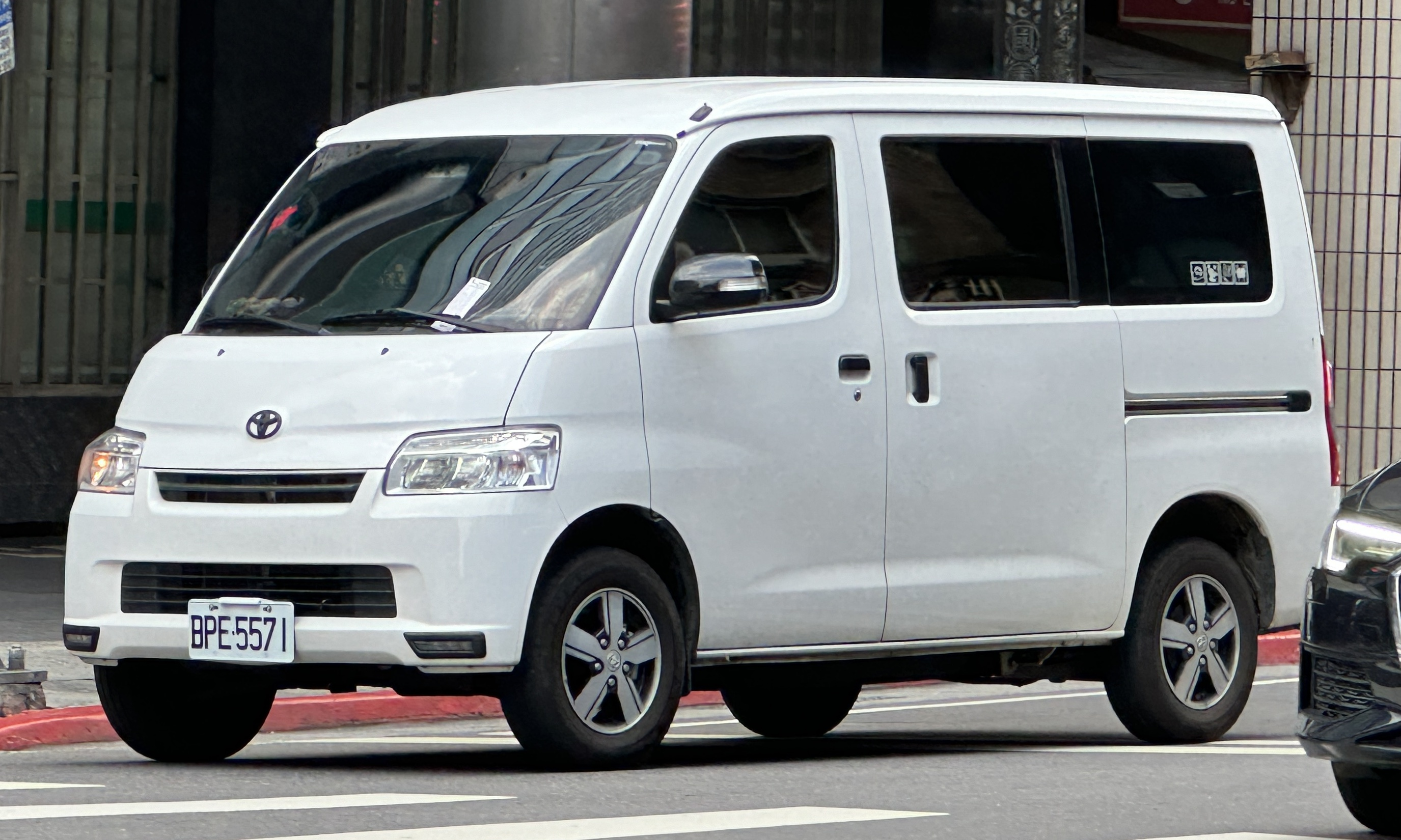
Toyota TownAce van (Taiwan)

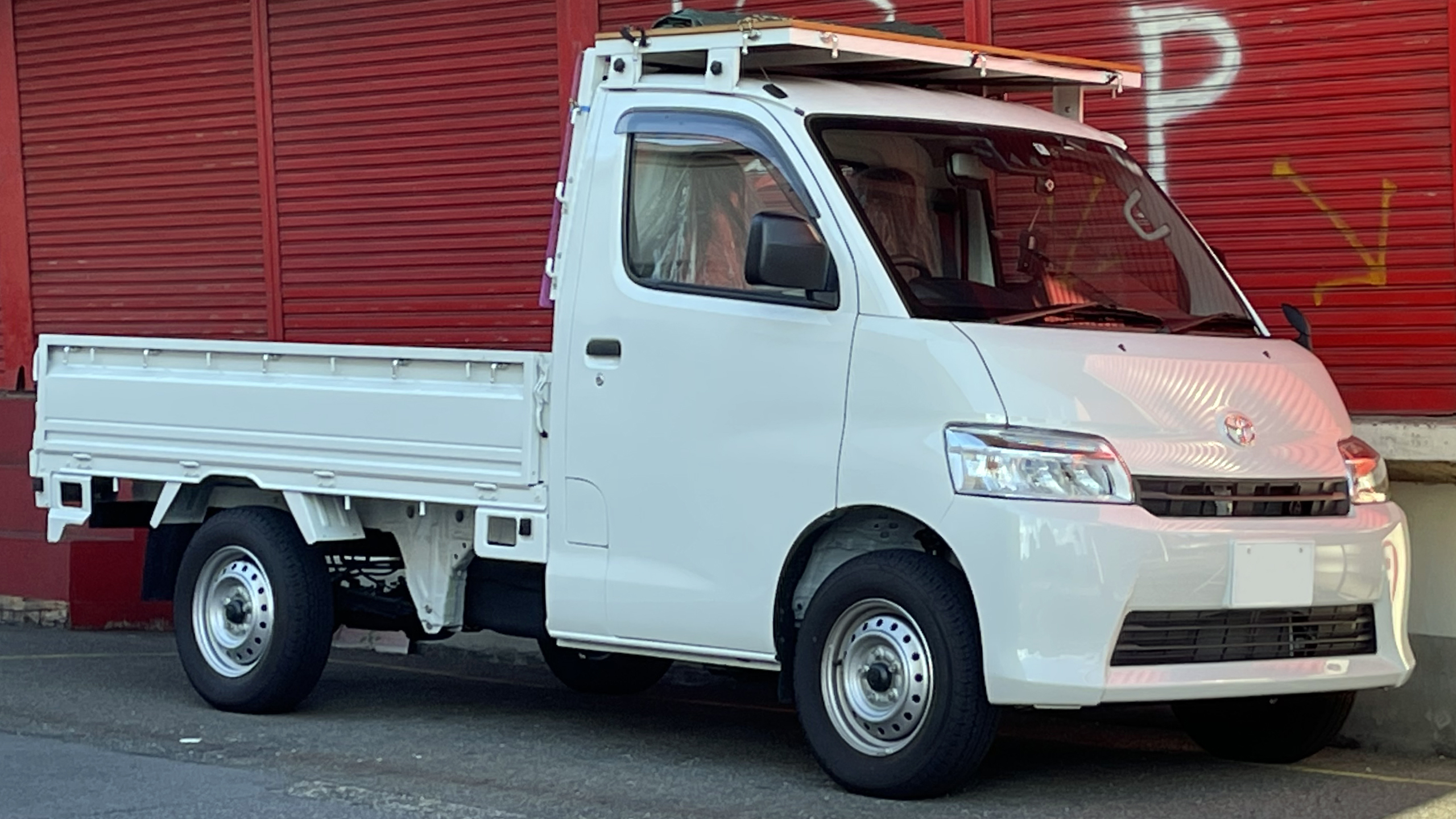
TownAce Truck DX (S403U; facelift, Japan)

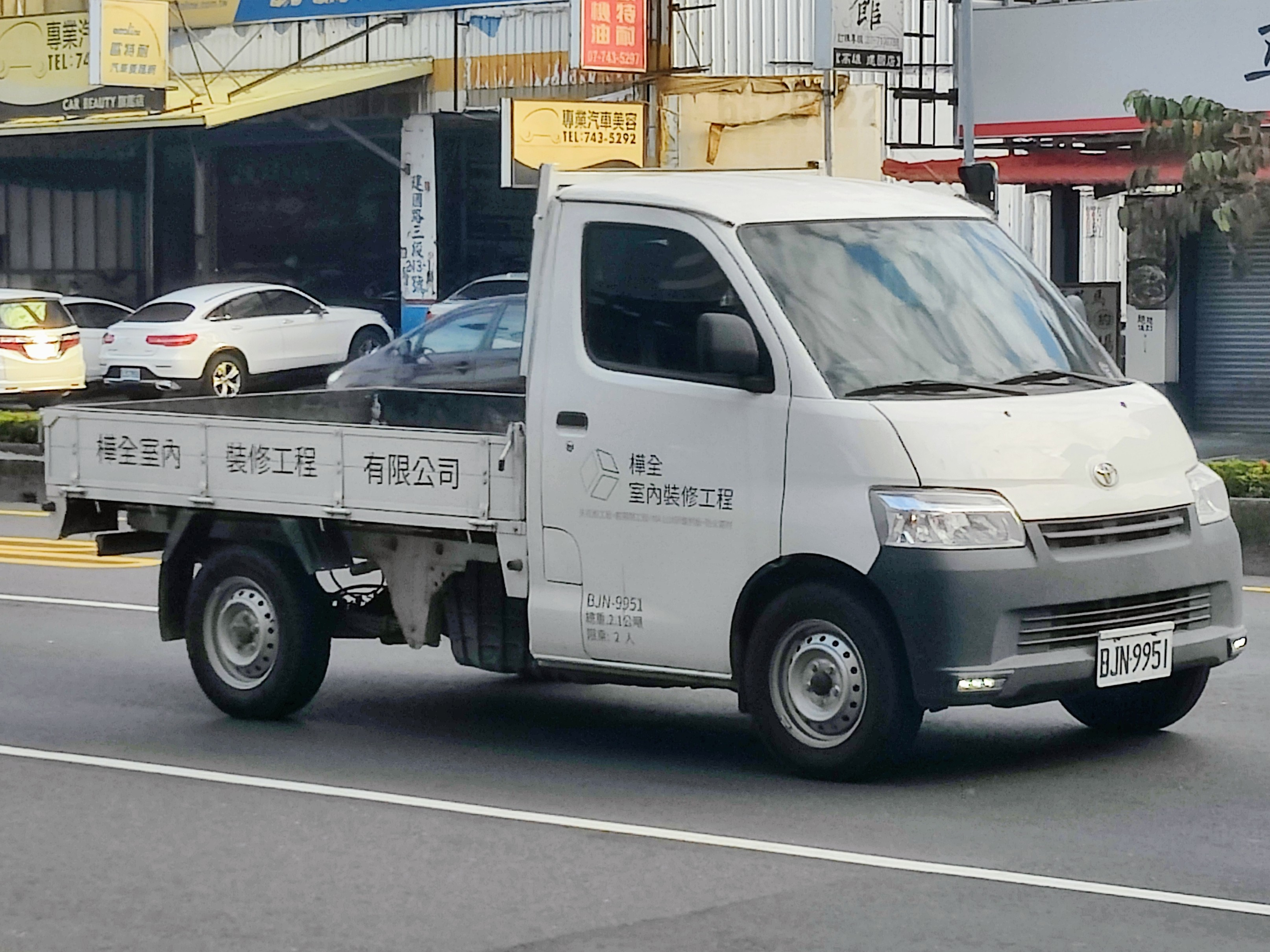
Toyota TownAce pickup (Taiwan)

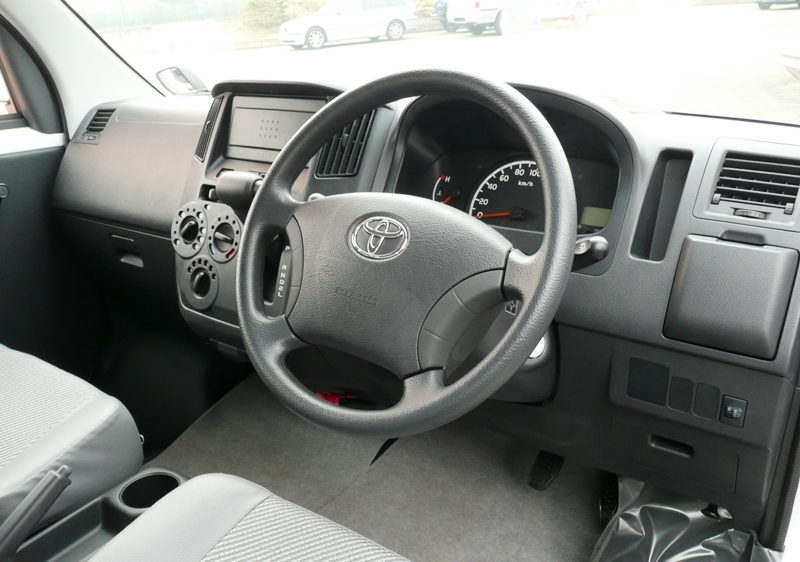
TownAce interior (pre-facelift)

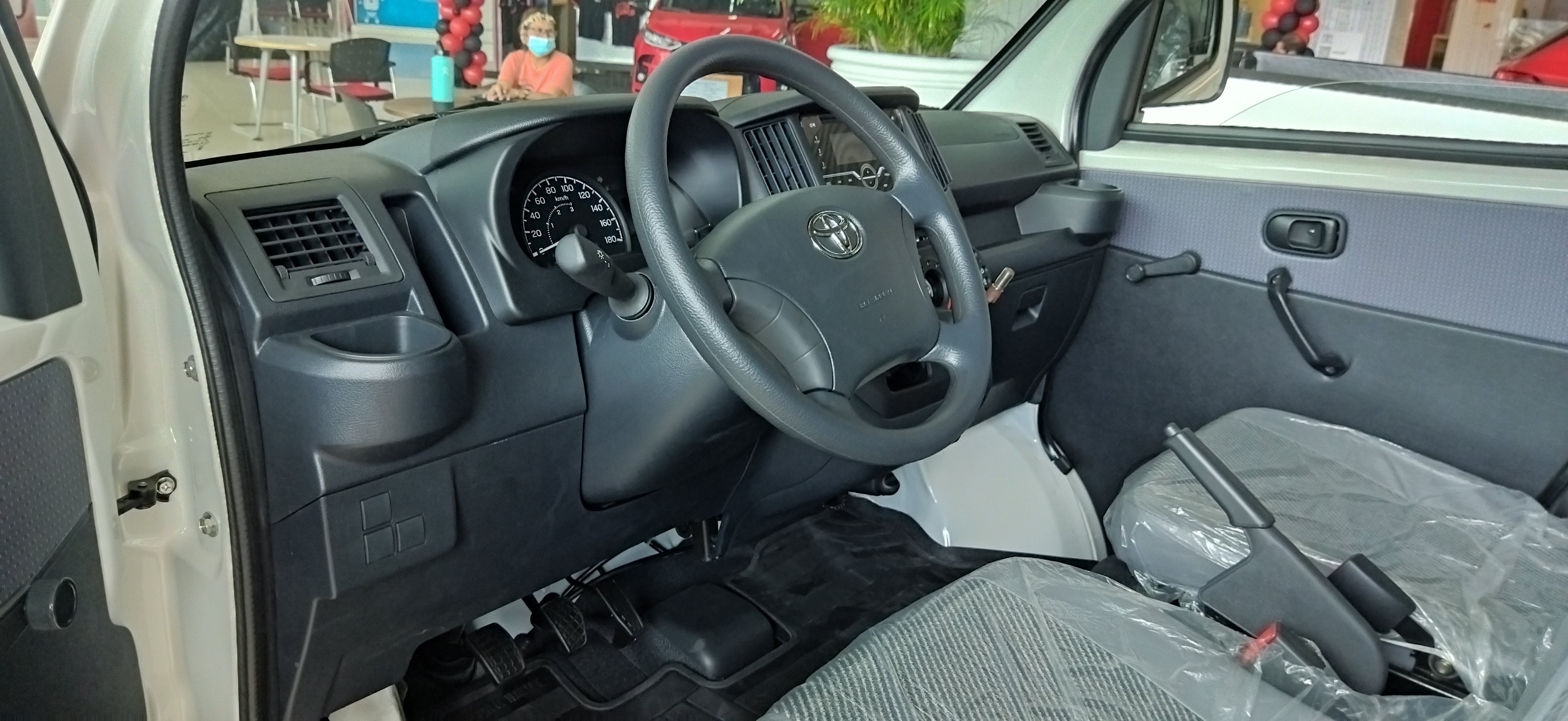
LiteAce interior (facelift)

Bongo

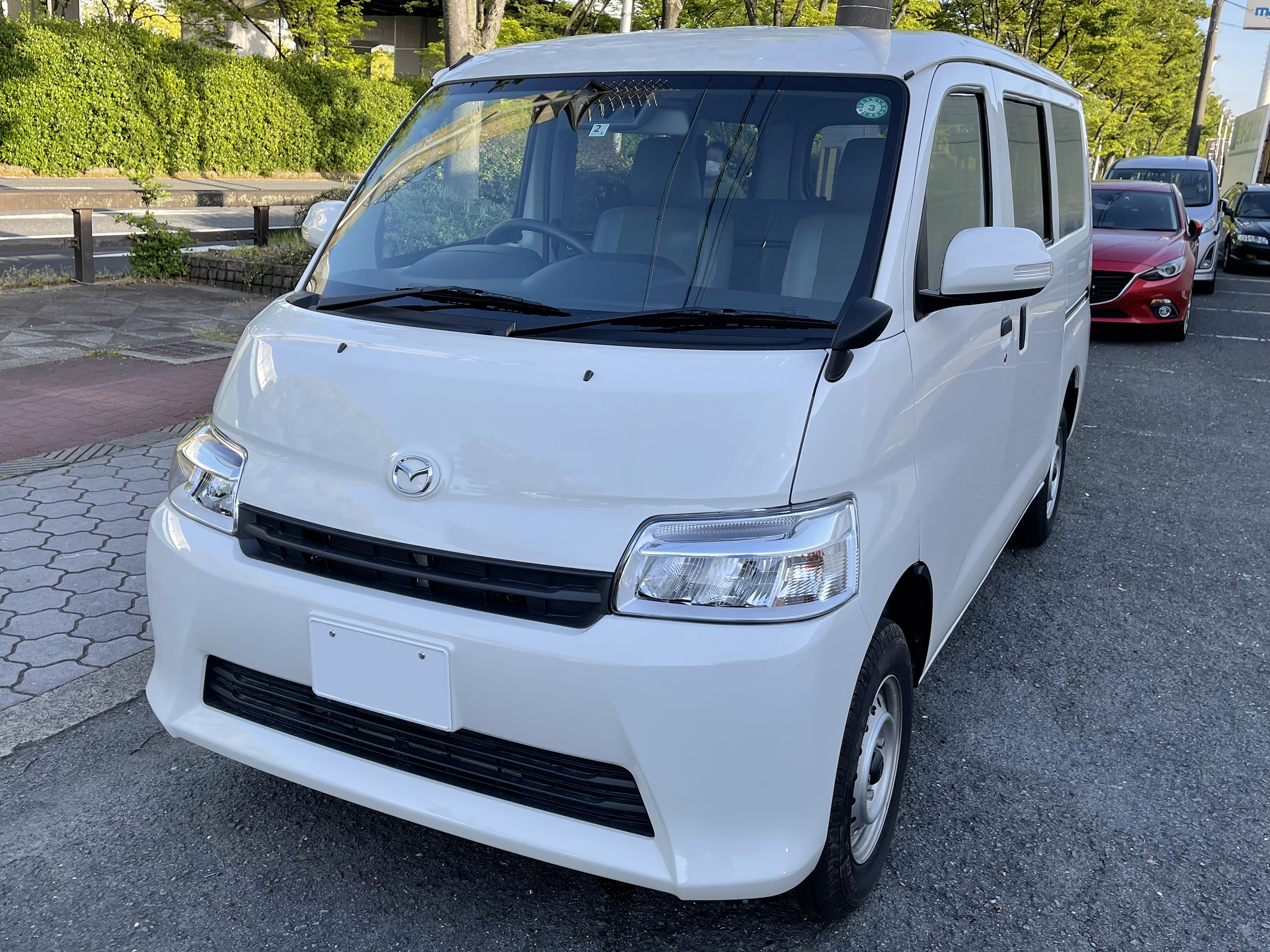
Mazda Bongo Van DX (S403Z, Japan)

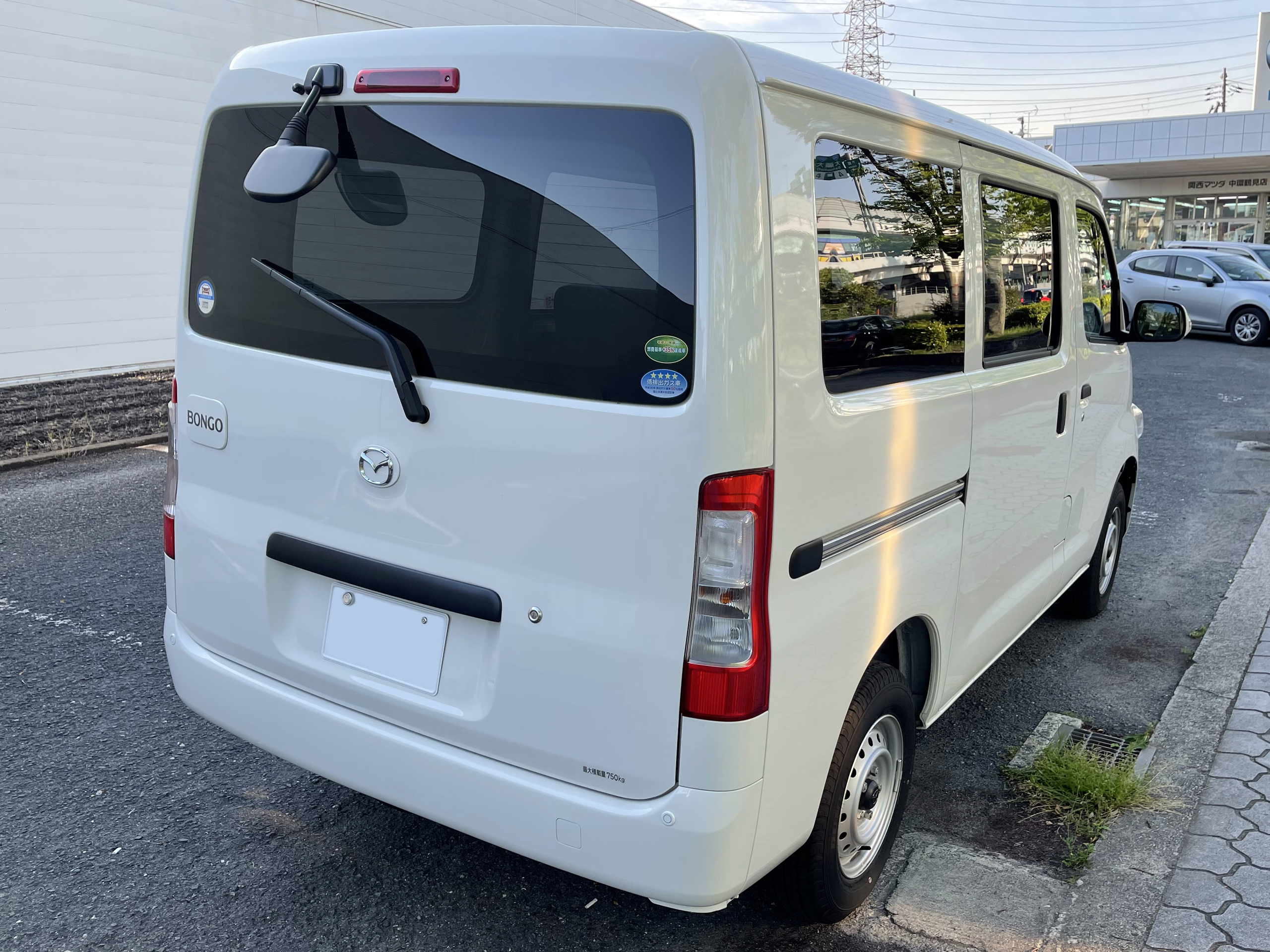
Bongo Van DX (S403Z, Japan)

== Sales ==
Year	Indonesia		
Year	Minibus	Blind Van	Pickup
2007	879	17	411
2008	11,980	1,169	14,183
2009	4,181	1,701	9,499
2010	7,197	2,780	19,401
2011	7,041	3,883	29,840
2012	8,995	5,649	37,948
2013	9,787	5,891	48,012
2014	7,832	6,293	57,151
2015	8,651	6,920	59,512
2016	6,760	6,714	37,996
2017	7,950	6,579	41,703
2018	7,562	8,627	42,389
2019	6,529	9,917	35,926
2020	3,391	5,240	23,742
2021	5,148	8,087	41,367
2022	4,715	11,491	48,856
2023	4,402	7,496	43,197
2024	4,511	9,183	42,122
2025	3,938	14,274	40,761
