= Desaxe =

Type of internal combustion engine

A desaxe engine, is one in which each cylinder is positioned with its exact center (the bore axis) slightly offset from the center line of the crankshaft. "Désaxé", in French, means "misaligned". Desaxe engines are usually automotive, but the term can also apply to steam engines.

An animation of a Scuderi Split Cycle Engine.

If the offset is in the direction of rotation, it has the effect of increasing the leverage applied to the crankshaft during the "power" stroke, and reducing thrust wasted against the cylinder wall.

In a conventional four-stroke engine, each of the strokes (intake, compression, power, exhaust) involves a nominal rotation of 180°, totaling 720° for the complete 4-stroke combustion cycle. A desaxe engine adds to the duration of the two downward strokes (intake and power), and subtracts the same amount from the two upward strokes (compression and exhaust), with the total remaining 720°. A typical desaxe engine will have strokes of 185° - 175° - 185° - 175°, etc., with the difference approximately, but not exactly, proportional to the percentage of offset distance to stroke length.

The relative proportion of offset distance versus stroke length ranges from very small to almost 20%; viz. an engine with an 80 mm stroke may have a cylinder offset of 20 mm.

Early adopters of the desaxe principle include Henry Ford who fully implemented the desaxe offset into the Ford Flathead V8 engine throughout the 1930s, and adopted greater offsets into the 1940s.

Use of desaxe engines is now becoming more common.. The Volkswagen VR6 & VR5 engines have desaxe cylinders with an offset of 12.5 mm. The front bank cylinders are offset forward of the crank, while the rear are offset rearward. The Toyota Prius has desaxe cylinder bores offset by 13 mm. The MT-09 motorcycle is the first Yamaha with desaxe pistons. Ford has a series of engines called Dragon series that have an offset crank shaft. The Honda K-series K20C1 engine from the 9th, 10th, and 11th generation Civic Type R also has an offset.

All single crank split-single engines such as those used by DKW and Puch had, by necessity, highly desaxe cylinders.

The Scuderi engine, as shown in the animated illustration, has highly desaxe cylinders. The compressor (blue) is offset a greater amount than the power cylinder (yellow). Its benefit is to give a better line of thrust from piston to crank though con-rod during downward power stroke, but it has disadvantages in vibration and bore wall thrust.
