= Toyota Avanza =

MPV produced by Toyota

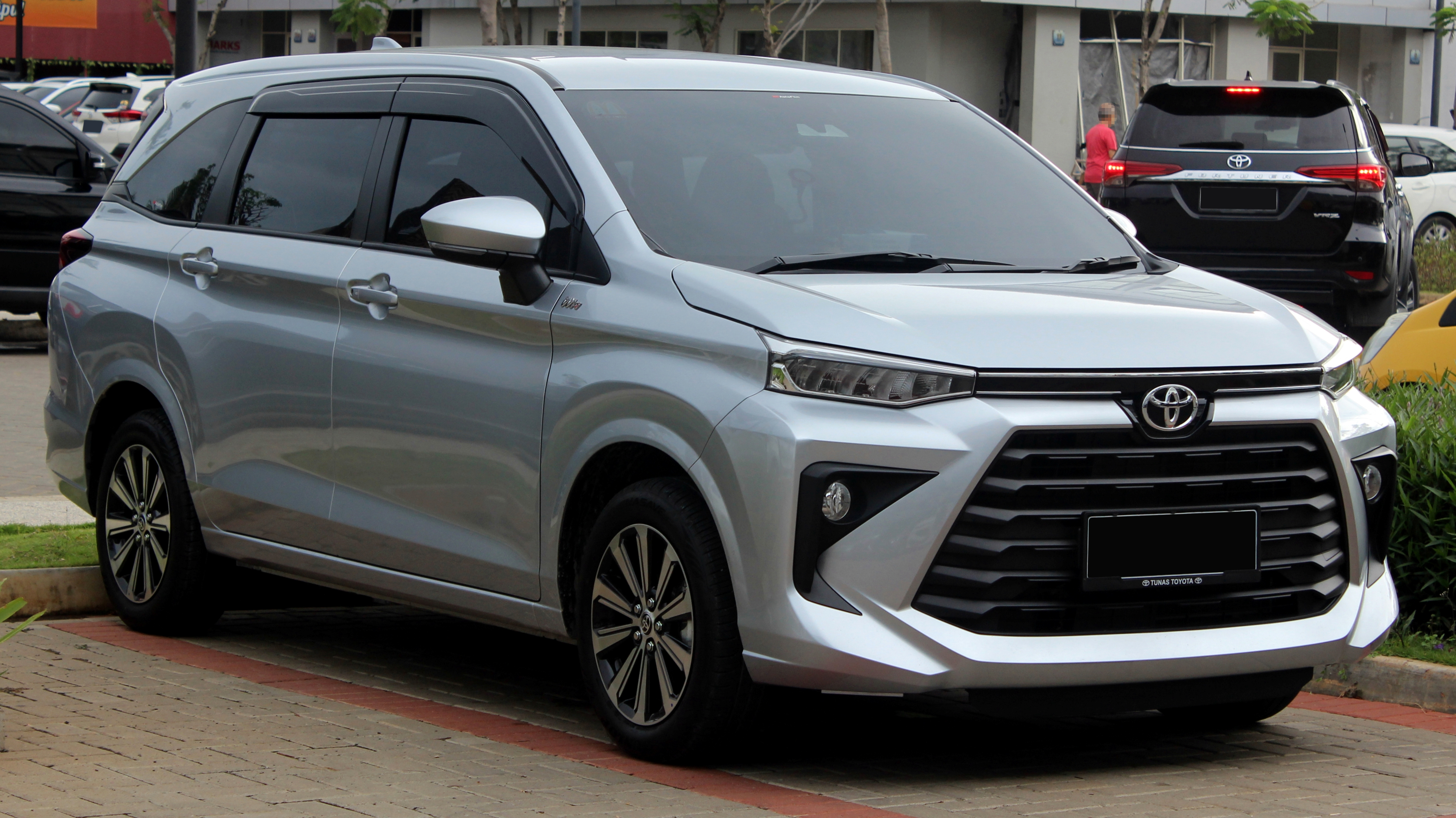
- 2022 Toyota Avanza 1.5 G TSS (W101RE, Indonesia)

Overview
- Manufacturer: Toyota; Daihatsu
- Also called: Daihatsu Xenia; Toyota Transmover (2016–present); Toyota Veloz (2021–present); Perodua Alza (2022–present)
- Production: December 2003 – present

Body and chassis
- Class: Mini MPV (2003–2023); Compact MPV (2021–present)
- Body style: 5-door wagon; 5-door van
- Layout: Front-engine, rear-wheel-drive (2003–2023); Front-engine, front-wheel-drive (2021–present)

Chronology
- Predecessor: Toyota Kijang (F70)

The Toyota Avanza and Daihatsu Xenia are a series of multi-purpose vehicles (MPV) developed by Daihatsu and marketed by both Toyota and Daihatsu, mainly sold with three-row seating. The Avanza and Xenia were developed as an entry-level MPV marketed mainly for the Indonesian and other emerging markets, and mainly produced in Indonesia by Astra Daihatsu Motor. Avanza's spiritual predecessor was the Kijang, whose model program has since been split into two different models (the other being the larger Kijang Innova) to expand Toyota's reach in the MPV sector.

In addition to Indonesia, the Avanza is sold throughout Southeast Asia, Mexico, Pakistan, Nepal, Bangladesh, Sri Lanka, the Middle East, Caribbean, Egypt, South Africa and other various African countries. A rebadged version of the car was sold in China under the FAW badge until 2016.

In 2021, the Avanza spawned another twin model called the Toyota Veloz, which the "Veloz" name was previously used for Avanza's flagship grade level for some markets between 2011 and 2021. The Avanza also served as a basis for the second-generation Perodua Alza, which was introduced in Malaysia in 2022.

The Avanza was the best-selling passenger car in Indonesia between 2006 and 2019, and then in 2021. At the peak of its popularity in 2013, the Avanza made up 17 percent of total car sales in Indonesia (22 percent combined with the Xenia). By November 2018, around 2.75 million units of Avanza/Xenia had been sold globally.

== Etymology ==
The name Avanza is derived from the Spanish word avanza which means 'get moving' and the Italian word avanzato, which means 'advance'. The name Xenia is derived from the Greek term Xenia, a concept of hospitality. The name Veloz is taken from the Spanish word veloz, meaning 'fast'.

== Development ==
The Avanza and Xenia were both conceived by Toyota, Daihatsu and its Indonesian subsidiaries in the wake of the 1997 Asian financial crisis. At the time, the price of the best-selling Kijang had skyrocketed, while the economy in the country had just recovered from the crisis. Feasibility studies started in 1999 when Toyota-Astra Motor proposed for a more affordable vehicle under the Kijang for the Indonesian market. Toyota Motor Corporation handed the development and manufacturing of the vehicle to Astra Daihatsu Motor due to Daihatsu's expertise on low-cost vehicles in Indonesia. Toyota and Daihatsu invested a total of US$90,000,000 for the project.

The project was also referred by Toyota as the U-IMV (Under-IMV) project, a reference to the Innova that sits in a segment above the Avanza which rides on the IMV platform. Unlike the Kijang and the succeeding Kijang Innova that both utilised full body-on-frame chassis, the first two generations of Avanza/Xenia used a semi-unibody chassis where the front half of the chassis used body-on-frame construction, while the rear half used monocoque construction. This hybrid-type chassis made it possible for the vehicle to retain the rear-wheel-drive layout from the previous generations of Kijang along with its ability to handle heavier loads. According to journalists, it also came with several downsides such as unstable ride during high speeds and unrefined NVH levels.

The second-generation model retained the same platform as the original model and took 4 years of development. Toyota and Daihatsu invested Rp 900,000,000,000 for the project.

The third-generation model ditched the semi-unibody chassis with rear-wheel-drive layout in favour of the full unibody construction of the Daihatsu New Global Architecture with front-wheel-drive layout. According to Toyota and Daihatsu, the switch was made as the infrastructure quality had improved in Indonesia, along with efficiency, performance and comfort benefits of the front-wheel-drive layout.

The first-generation Avanza/Xenia was assembled at the first Indonesian Daihatsu plant in Sunter, Jakarta. Between 2008 and 2011, Toyota also manufactured the car in Karawang under contract to meet the high demand. The second-generation model is assembled at the same plant as the first-generation model and also at the second Daihatsu plant in Karawang, West Java, from April 2013 to an unspecified period. For the third-generation model, production in Indonesia is split between the Daihatsu plant in Sunter for the Avanza and Xenia, and at the Toyota plant in Karawang for the Avanza and Veloz. It was also contract assembled in Malaysia by Perodua for the first models to be sold by Toyota with the Avanza badging. Vietnamese assembly for the third-generation model is also carried out via CKD method. The Malaysian market Veloz is fully manufactured in the country since 2022, sharing the assembly line with the similar Perodua Alza.

== Engines ==
Petrol engines
Chassis code	Model	Engine	Transmission	Power	Torque	Applications
F600/F650	1.0	989 cc EJ-DE DOHC 12-valve EFI straight-three	5-speed manual	42 kW (57 PS; 56 hp) at 5,200 rpm	90 N⋅m (66 lb⋅ft) at 3,600 rpm	Xenia (2003–2006)
F600/F650	1.0	989 cc EJ-VE DOHC 12-valve EFI straight-three with VVT-i	5-speed manual	46 kW (63 PS; 62 hp) at 5,600 rpm	90 N⋅m (66 lb⋅ft) at 3,600 rpm	Xenia (2006–2016)
F601/F651	1.3	1,298 cc K3-DE DOHC 16-valve EFI straight-four	5-speed manual	63 kW (86 PS; 84 hp) at 6,000 rpm	116 N⋅m (86 lb⋅ft) at 3,200 rpm	Avanza/Xenia (2003–2006)
F601/F651	1.3	1,298 cc K3-VE DOHC 16-valve EFI straight-four with VVT-i	5-speed manual 4-speed automatic	65.5 kW (89 PS; 88 hp) at 6,000 rpm (2004–2006); 68 kW (92 PS; 91 hp) at 6,000 rpm (2006–2015)	119 N⋅m (88 lb⋅ft) at 3,200 rpm (2004–2006); 119 N⋅m (88 lb⋅ft) at 4,400 rpm (2006–2015)	Avanza (2004–2015); Xenia (2006–2015)
F653	1.3	1,329 cc 1NR-VE DOHC 16-valve EFI straight-four with Dual VVT-i	5-speed manual 4-speed automatic	71 kW (97 PS; 95 hp) at 6,000 rpm	120 N⋅m (89 lb⋅ft) at 4,200 rpm	Avanza/Xenia (2015–2021)
W100	1.3	1,329 cc 1NR-VE DOHC 16-valve EFI straight-four with Dual VVT-i	5-speed manual CVT with 7-speed manual mode	72 kW (98 PS; 97 hp) at 6,000 rpm	121 N⋅m (89 lb⋅ft) at 4,200 rpm	Avanza/Xenia (2021–present)
F602/F652	1.5	1,495 cc 3SZ-VE DOHC 16-valve EFI straight-four with VVT-i	5-speed manual 4-speed automatic	80 kW (109 PS; 107 hp) at 6,000 rpm (2006–2011); 76.5 kW (104 PS; 103 hp) at 6,000 rpm (2011–2015)	141 N⋅m (104 lb⋅ft) at 4,400 rpm (2006–2011); 136 N⋅m (100 lb⋅ft) at 4,400 rpm (2011–2015)	Avanza (2006–2015); Xenia (China, 2007–2010)
F654	1.5	1,496 cc 2NR-VE DOHC 16-valve EFI straight-four with Dual VVT-i	5-speed manual 4-speed automatic	76.5 kW (104 PS; 103 hp) at 6,000 rpm	136 N⋅m (100 lb⋅ft) at 4,200 rpm	Avanza (2015–2021); Xenia (2019–2021)
W101/W151	1.5	1,496 cc 2NR-VE DOHC 16-valve EFI straight-four with Dual VVT-i	5-speed manual CVT with 7-speed manual mode	78 kW (106 PS; 105 hp) at 6,000 rpm	137 N⋅m (101 lb⋅ft) at 4,200 rpm	Avanza/Veloz/Xenia (2021–present); Alza (2022–present)

== First generation (F600; 2003) ==
First generation
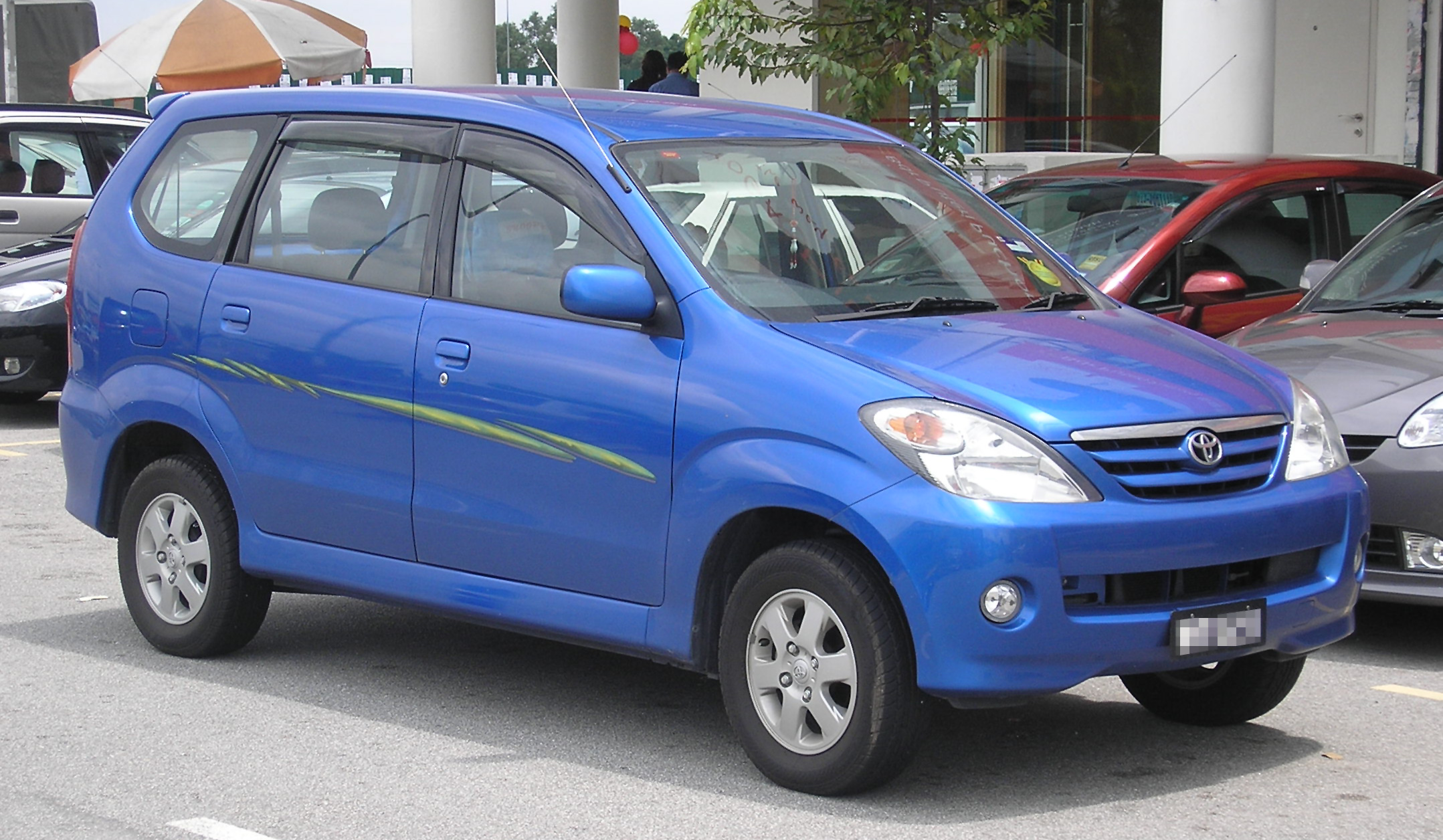
- Avanza 1.3 (F601M; pre-facelift, Malaysia)

Overview
- Model code: F600
- Also called: Daihatsu Xenia (Indonesia and China); FAW Senya M80/S80 (China); FAW Sirius S80 (South Africa and Pakistan); Pyeonghwa Ppeokkugi 1509 (North Korea)
- Production: December 2003 – September 2011 (Daihatsu/Toyota); 2007–2016 (FAW)
- Assembly: Indonesia: Sunter, North Jakarta (ADM); Karawang, West Java (TMMIN, 2008–2011); Malaysia: Rawang, Selangor (Perodua); China: Jilin (FAW Jilin)
- Designer: Kenta Shimoguchi (pre-facelift and facelift); Manabu Fukuda and Takuya Saiwaki (pre-facelift); Nobuhiro Hata, Shingo Sakai, and Shinichi Nakabayashi (facelift and Avanza S)

Body and chassis
- Class: Mini MPV
- Layout: Front-engine, rear-wheel-drive
- Related: Toyota Rush (F700); Daihatsu Taruna

Powertrain
- Engine: Petrol: 989 cc EJ-DE I3 (F600; Xenia only); 989 cc EJ-VE VVT-i I3 (F600; Xenia only); 1298 cc K3-DE I4 (F601); 1298 cc K3-VE VVT-i I4 (F601); 1495 cc 3SZ-VE I4 (F602)
- Power output: 42 kW (57 PS; 56 hp) (EJ-DE); 46 kW (63 PS; 62 hp) (EJ-VE); 63 kW (86 PS; 84 hp) (K3-DE); 65.5–68 kW (89–92 PS; 88–91 hp) (K3-VE); 80 kW (109 PS; 107 hp) (3SZ-VE)
- Transmission: 5-speed manual; 4-speed automatic

Dimensions
- Wheelbase: 2,655 mm (104.5 in)
- Length: 4,070–4,120 mm (160.2–162.2 in)
- Width: 1,630–1,640 mm (64.2–64.6 in)
- Height: 1,685–1,695 mm (66.3–66.7 in)
- Kerb weight: 980–1,095 kg (2,161–2,414 lb)

=== Markets ===
==== Indonesia ====
The Avanza was unveiled on 11 December 2003 and released on 15 January 2004. The car emerged from the first collaboration project between Toyota and Daihatsu in Indonesia with development led by Toyota chief engineer Kaoru Hosokawa, product planning leader of Toyota Commercial Vehicle Development Centre. It was manufactured at Astra Daihatsu Motor's Sunter assembly plant, with 61 percent of its parts were sourced locally.

While Toyota targeted a total sales of 30,000 for the year 2004, in January, a total of 25,000 bookings for the car had been received, leading to the increase of production capacity. It sold 43,936 units in that year, which made it the third best-selling car in Indonesia. The Avanza emerged as the best-selling car there from 2006, replacing the Kijang Innova which held the title in 2005.

At launch, the Avanza was initially available with two grade levels: the 1.3 E and 1.3 G, both powered with a 1.3-litre K3-DE four-cylinder engine mated to a 5-speed manual transmission. Starting from July 2004, the limited-production 1.3 S grade with a 4-speed automatic transmission was available to the Indonesian market. Similar to the export models, the 1.3-litre engine was upgraded to use variable valve timing (VVT-i) technology and individual direct ignition coils, while changing the designation to K3-VE. The variant also included the anti-lock braking system and extra sound dampening materials. For the first time, a black exterior colour option was also added at the same time.

In July 2006, it received its first facelift with a redesigned grille, bumper, beige interior colour and updated tail lights. The 1.3 E and 1.3 G grades were upgraded to use the K3-VE 1.3-litre VVT-i petrol engine, complied with Euro 2 standards. In October 2006, the flagship 1.5 S grade was introduced. It is powered by a 3SZ-VE 1.5-litre VVT-i petrol engine along with dedicated front bumper, rear bumper, side skirts and grille designs.

The Avanza received an update on 14 October 2008 with an updated ceiling with grooves to improve airflow, a revamped interior and steering wheel with four spokes. It received a front bumper mesh grille, added fog light garnish and a chrome accent in the rear window. Avanza 1.5 S grade also received rearview mirror turn signal with sharper styling. Avanza 1.5 S with automatic transmission received new gated automatic transmission from that year and shift lock button. On 17 November 2009, the 1.3 E and 1.3 G grades received a 4-speed automatic transmission option. Avanza 1.3 E and 1.3 G automatic transmission did not receive shift lock button until early 2011.

==== Malaysia ====
In Malaysia, the Avanza was unveiled on 7 October 2004 and launched on 29 October 2004. Sold through UMW Toyota distribution network, it was available with a 1.3-litre engine mated to either a manual or an automatic transmission. It was assembled by Perodua by importing CKD kits from Indonesia. In October 2006, the Avanza received its facelift in Malaysia. Two newer grades were offered: 1.3 E and 1.5 G. In 2008, the Avanza received another minor update with the introduction of 1.5 S grade.

In 2006, the Avanza makes up 40 percent of Toyota total sales in Malaysia and around 140,000 units were sold in the country by 2012.

==== Philippines ====
In the Philippines, the first-generation Avanza had been on sale since 2006. It was available in two grade levels: the J grade with a 1.3-litre engine, having no power windows and locks, and only available with a manual transmission, while the G grade has a 1.5-litre engine, and available with a five-speed manual transmission and a four-speed automatic transmission respectively. In 2008, the J grade was made available without the third row seat. This particular grade is popularly used as metered taxicabs in the Philippines. The Avanza was also updated in 2008 with an updated ceiling with grooves to improve airflow to the rear and an updated interior colour scheme.

==== Thailand ====
In Thailand, the first-generation Avanza had been on sale since mid-2004.

=== Gallery ===
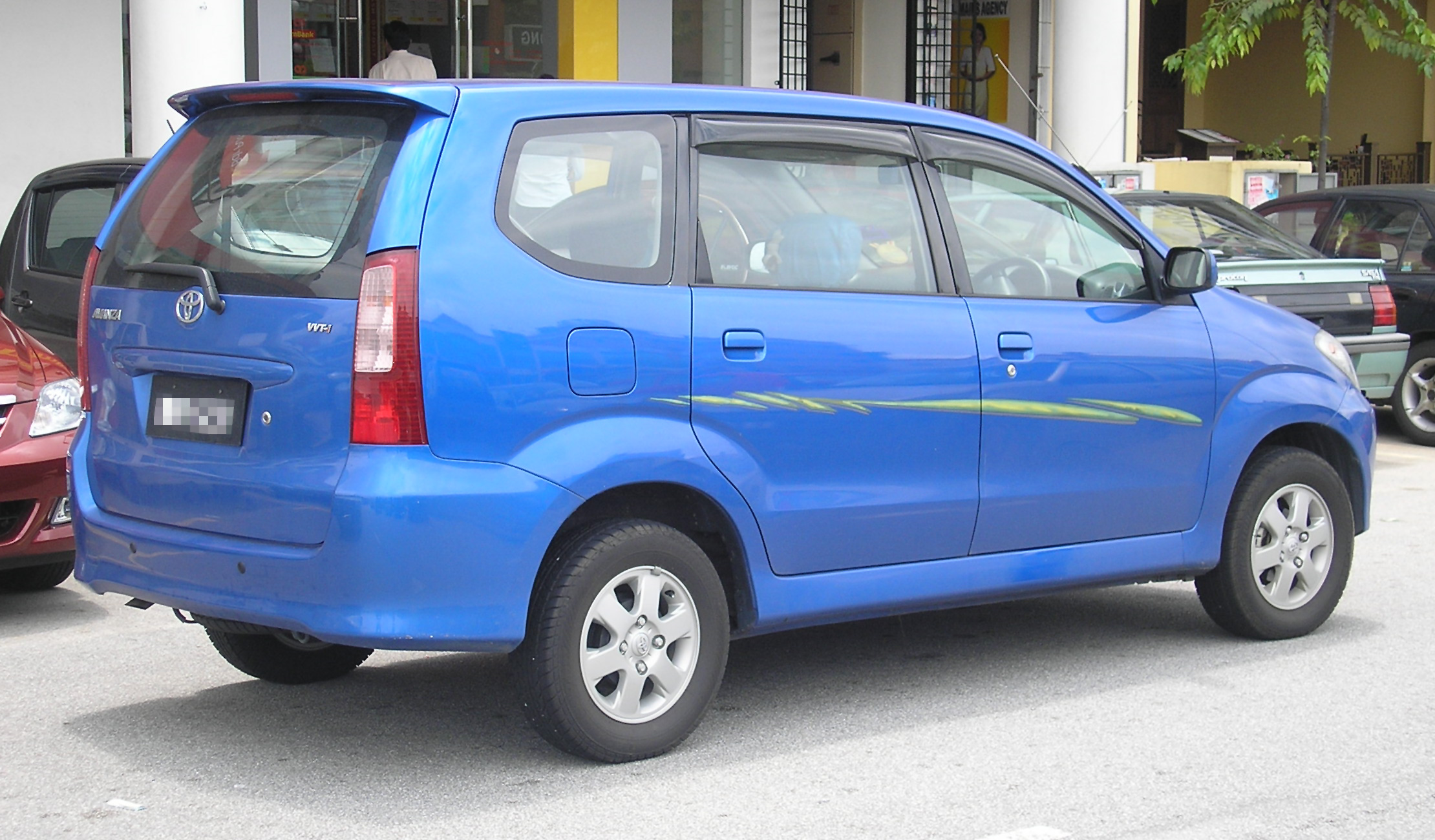
Avanza 1.3 (F601M; pre-facelift, Malaysia)

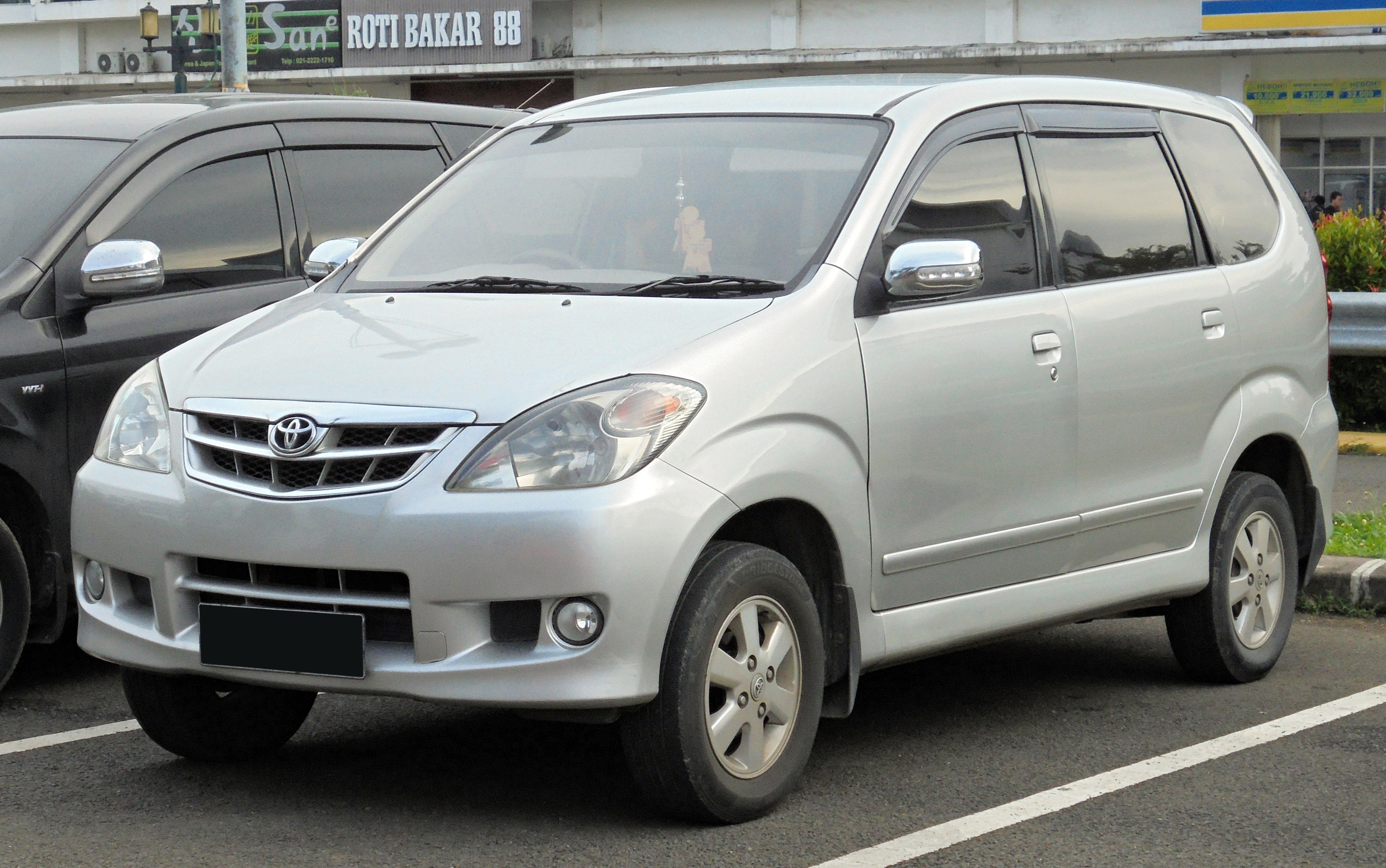
2007 Avanza 1.3 G (F601RM; facelift, Indonesia)

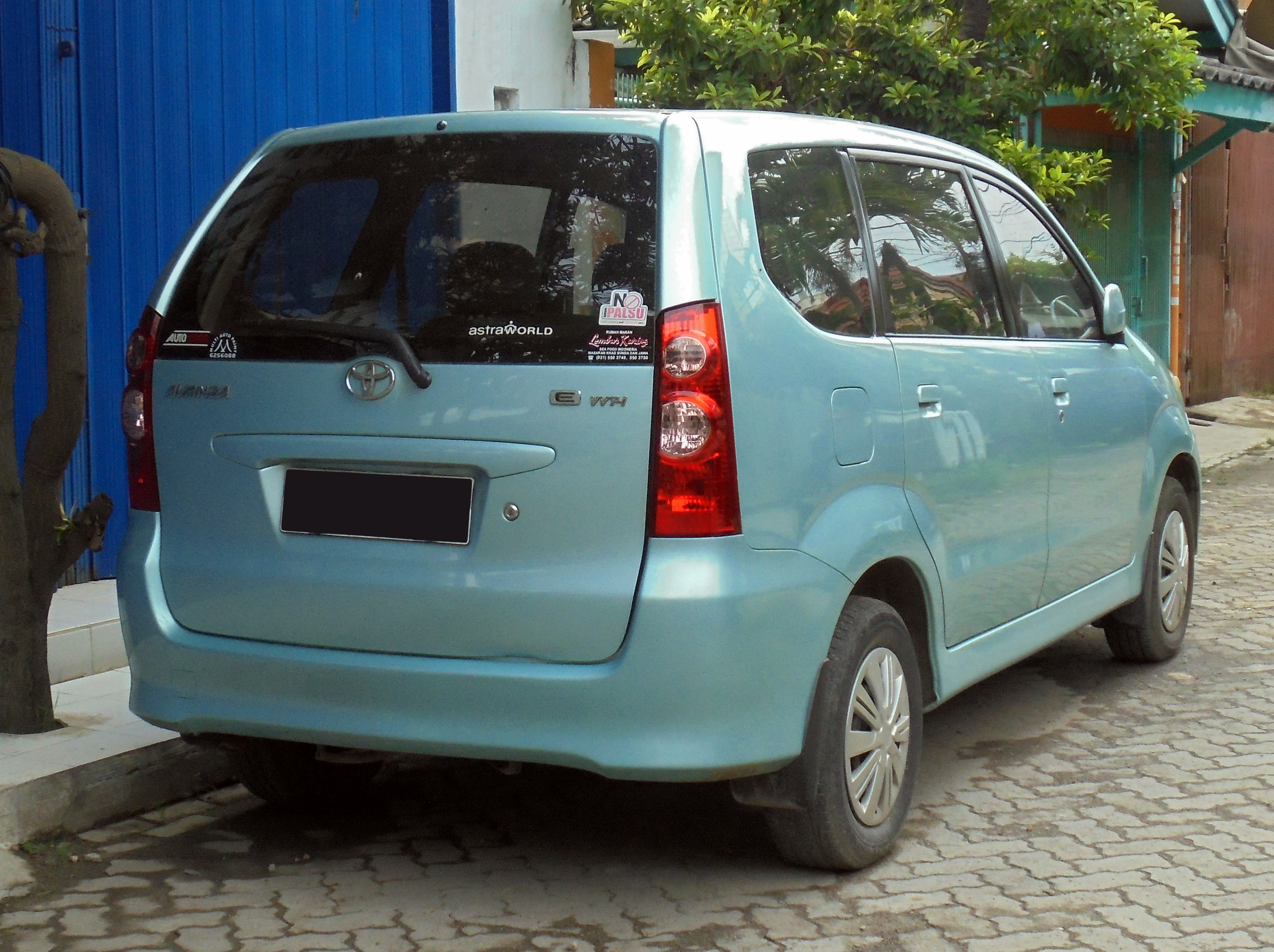
2007 Avanza 1.3 E (F601RM; facelift, Indonesia)

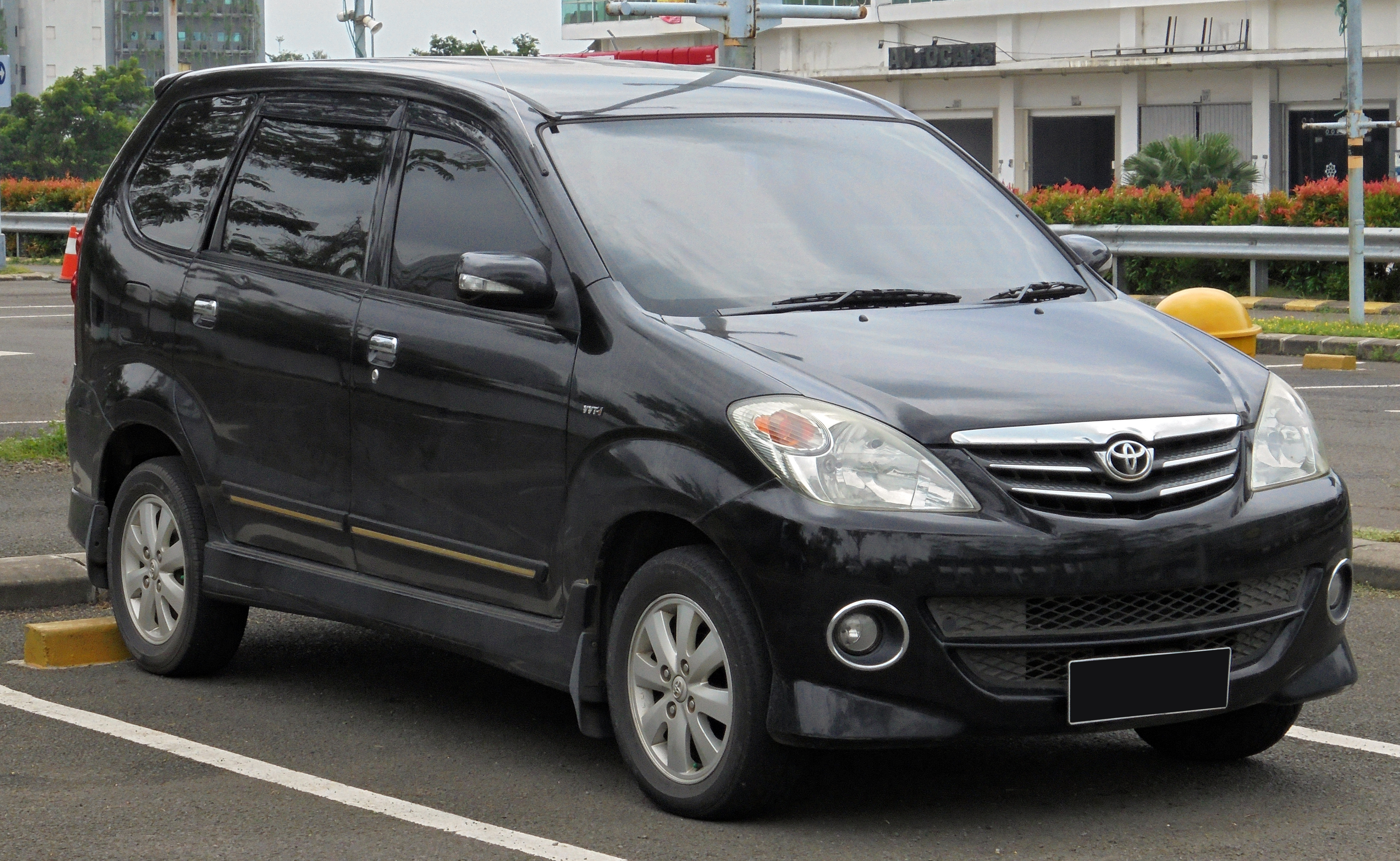
2011 Avanza 1.5 S (F602RM; facelift, Indonesia)

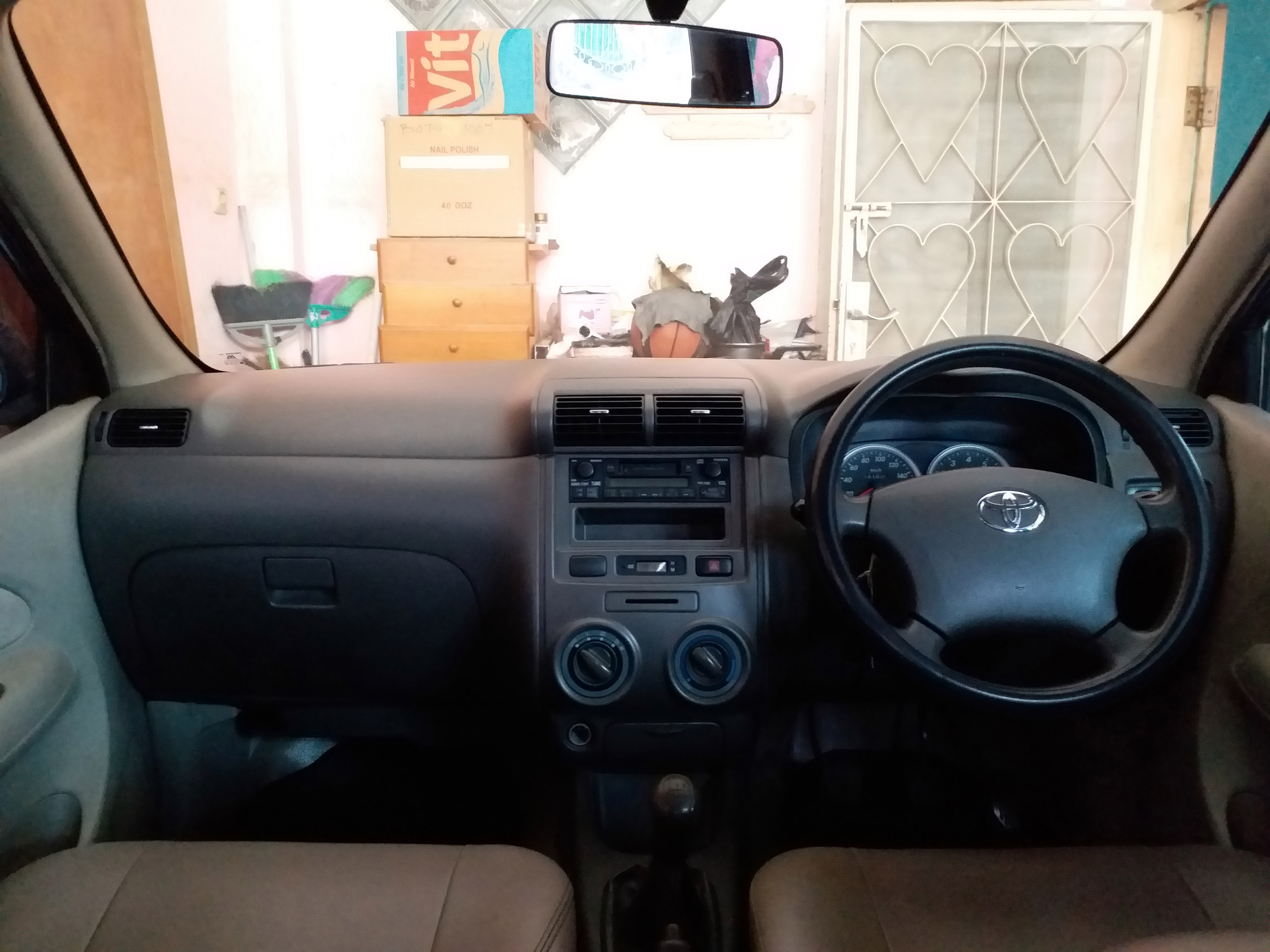
2009 Avanza 1.3 G interior (facelift, Indonesia)

=== Daihatsu Xenia ===
A twin model called Daihatsu Xenia also offered as a more affordable alternative to the Avanza in Indonesia. Generally, the Xenia is equipped with less safety equipment than the Avanza, while offering more dealer-installed accessories options such as front bumper guards, rear spoiler, or side body moulding to attract consumers. In Indonesia, the Xenia was available in three grade levels: 1.0 Mi, 1.0 Li and 1.3 Xi. Several accessories package was offered to the Li and Xi variants, including Plus, Deluxe, Family and Sporty. In November 2009, the automatic transmission option for the 1.3 Xi grade was launched.

It is powered by the same 1.3-litre engine found in the Avanza and additional 989 cc EJ-DE (before 2006) and EJ-VE three-cylinder engines with power and torque rating at 42–46 kW (57–63 PS; 56–62 hp) at 5,600 rpm and 90 N⋅m (67 lb⋅ft) at 3,600 rpm. To minimize the weight and the workload to the engine, the 1.0-litre variant was not available with double blower air conditioner and is fitted with 13-inch wheels. Throughout its production, the 1.0-litre Xenia was only offered with a 5-speed manual transmission.

Apart from Indonesia, the Xenia was also sold in China. It was previewed by the "D-01" crossover prototype at the Auto China in November 2006, and went on sale in June 2007. Seven-seat and five-seat models (with two rows of seats), either with a 1.3-litre or a 1.5-litre engine, were available. It was produced by FAW Jilin Auto and was also sold as the FAW Senya M80. It was discontinued January 2010 when Daihatsu pulled out from Chinese market and the joint venture for auto parts also dissolved in 2010. However, it continued to be produced and sold under license carrying the FAW marque.

==== Gallery ====
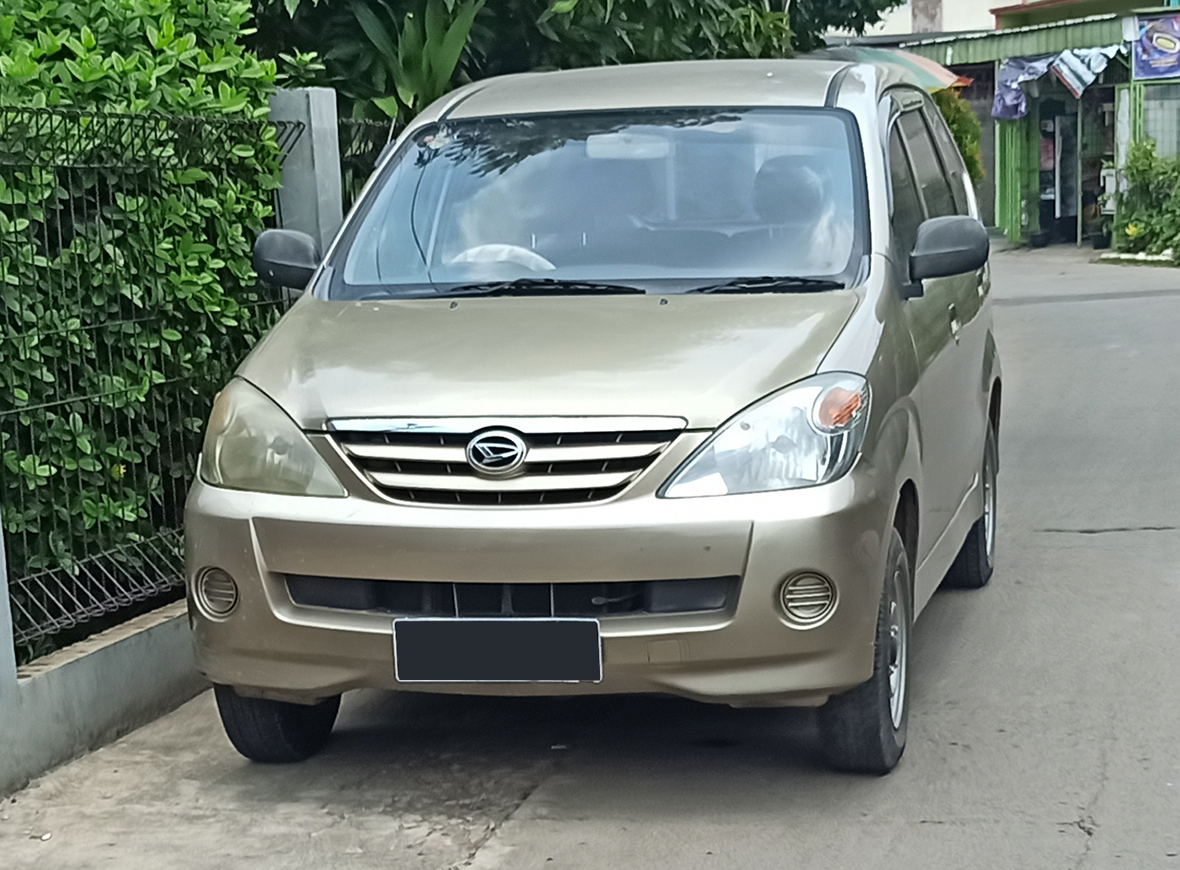
Daihatsu Xenia 1.0 Li (F600RV; pre-facelift, Indonesia)

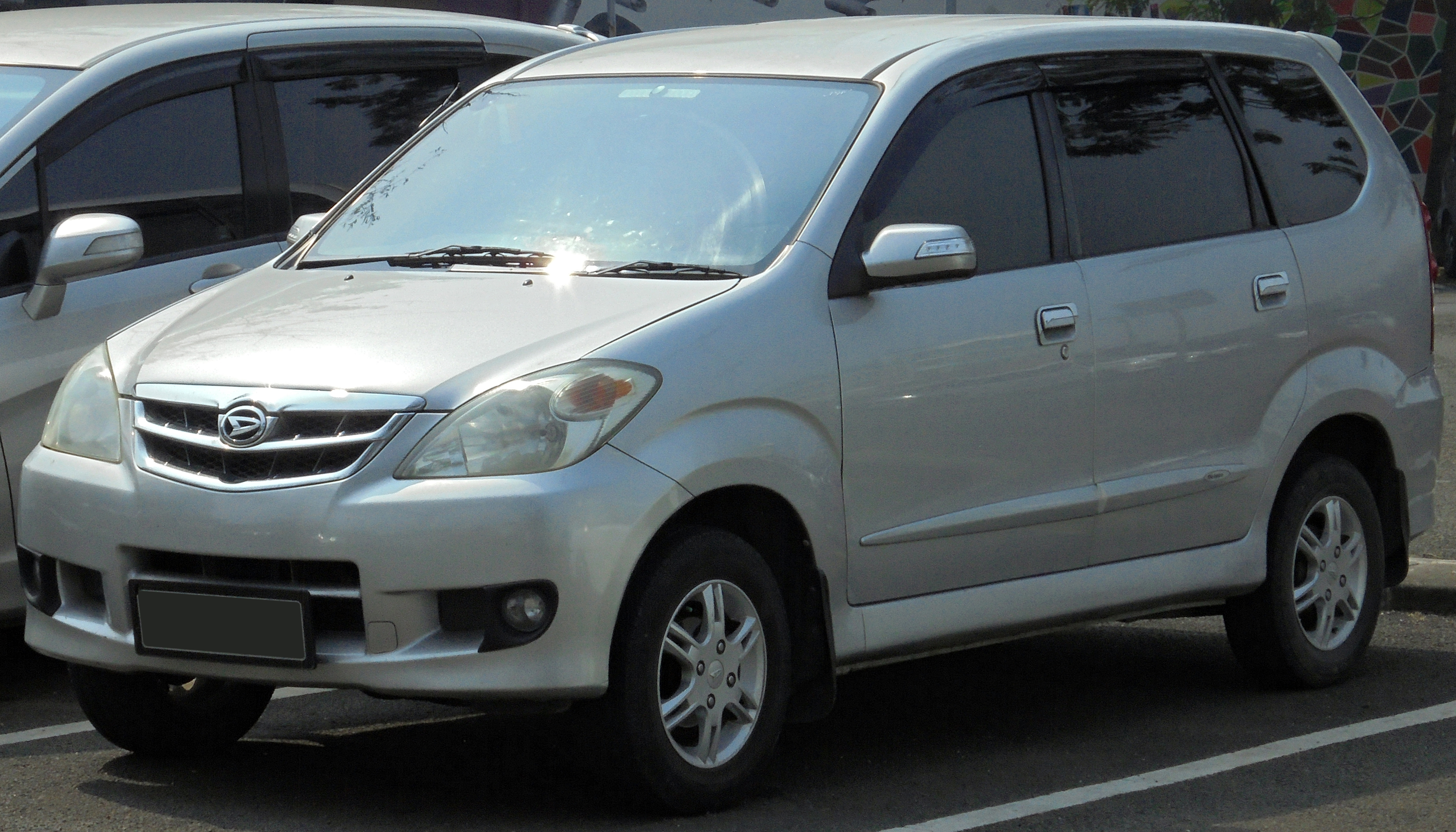
2010 Xenia 1.3 Xi Deluxe (F601RV; facelift, Indonesia)

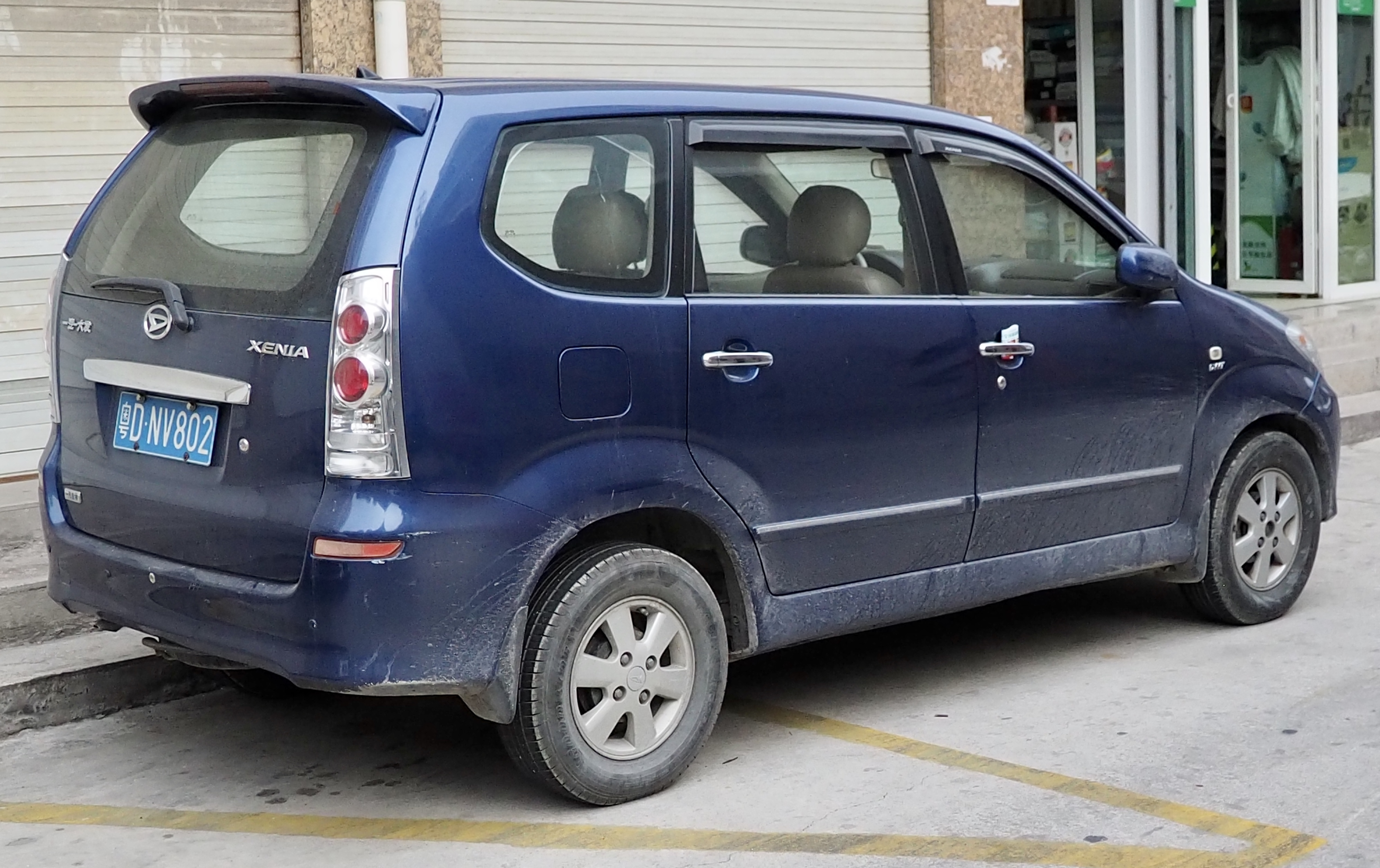
FAW-Daihatsu Xenia (China)

=== FAW Senya M80/S80 ===
In China, Daihatsu together with First Automotive Works (FAW) launched the first-generation Xenia as the FAW Senya M80 (Chinese: 一汽森雅M80; pinyin: Yīqì Sēnyǎ M80) on 21 June 2007. The Senya M80 was originally simply called the FAW Senya, but later developed a whole range of products based on the Senya platform and was soon renamed to Senya M80. The crossover-styled version called the Senya S80 was introduced later. Production in China was carried out at FAW Jilin Auto until 2010.

The Senya S80 was revealed during the 2010 Beijing Auto Show. Starting from the M80 and S80 of the Senya series, FAW Jilin started the Chinese brand Senia (森雅), which later became a brand focusing on crossovers. A later facelift changed the front and rear ends of the Senya S80 which departs it from the Daihatsu-derived designs.

FAW sold 223,461 units during its production until the Senya M80/S80 was discontinued in 2016.

A rebadged Senya S80 was also sold in North Korea by Pyeonghwa Motors as the Ppeokkugi 1509 since 2013.

==== Gallery ====
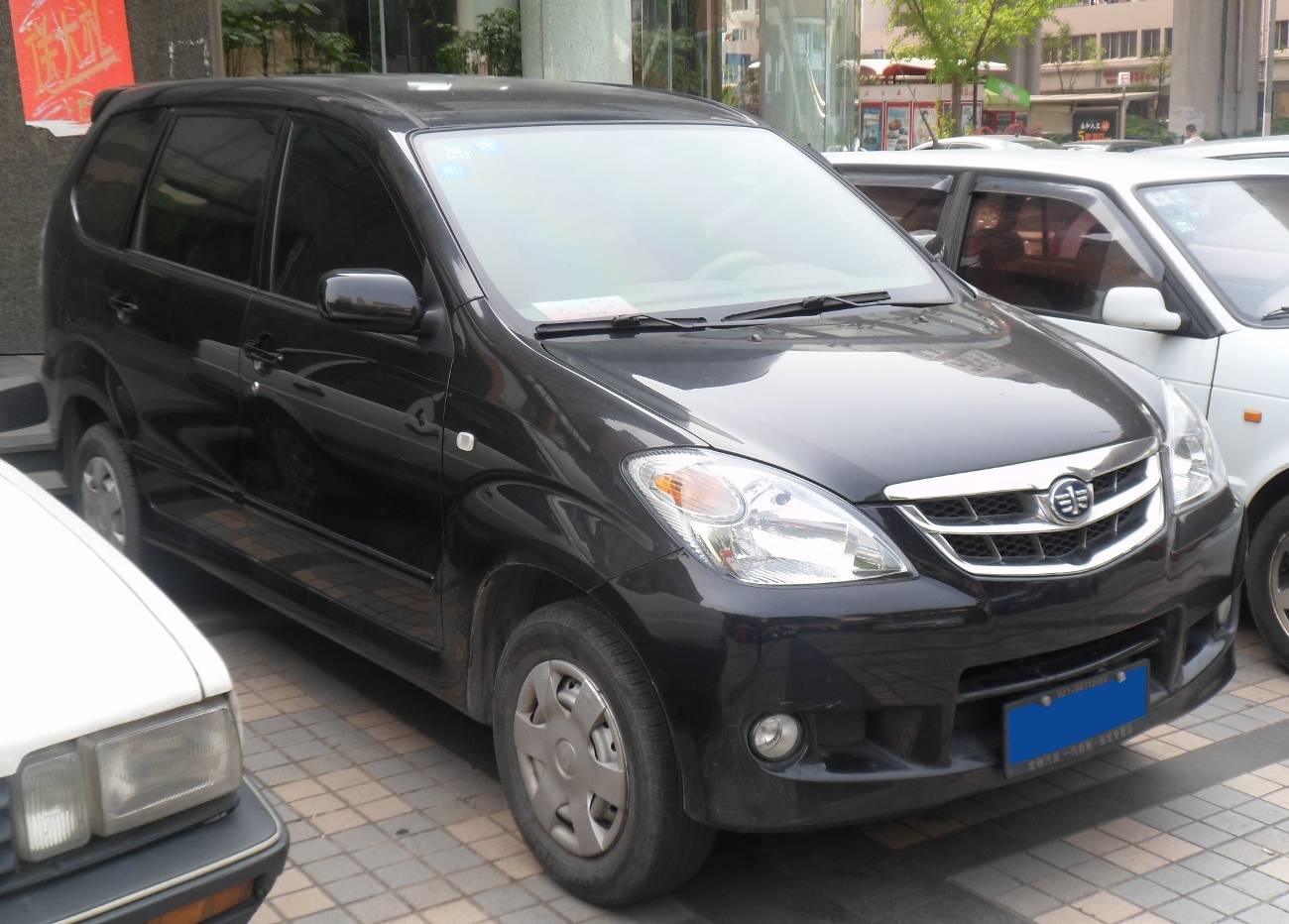
FAW Senya M80 (China)

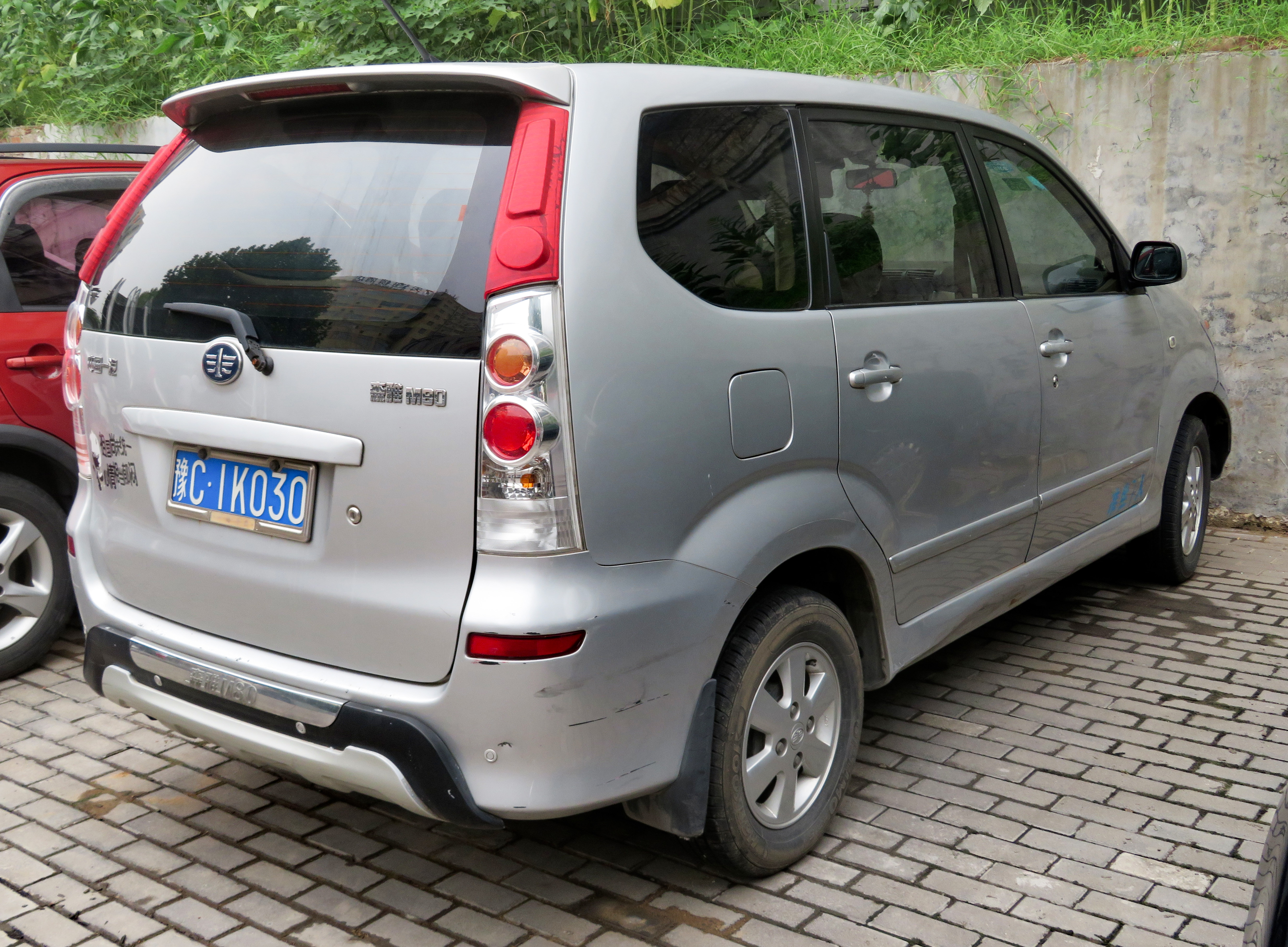
Senya M80 (China)

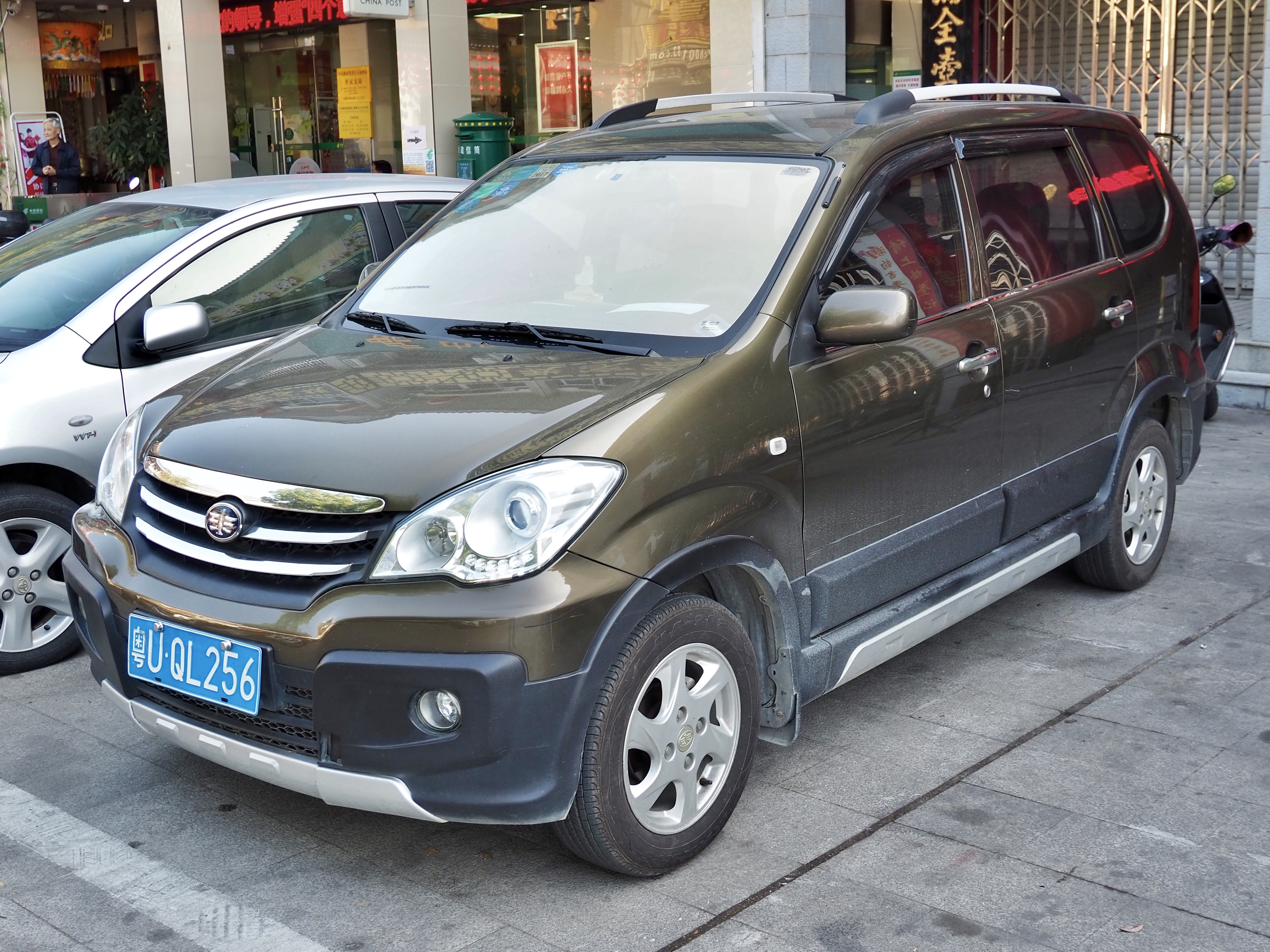
Senya S80 (pre-facelift, China)

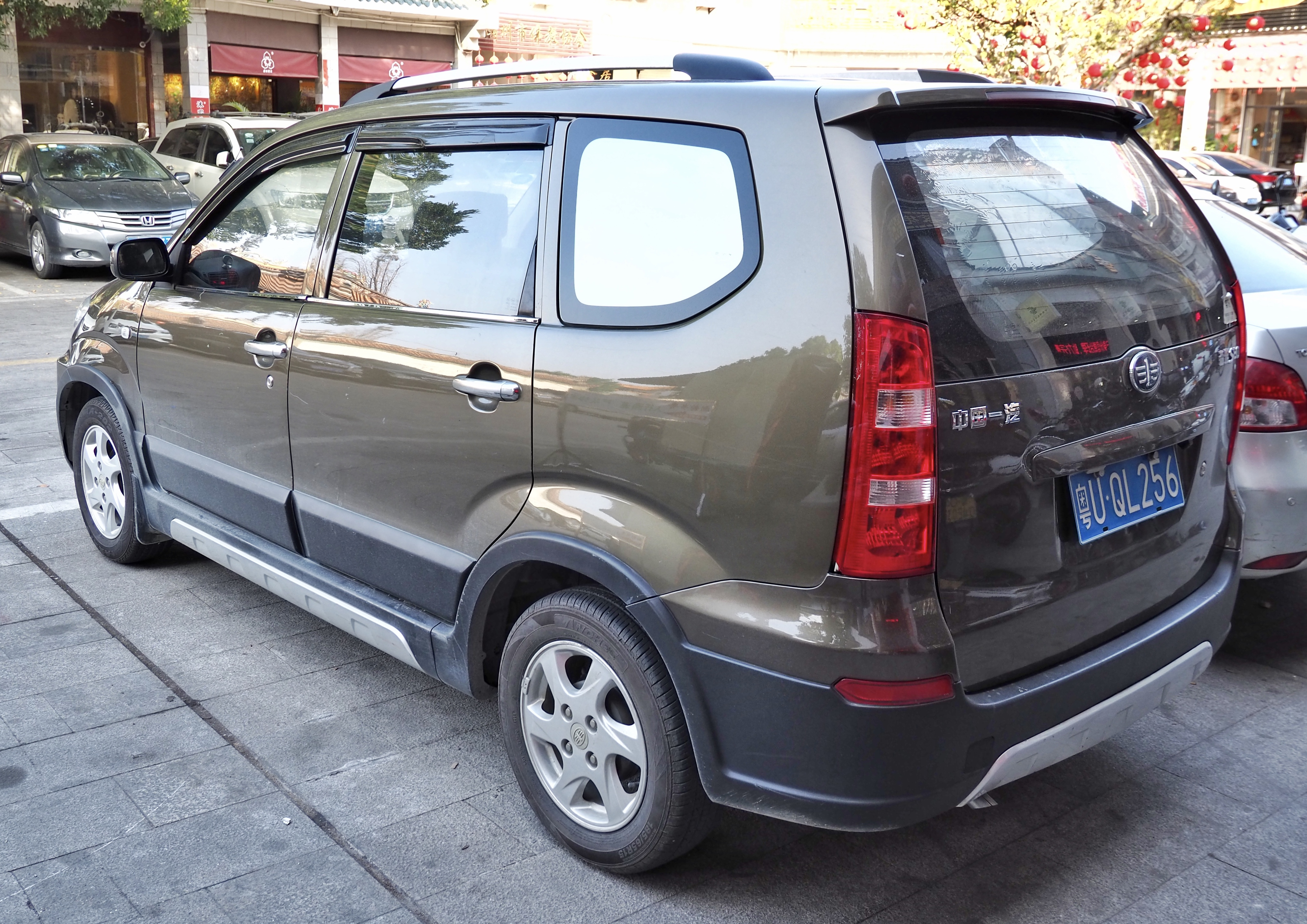
Senya S80 (pre-facelift, China)

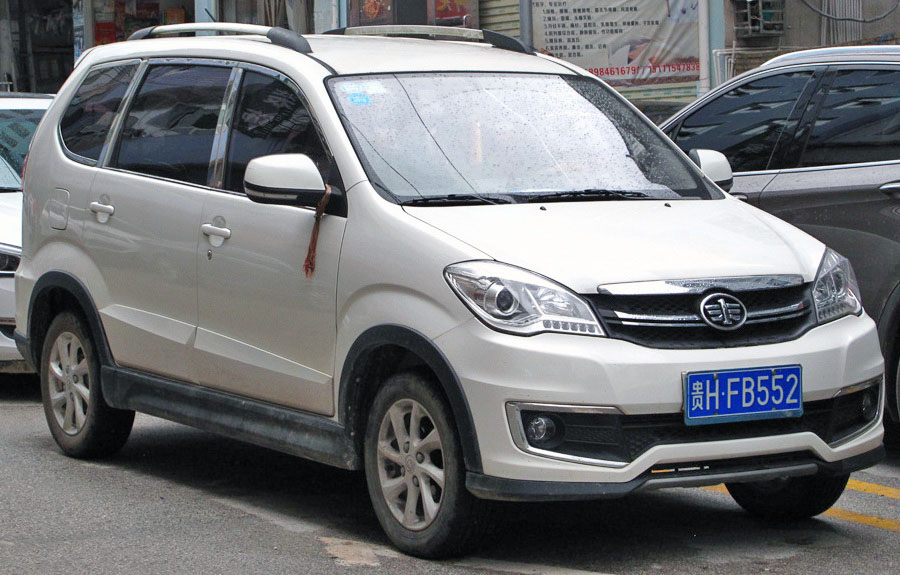
Senya S80 (facelift, China)

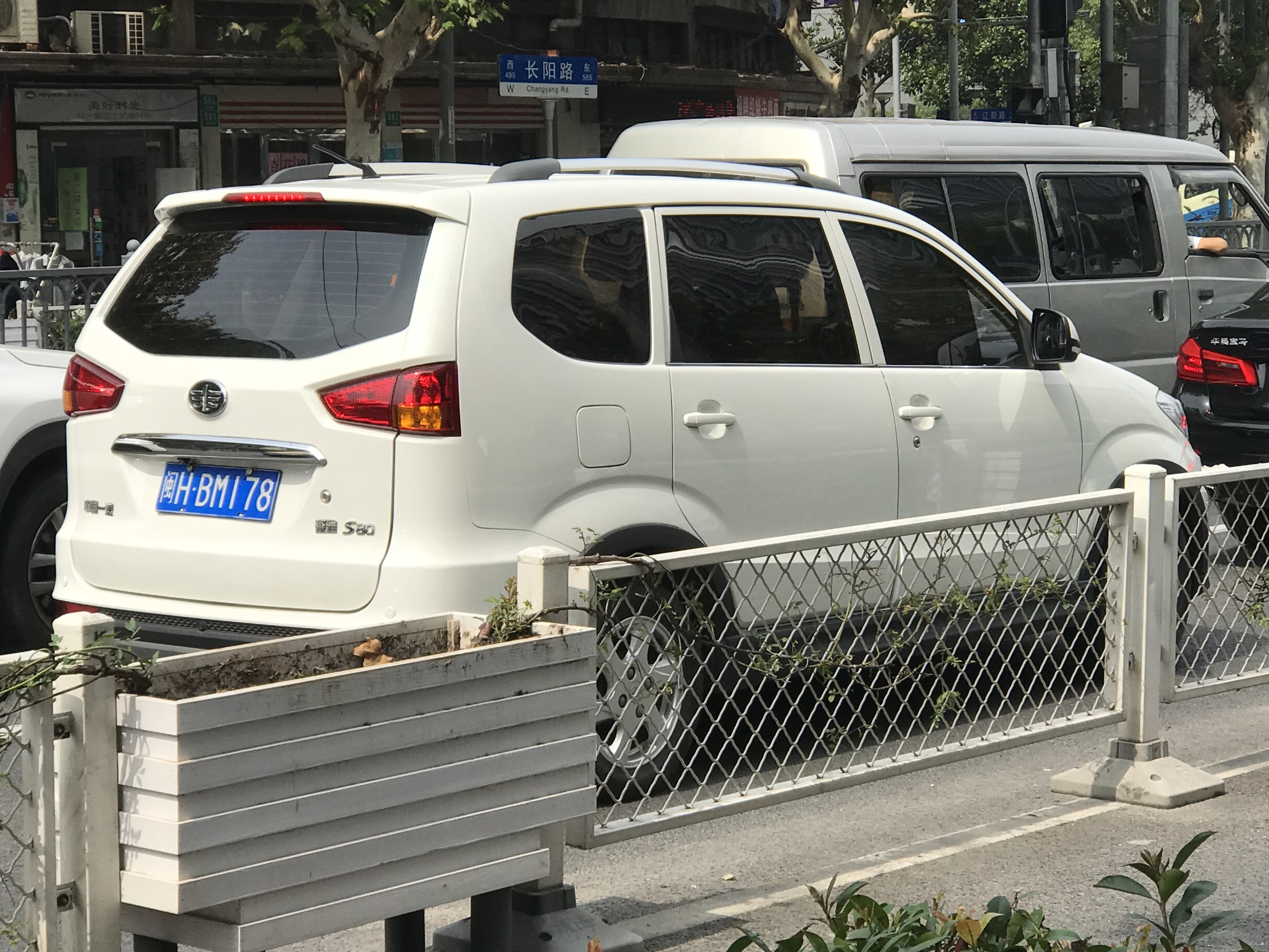
Senya S80 (facelift, China)

== Second generation (F650; 2011) ==
Second generation
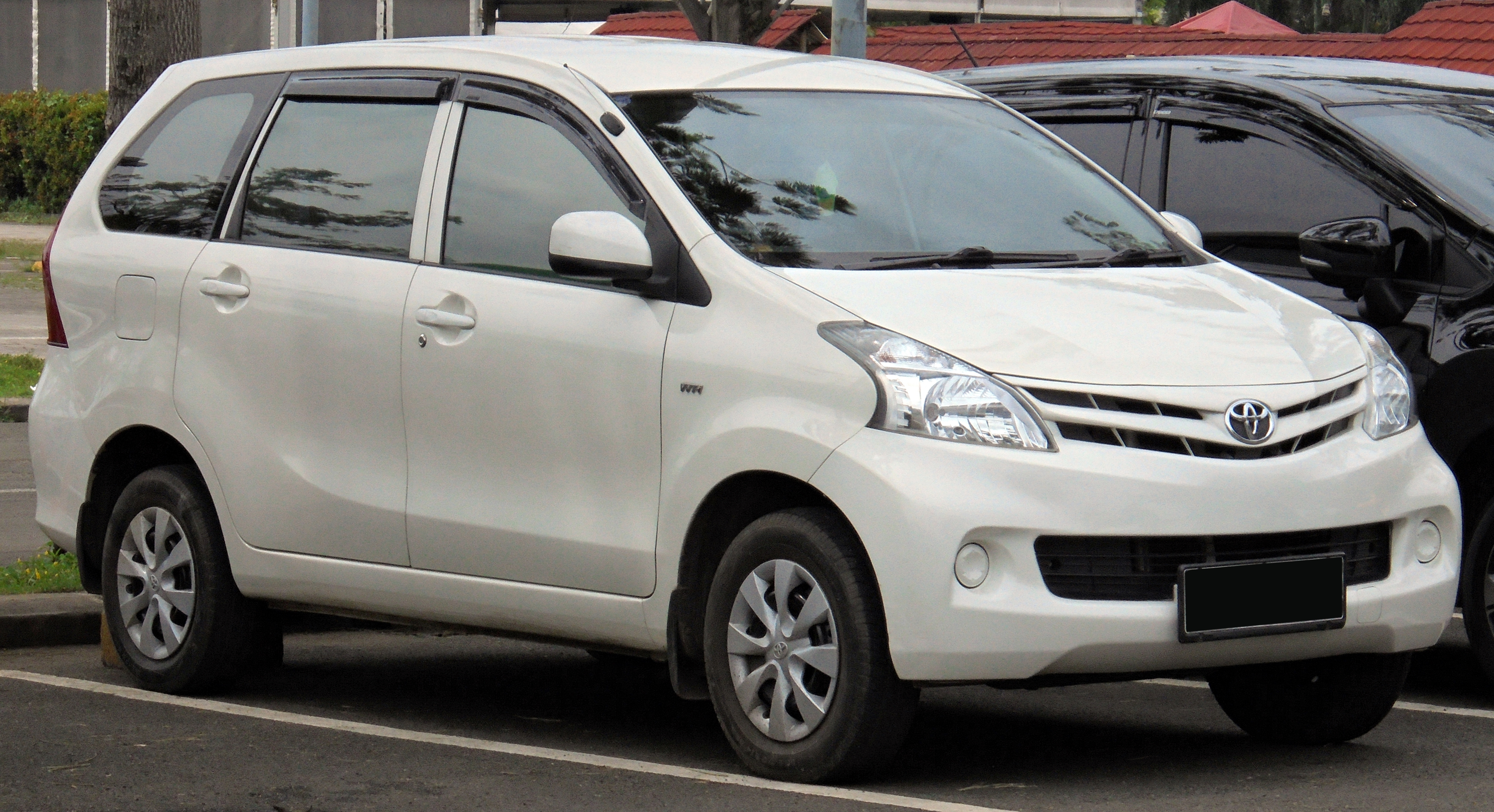
- 2014 Avanza 1.3 E (F651RM; pre-facelift, Indonesia)

Overview
- Model code: F650
- Also called: Daihatsu Xenia; Toyota Transmover (fleet only, 2016–2023)
- Production: November 2011 – January 2023 (Xenia); November 2011 – July 2023 (Avanza/Transmover)
- Assembly: Indonesia: Sunter, North Jakarta; Karawang, West Java (ADM)
- Designer: List: Hiroaki Hakamata and Yukinobu Morioka (pre-facelift and 2015 facelift); Satoshi Kimura (pre-facelift); Mark Widjaja (Avanza Veloz and 2019 facelift); Indra Madyana and Wahyu Kusuma Danny (Avanza Luxury); Jiro Matsueda and Satoshi Isayama (2015 facelift); Zaki Mubarok and Donny Adhi Yuwono (2019 facelift)

Body and chassis
- Class: Mini MPV
- Layout: Front-engine, rear-wheel-drive
- Related: Toyota Rush (F800)

Powertrain
- Engine: Petrol: 989 cc EJ-VE I3 (F650; Xenia only); 1298 cc K3-VE I4 (F651); 1329 cc 1NR-VE I4 (F653); 1495 cc 3SZ-VE I4 (F652; Avanza only); 1496 cc 2NR-VE I4 (F654)
- Power output: 46 kW (63 PS; 62 hp) (EJ-VE); 68 kW (92 PS; 91 hp) (K3-VE); 71 kW (97 PS; 95 hp) (1NR-VE); 76.5 kW (104 PS; 103 hp) (3SZ-VE/2NR-VE)
- Transmission: 5-speed manual; 4-speed automatic

Dimensions
- Wheelbase: 2,655 mm (104.5 in)
- Length: 4,140 mm (163.0 in) (pre-facelift); 4,190–4,200 mm (165.0–165.4 in) (facelift)
- Width: 1,660 mm (65.4 in)
- Height: 1,685–1,695 mm (66.3–66.7 in)
- Kerb weight: 1,005–1,130 kg (2,216–2,491 lb)

Chronology
- Successor: Toyota Rumion (South Africa)

The second-generation Avanza was launched on 9 November 2011 in Indonesia with development led by Toyota chief engineer Kaoru Hosokawa.

According to Toyota's South African division, the second-generation Avanza has been made approximately 20 kg (44 lb) lighter. Along with the use of low rolling resistance tyres, enhanced air conditioner regulation and electric power steering, the vehicle was reported to have achieved a substantial increase in fuel efficiency.

The second-generation Avanza was engineered with a 25 mm (1.0 in) wider track and wider wheels to enhance its stability. The MacPherson strut suspension at the front and the four-link design with a lateral control rod and a solid axle at the back have been revised to improve ride quality and suppress swaying when changing direction. In the cabin, the second-generation Avanza has thinner seatbacks to enhance knee room in the second and third rows. Additionally, the depth of the boot area was expanded by 18 mm (0.7 in) due to its longer body.

In 12 August 2015, the Avanza was updated with Dual VVT-i and received the new NR series engine; 1.3 L 1NR-VE (F653) which replaced the 1.3 L K3-VE, and 1.5 L 2NR-VE (F654) which replaced the 1.5 L 3SZ-VE.

=== Markets ===
==== Indonesia ====
The second-generation Avanza is available in three grade levels and two engine options, from low to highest: 1.3 E, 1.3 G, 1.5 G, and 1.5 Veloz. All grade levels and Veloz offered in both manual and automatic transmission, except for 1.5 G that came as a manual-only grade. The Veloz was introduced to replace the S grade in the previous generation.

On 15 May 2013, dual SRS airbags and front seatbelts with force limiter and pre-tensioner became standard in all Avanza models. On that same year, all Avanza models also got some interior improvements, including redesigned seats, improved interior NVH (Noise, Vibration, Harshness) dampening, and redesigned 2nd row headrest.

The Avanza received its first facelift on 12 August 2015 with development led by chief engineer Kazuhiko Yamashita. The changes consist of a newer engine, where the previous K3-VE engine replaced by a 1.3-litre 1NR-VE Dual VVT-i unit, while the 3SZ-VE engine replaced by a 1.5-litre 2NR-VE Dual VVT-i unit. Other changes includes an updated front and rear fascias, speedometer design, interior colour, new Double DIN head unit with Bluetooth connectivity and ABS/EBD as standard (previously only available on Veloz grade). The Veloz grade also received a 1.3-litre engine option, which can be equipped with either manual or automatic transmission. Drive-by-wire system became standard in all models. The "Avanza" branding was omitted in marketing materials for the Veloz grade.

A special edition called the "Avanza Limited Edition" was released at 2017 Gaikindo Indonesia International Auto Show, with only 150 units being produced. This edition was based on the 1.5 G grade and is limited to a manual transmission and a white exterior colour. Features include side skirts, additional DRLs below the foglights, and a "Limited" emblem on the rear.

The Avanza received its second facelift on 15 January 2019 with development led by chief engineer Kazutoshi Sakamoto. The front fascia was redesigned with a split-styled headlights, while the side mirrors is shared with the F800 series Rush. The rear fascia also received an update. LED headlights became standard on all variants, along with shark fin-type antenna, updated alloy wheel design and interior colour, digital air conditioner controls, auto retractable outer mirror (for G and Veloz grades), keyless entry system with push start engine button (for Veloz grade), and revised suspension tunings.

The GR Limited variant for the Veloz grade was launched on 9 August 2021, which also replaced the regular model. It came with a Gazoo Racing-branded bodykit, with black-coloured mirror cover and alloy wheels. No changes were made to the interior. Powertrain options also remain the same with 1.3-litre and 1.5-litre engines. Production lasted until October 2021 with 3,805 units sold.

===== Transmover =====
In November 2016, Toyota-Astra Motor introduced the Toyota Transmover (downgraded Avanza below the E grade) for fleet usage in the market. It also replaces the Vios-based Limo sedan for taxicab usage. After the 2019 facelift for the Avanza, the Transmover retained the previous front fascia while received improvements from the second facelift Avanza such as retuned suspension, digital air conditioner controls, and shark fin-type antenna.

Between November 2021 and mid-2023, the Transmover continues to be sold as a single variant along with the newer W100 Avanza. Production ceased in mid-2023 and was replaced by the W100-based Transmover.

==== Malaysia ====
The second-generation Avanza was launched in Malaysia on 11 January 2012. Unlike the first-generation model, the car was not assembled in Malaysia in favour of the first-generation Perodua Alza. It was initially available in four grade levels: 1.3 E, 1.5 E, 1.5 G and 1.5 S (known in Indonesia as the Veloz). The 1.3-litre models was powered by the K3-VE VVT-i engine with a 5-speed manual transmission. while the 1.5-litre models was powered by the 3SZ-VE VVT-i engine with a 4-speed automatic transmission. The facelift version was launched in October 2015. In February 2018, the 1.5 X grade was added to the range and positioned above the 1.5 S. It had several aesthetic add-ons to give the exterior a more rugged, crossover-inspired appearance. The second facelift Avanza was launched in Malaysia on 17 May 2019, with all models received the front fascia from the Indonesian market Veloz. Three grade levels were offered: 1.5 E, 1.5 S and 1.5 S+. The blind spot monitor and rear-cross traffic alert safety equipment was offered on the 1.5 S+ grade. It was replaced by the W100 series Veloz in 2022.

==== Philippines ====
The second-generation Avanza was launched in the Philippines on 13 January 2012. It was available in three grade levels: 1.3 J, 1.3 E and 1.5 G. The first facelift was launched in September 2015 and the second facelift in May 2019 respectively. In October 2017, the fourth grade was added to the line up: 1.5 Veloz. In the 2019 facelift, the G and Veloz grades received a 6.8-inch infotainment screen.

The van version of the Avanza was also offered which was set below the base variant that has only two seats, without radio, no speaker (with radio and 2 speakers, optional) and has steel wheels. The second and third row seats are removed to make room for the cargo area. It was only offered in white colour and powered with a 1.3-litre engine (with 5-speed manual transmission only).

==== Singapore ====
The second-generation Avanza was available in Singapore from November 2013, slotting in the MPV segment as a more affordable choice below the Wish. Only the 1.5 S grade was available with a four-speed automatic transmission. The Avanza later received a facelift in early 2016 but was discontinued in November that year with the launch of the Sienta.

==== Thailand ====
The second-generation Avanza was available in Thailand from 10 January 2012 in three grade levels: the 1.5 E; available with a 5-speed manual transmission, 1.5 G and 1.5 S; available with a 4-speed automatic transmission. It received facelifts in 2015 and 2019, and was replaced by the W100 series Veloz in 2022.

=== Gallery ===
Pre-facelift

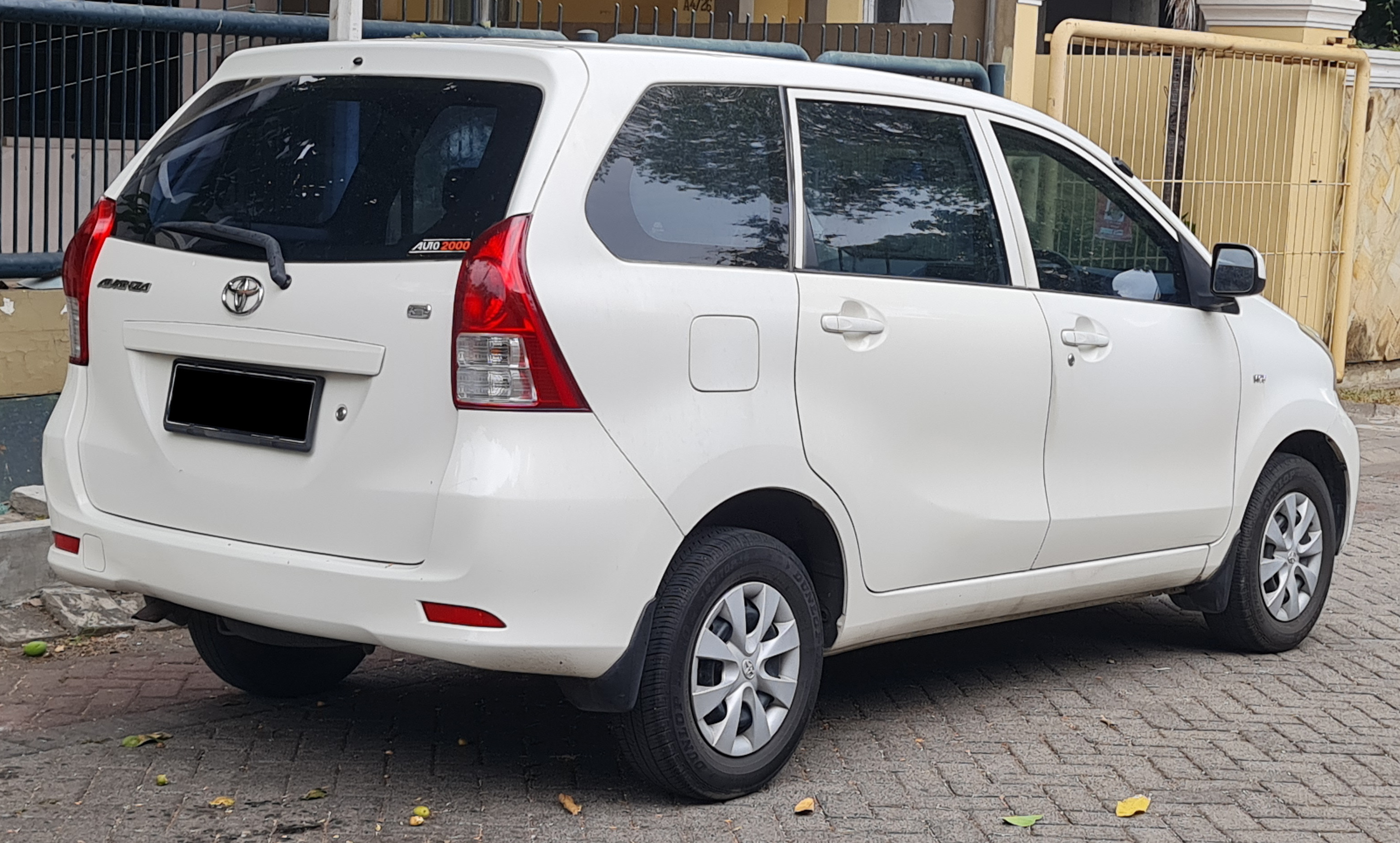
2015 Avanza 1.3 E (F651RM, Indonesia)

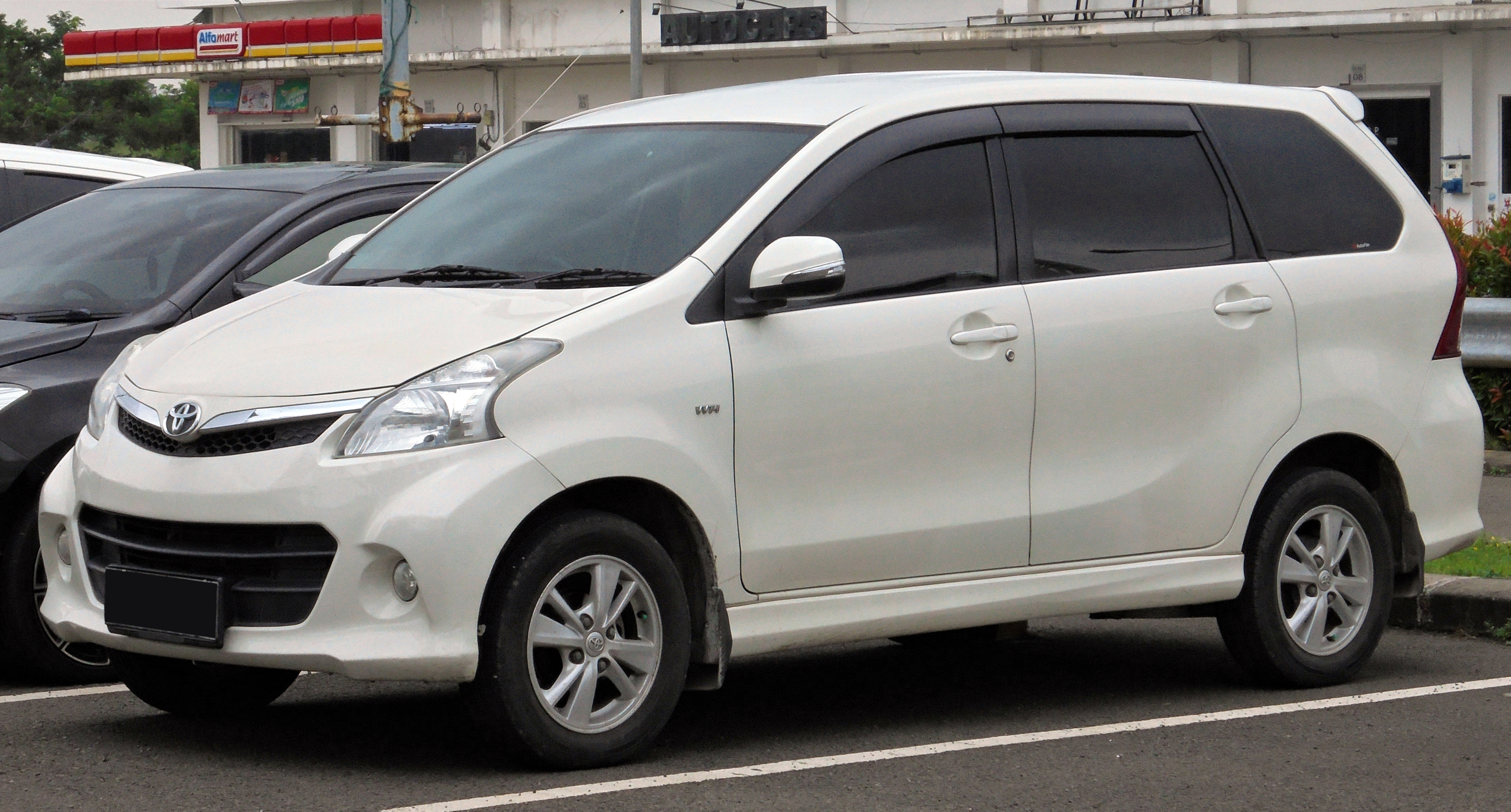
2012 Avanza 1.5 Veloz (F652RM, Indonesia)

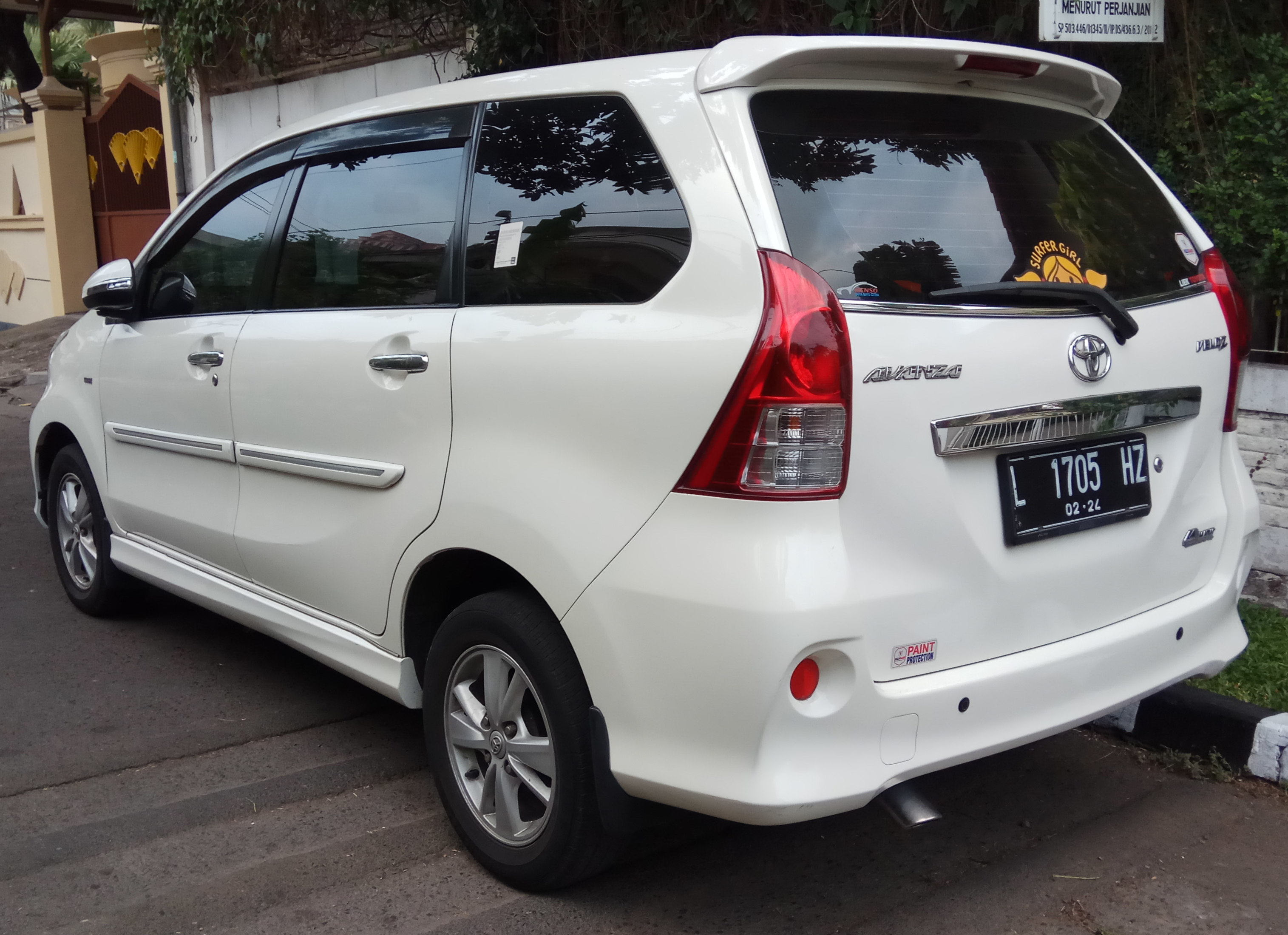
2014 Avanza 1.5 Veloz (F652RM, Indonesia)

First facelift

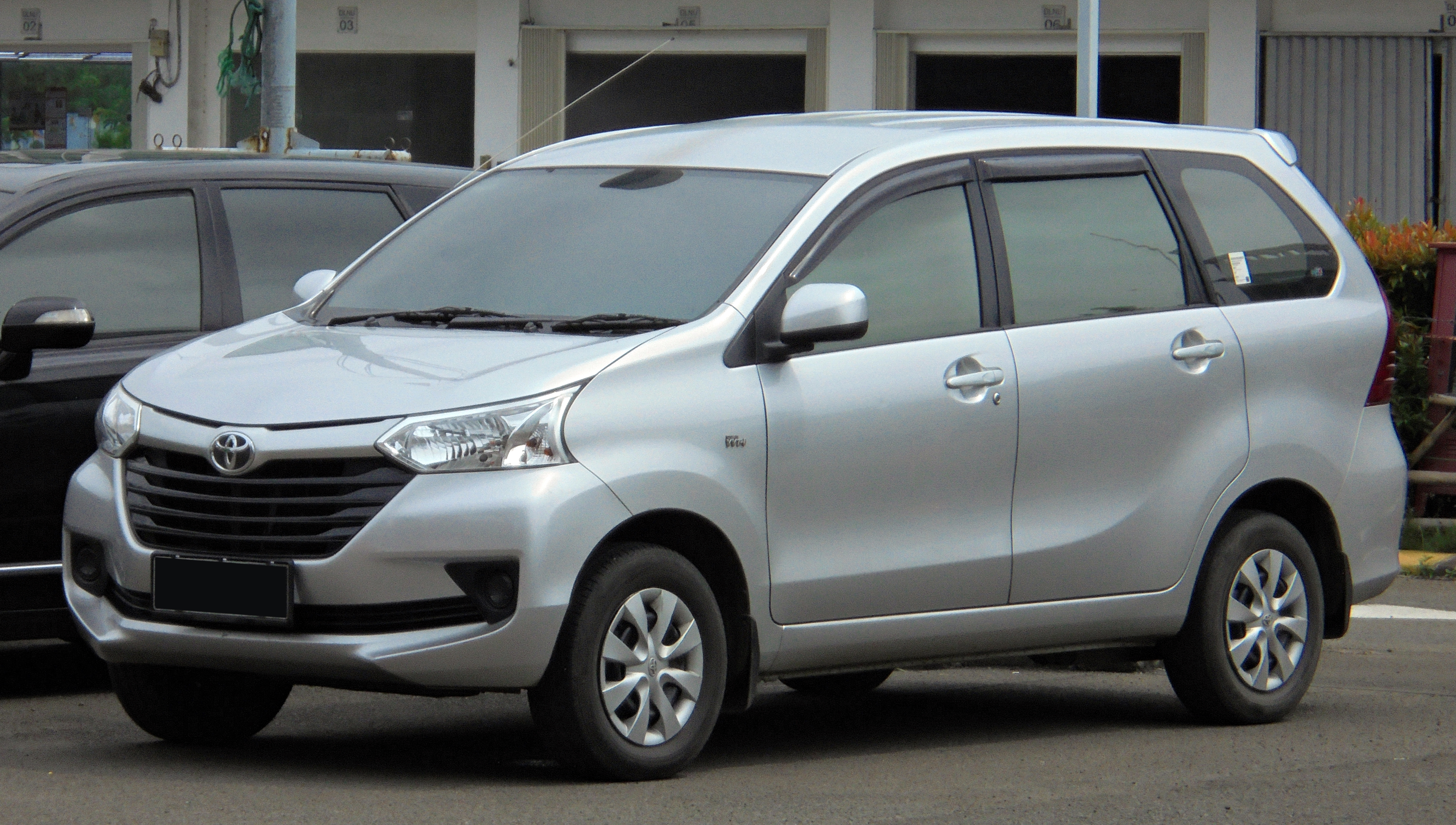
2016 Avanza 1.3 E (F653RM, Indonesia)

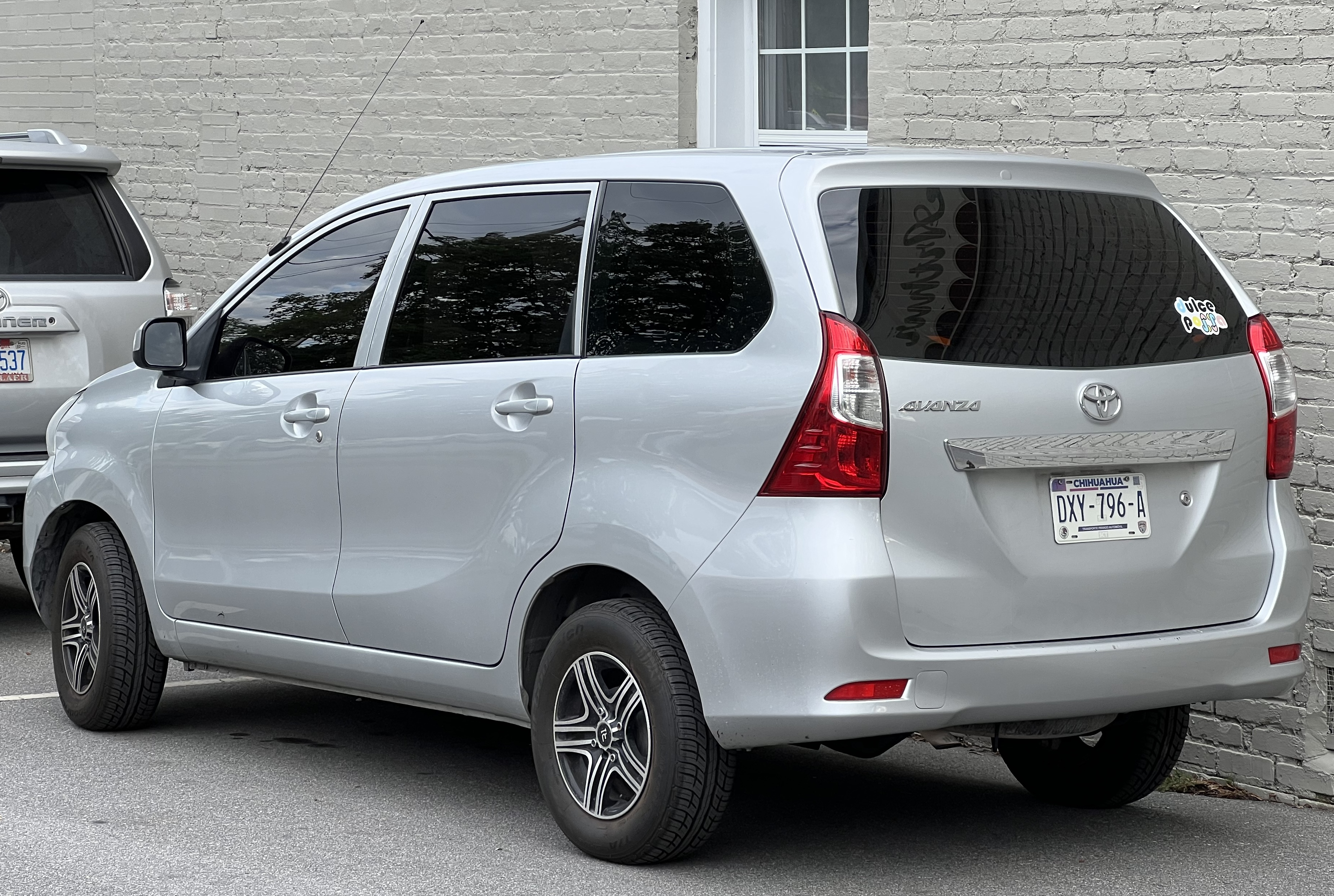
Avanza LE (F654LM, Mexico)

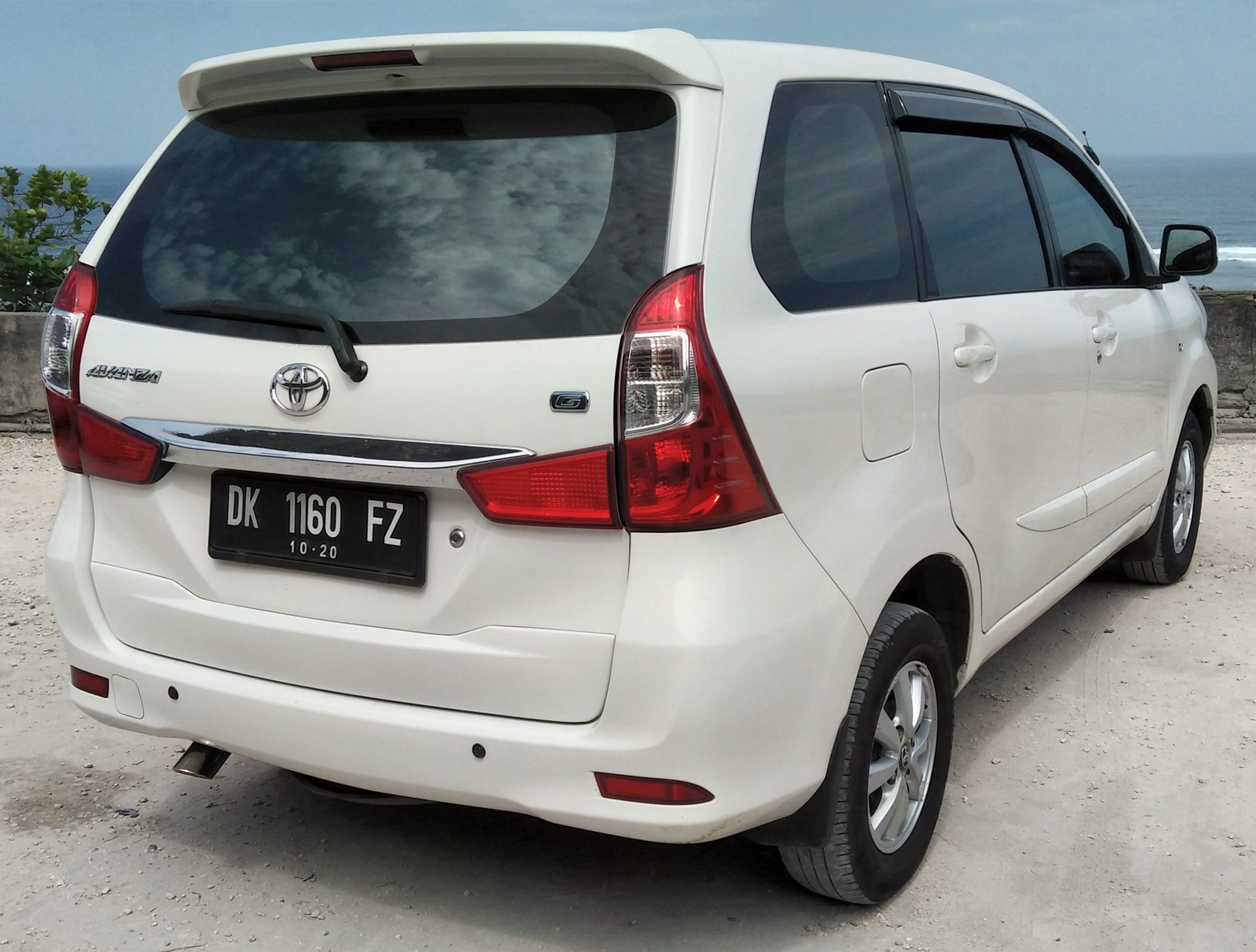
2015 Avanza 1.3 G (F653RM, Indonesia)

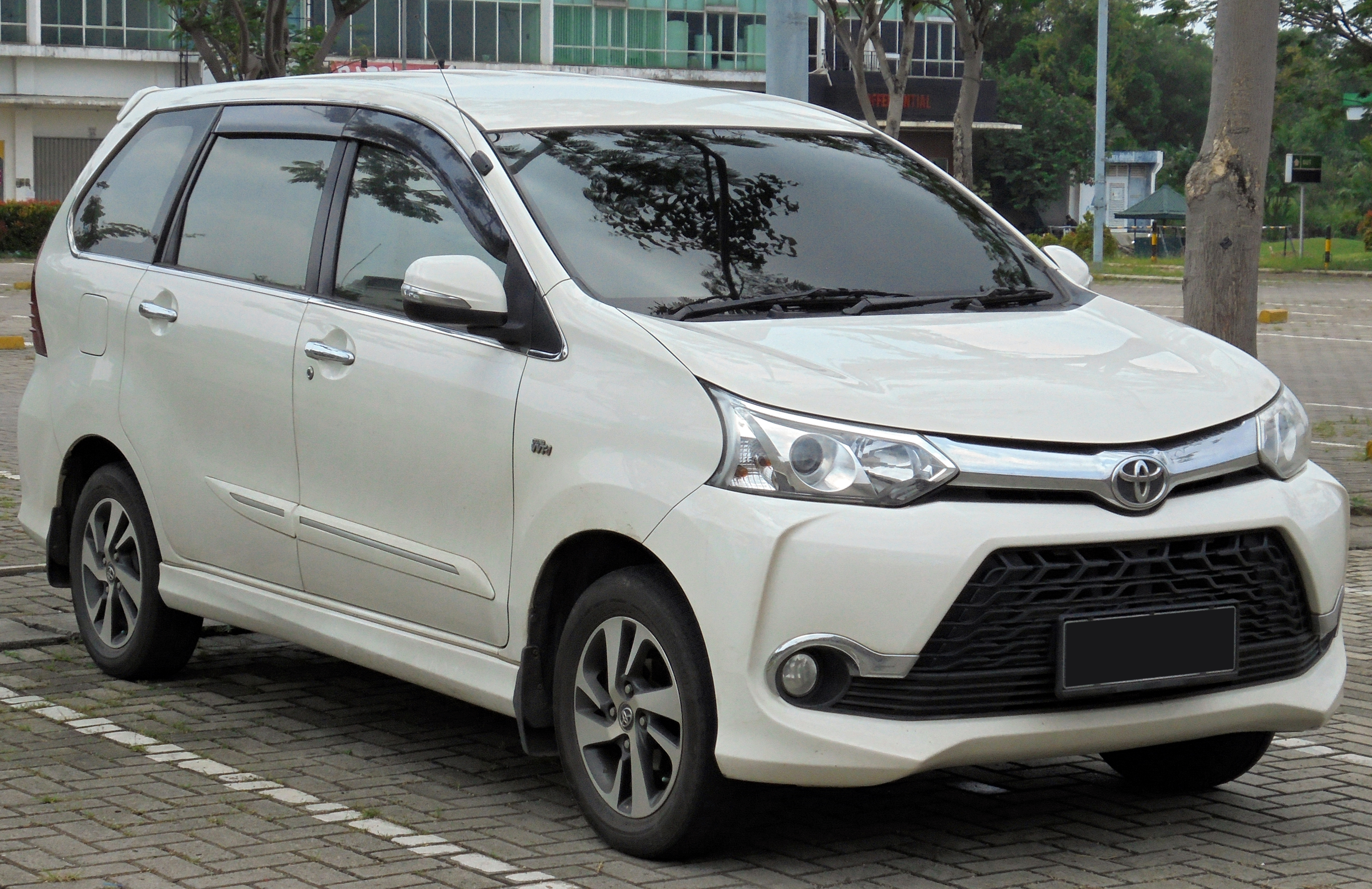
2016 Avanza 1.5 Veloz (F654RM, Indonesia)

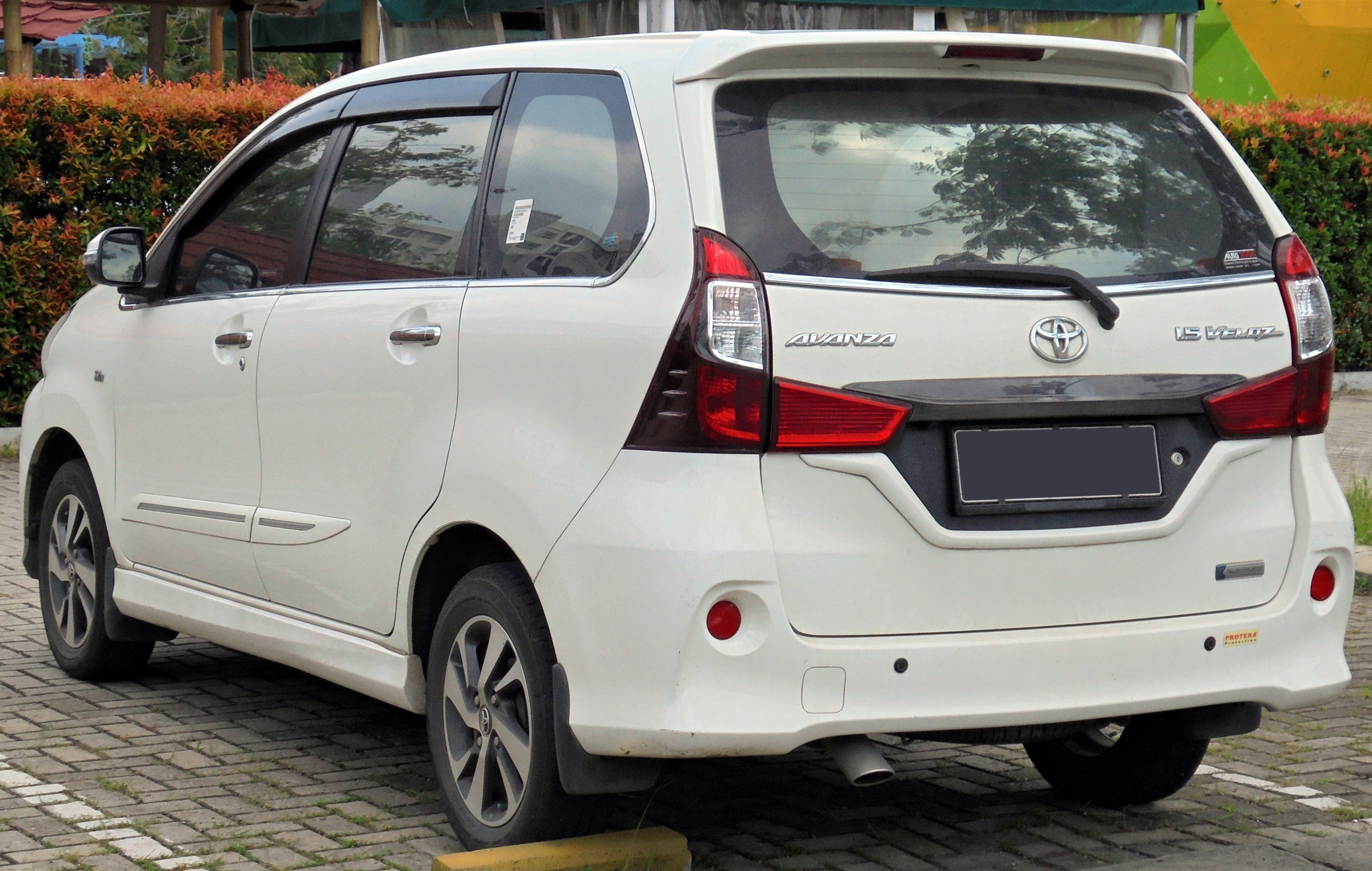
2016 Avanza 1.5 Veloz (F654RM, Indonesia)

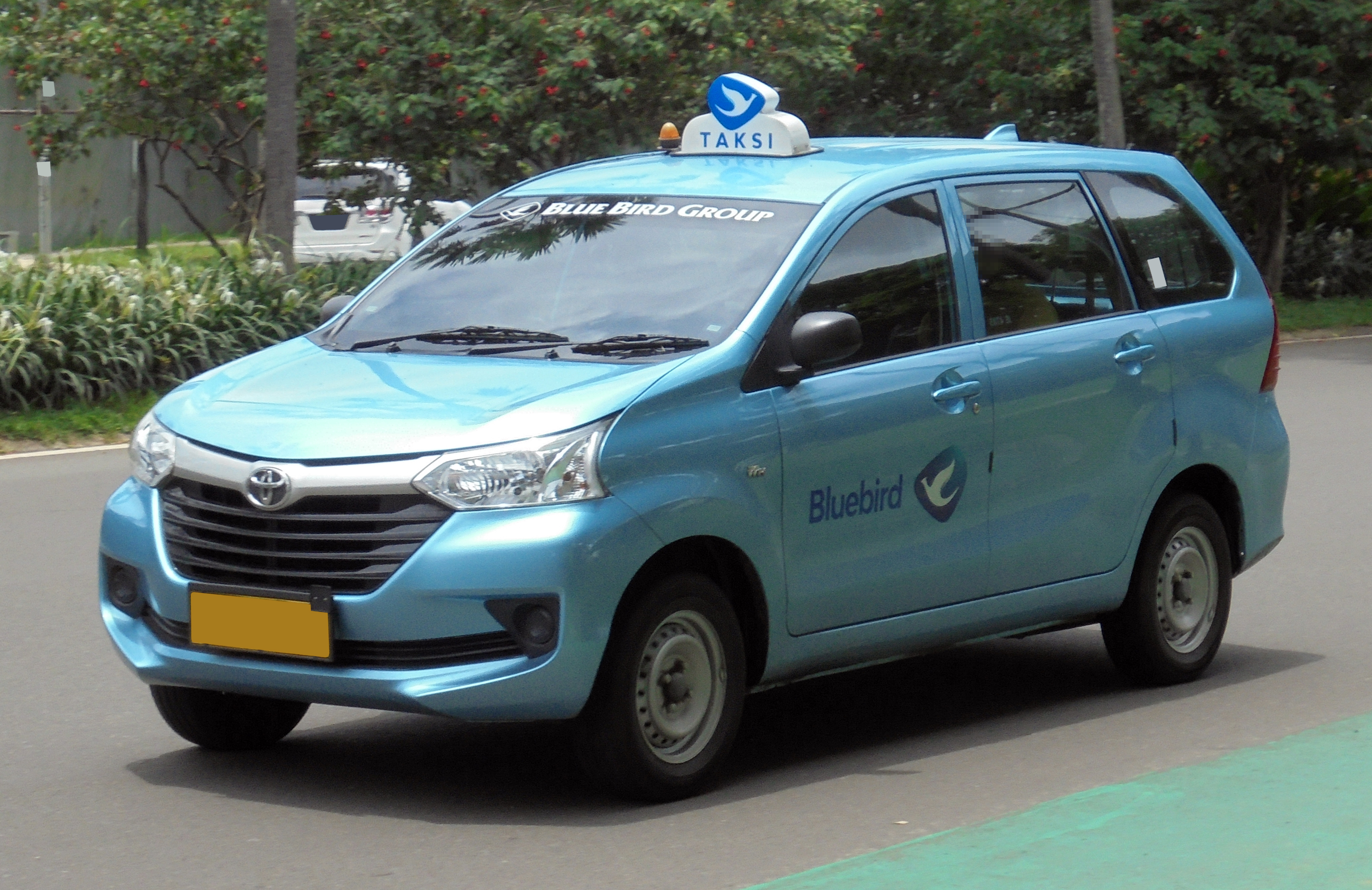
2019 Transmover taxi (F653RM, Indonesia)

Second facelift

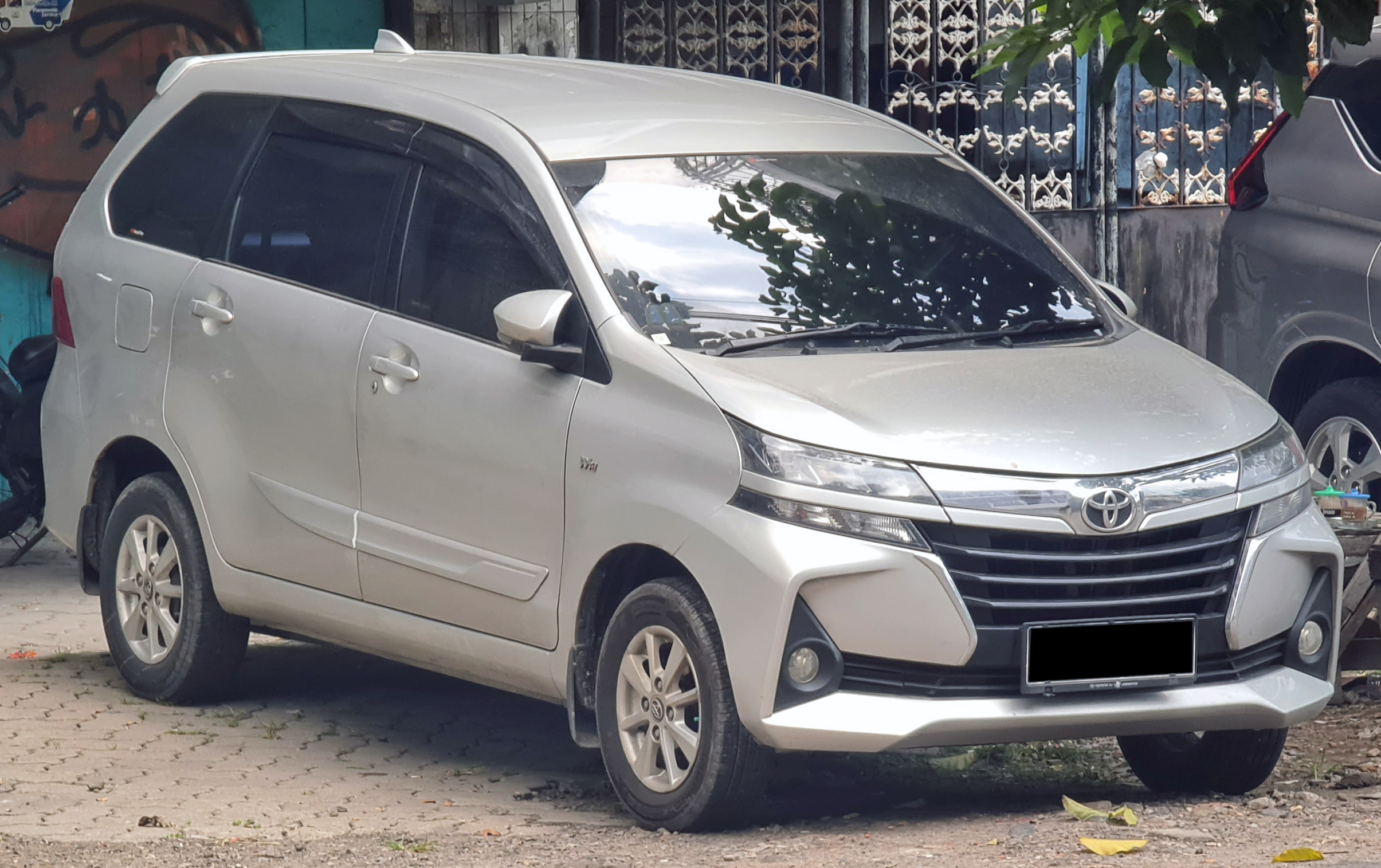
2019 Avanza 1.3 G (F653RM, Indonesia)

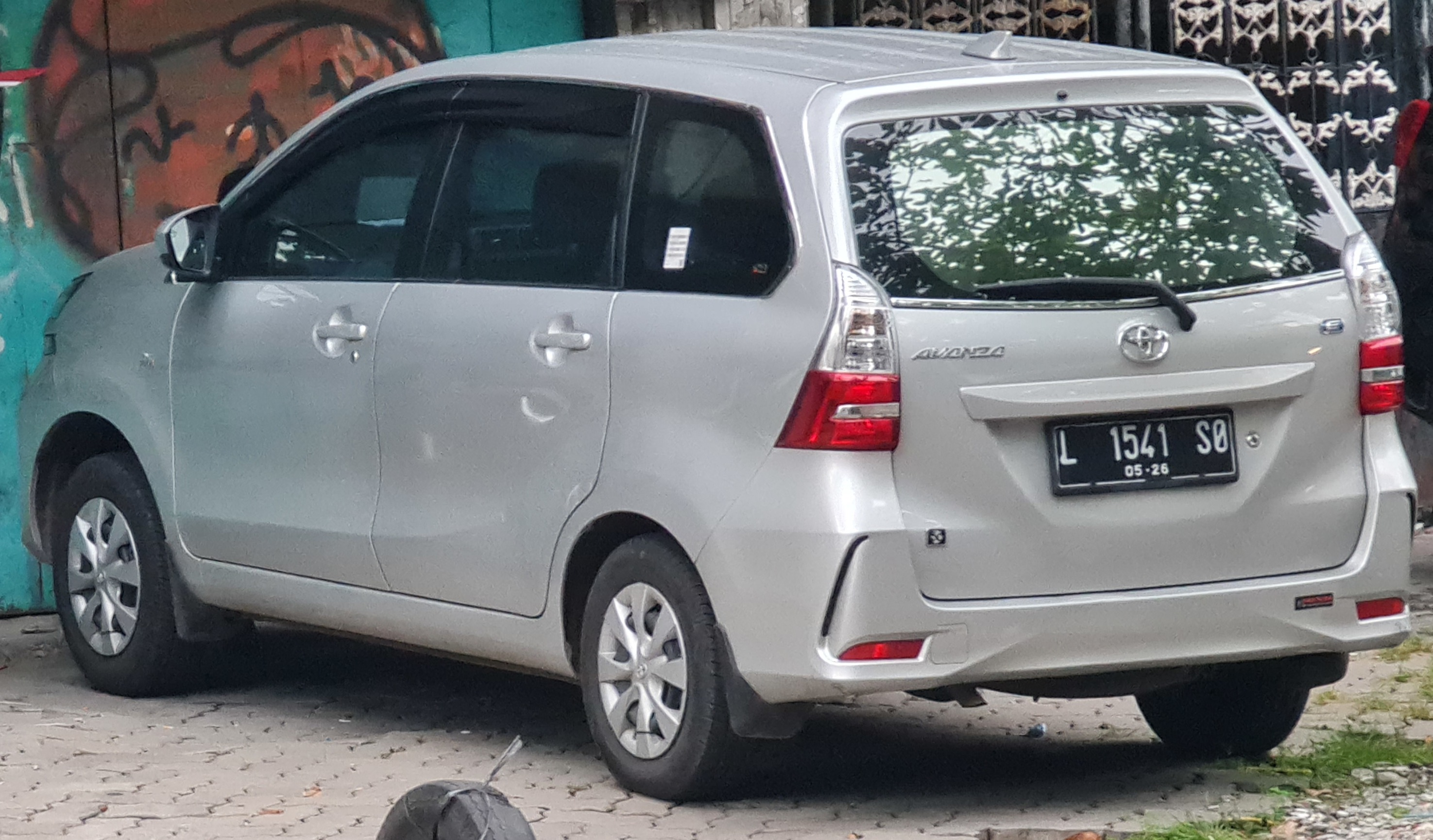
2021 Avanza 1.3 E (F653RM, Indonesia)

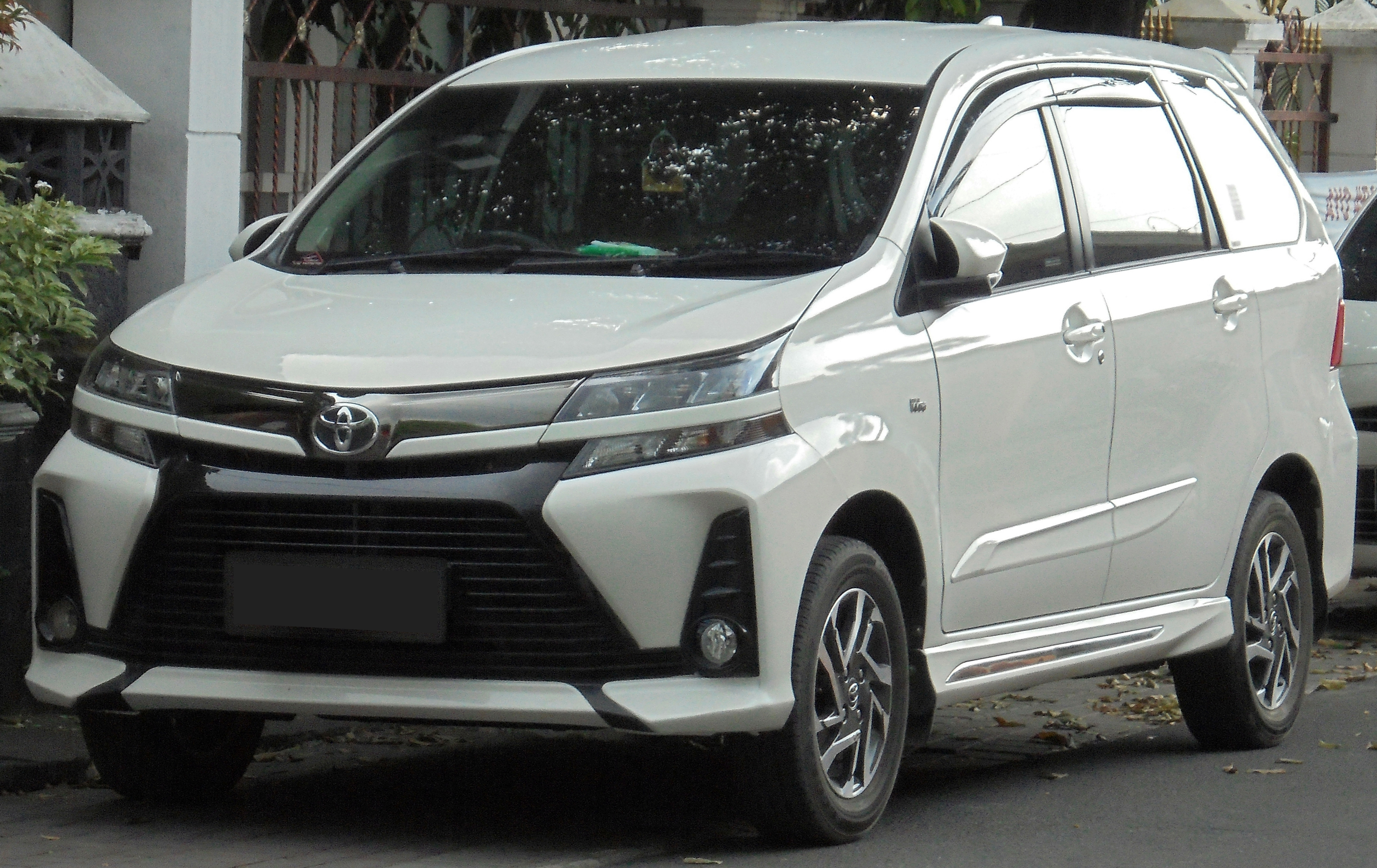
2019 Avanza 1.5 Veloz (F654RM, Indonesia)

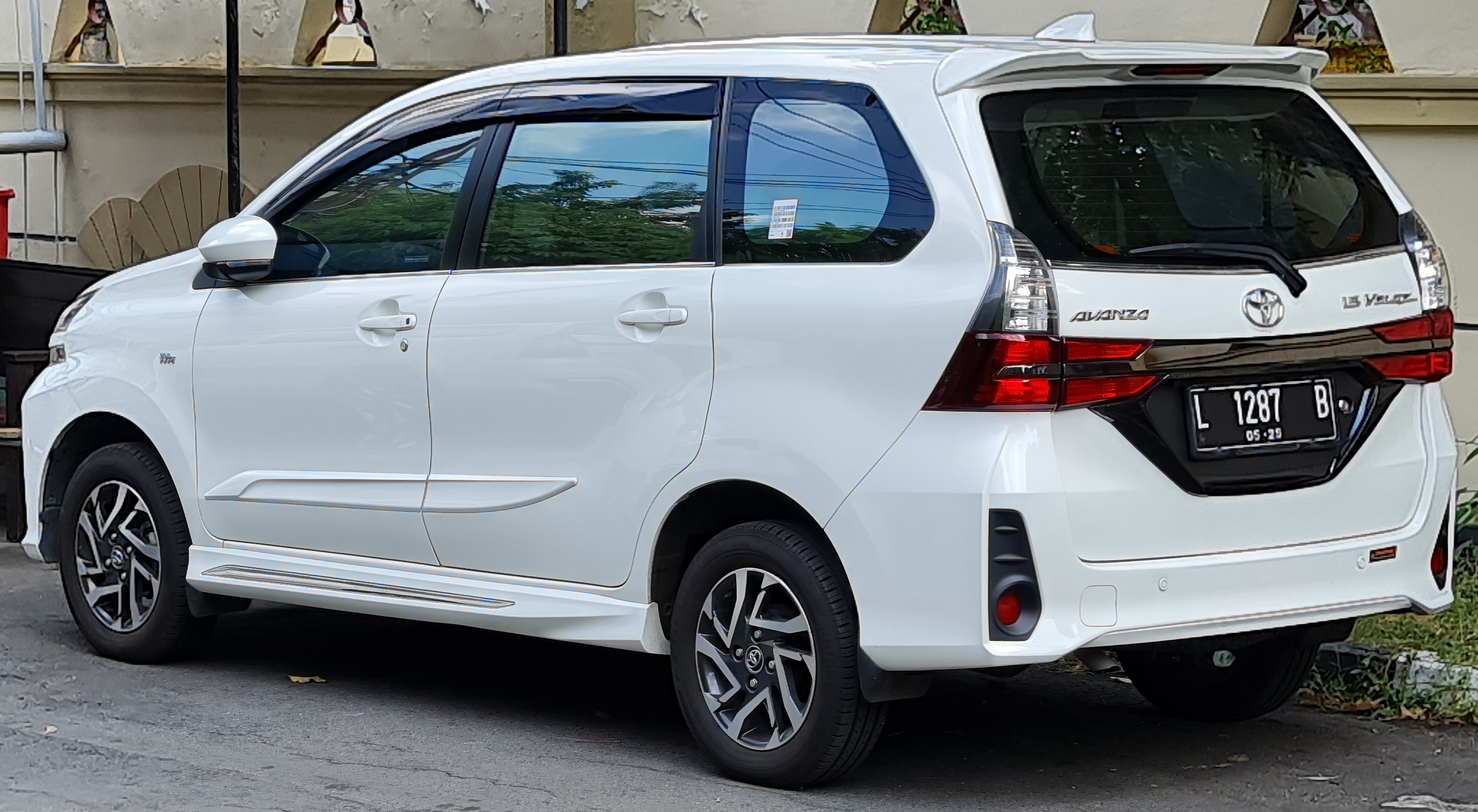
2020 Avanza 1.5 Veloz (F654RM, Indonesia)

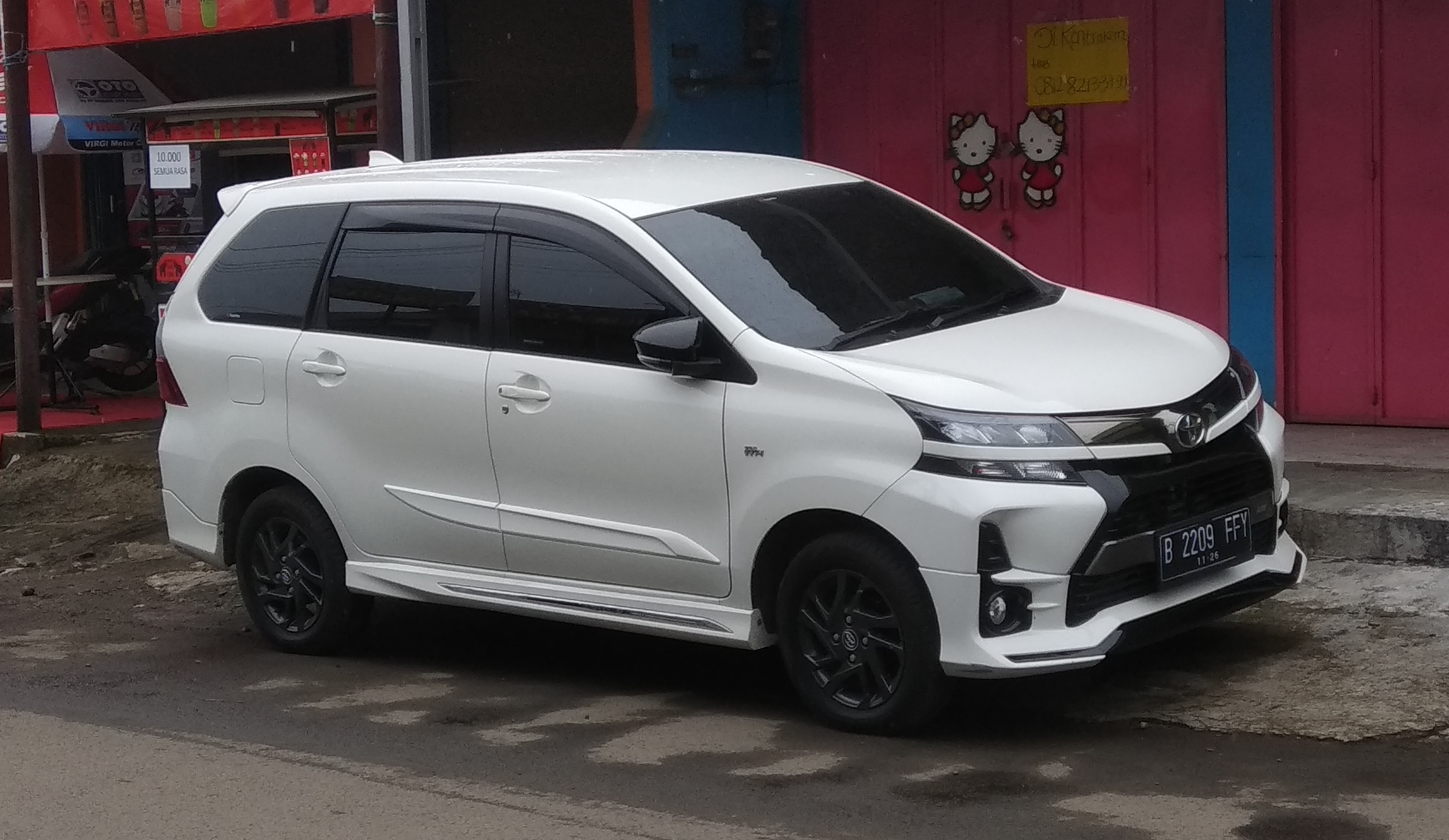
2021 Avanza 1.5 Veloz GR Limited (F654RM, Indonesia)

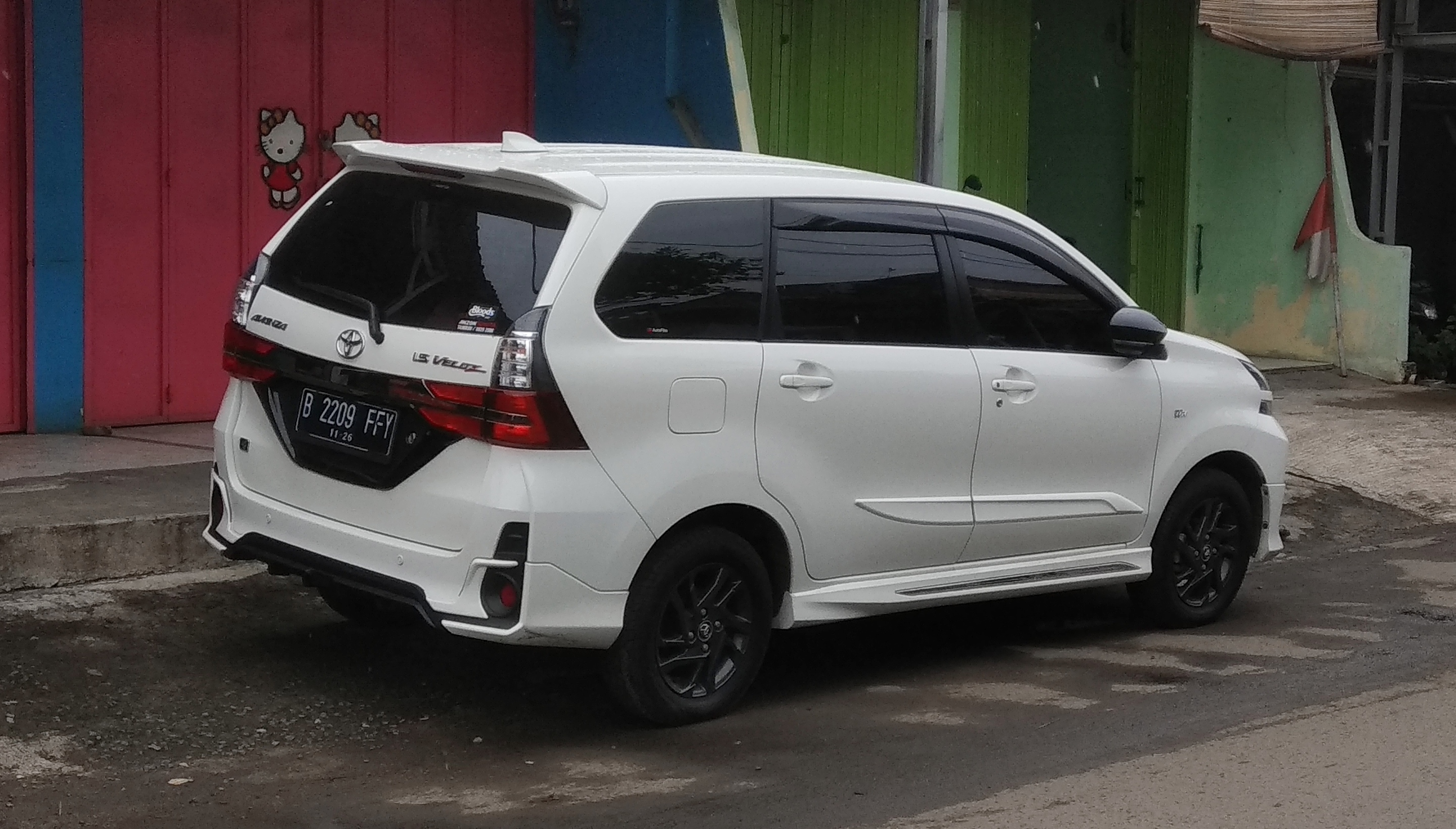
2021 Avanza 1.5 Veloz GR Limited (F654RM, Indonesia)

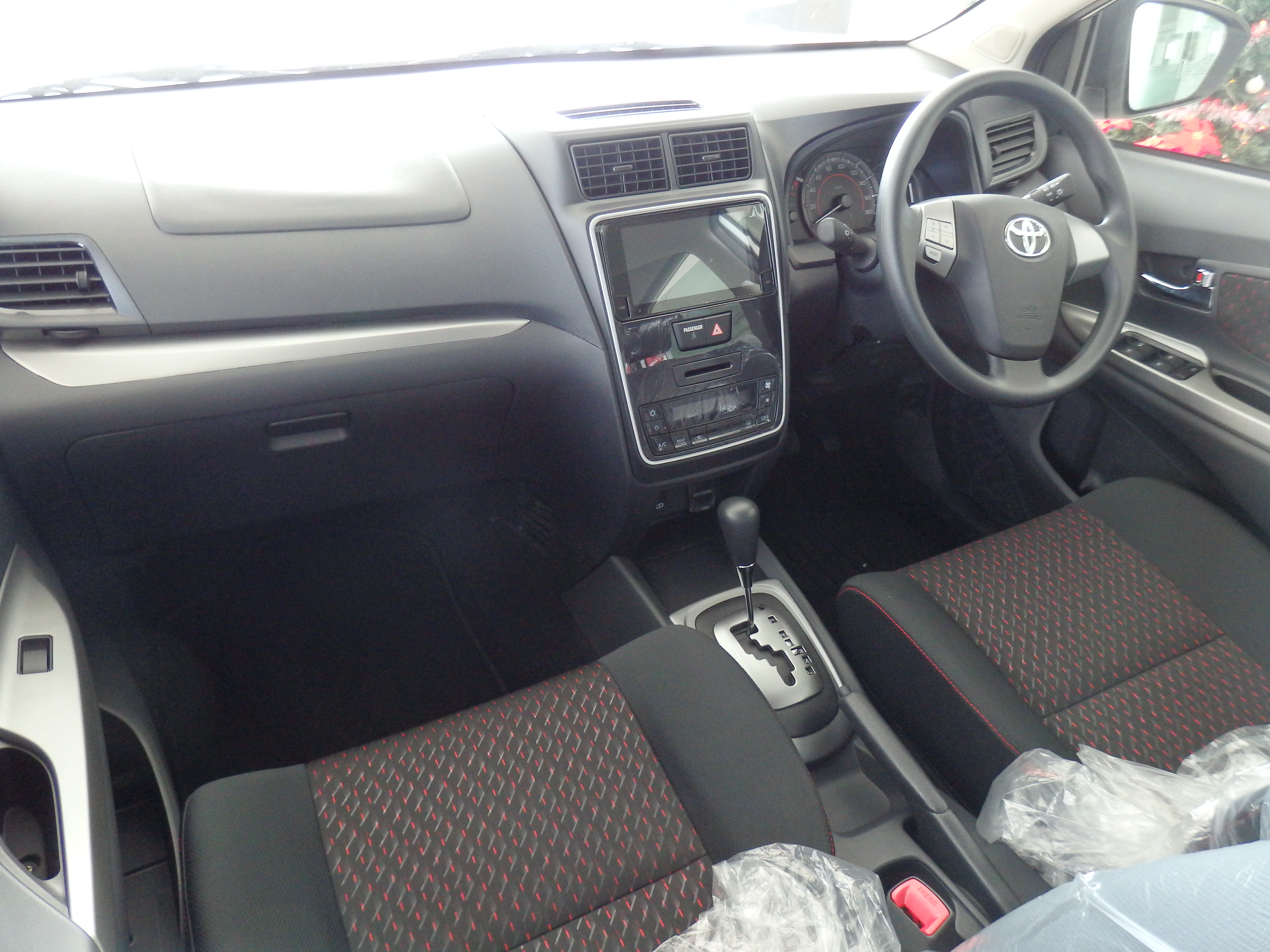
2019 Avanza 1.5 S+ interior (Malaysia)

=== Daihatsu Xenia ===
Alongside the Avanza, Daihatsu also launched the second-generation Xenia on 9 November 2011 for sale in Indonesia only. It remained to serve as a more affordable alternative to the Avanza.

The Xenia was initially available in four different grade levels: 1.0 D, 1.0 M, 1.3 X and 1.3 R. The D, M and X grades came with the 5-speed manual transmission, while the R can have either a 5-speed manual or a 4-speed automatic unit. The D and M grades came powered with a 989 cc EJ-VE three-cylinder engine, while the X and R grades came powered by a 1.3-litre K3-VE four-cylinder unit. Both engines came equipped with Toyota's electronic fuel injection with VVT-i. Like the previous generation, the Xenia had accessories packages that acts as sub-variant, including Plus, Deluxe, Family and Sporty packages. Between 2011 and 2014, a flagship variant called R Attivo was offered. It offered a rugged body kit and the roof rails, giving a crossover-inspired look.

In May 2013, the Xenia was updated along with the Avanza to include improved safety and comfort equipment. Dual SRS airbags and seat belt warning indicator became standard in the lineup.

The Xenia received its first facelift in August 2015. The changes were the same as the Avanza, which consist of an updated fascia, headlights and taillights, and two-tone brown interior colour. The X and R grades received a newer engine, both became powered by a 1.3-litre 1NR-VE Dual VVT-i engine. The 1.0-litre engine option remains unchanged.

In August 2016, the 1.0-litre Xenia models were discontinued in favour of the smaller, front-wheel-drive Sigra.

A crossover-styled variant called the Custom was launched in November 2017, based on the R grade.

In January 2019, the Xenia received its second facelift. Like the Avanza, it consists of an updated front fascia with LED reflector headlights, side mirrors, and rear fascia. Other changes includes digital air conditioner, digital media head unit, auto retractable mirrors and revised suspension tunings. The keyless entry system with push start/stop engine button is not available on the Xenia. Alloy wheels were standard in the lineup. For the first time, the Xenia received a 1.5-litre 2NR-VE Dual VVT-i engine option, exclusive to the R Deluxe variant.

Similar to the Transmover, the base 1.3 X grade with manual transmission is the sole variant of the Xenia sold alongside the third-generation model since November 2021. Production of this model ended in January 2023.

==== Gallery ====
Pre-facelift

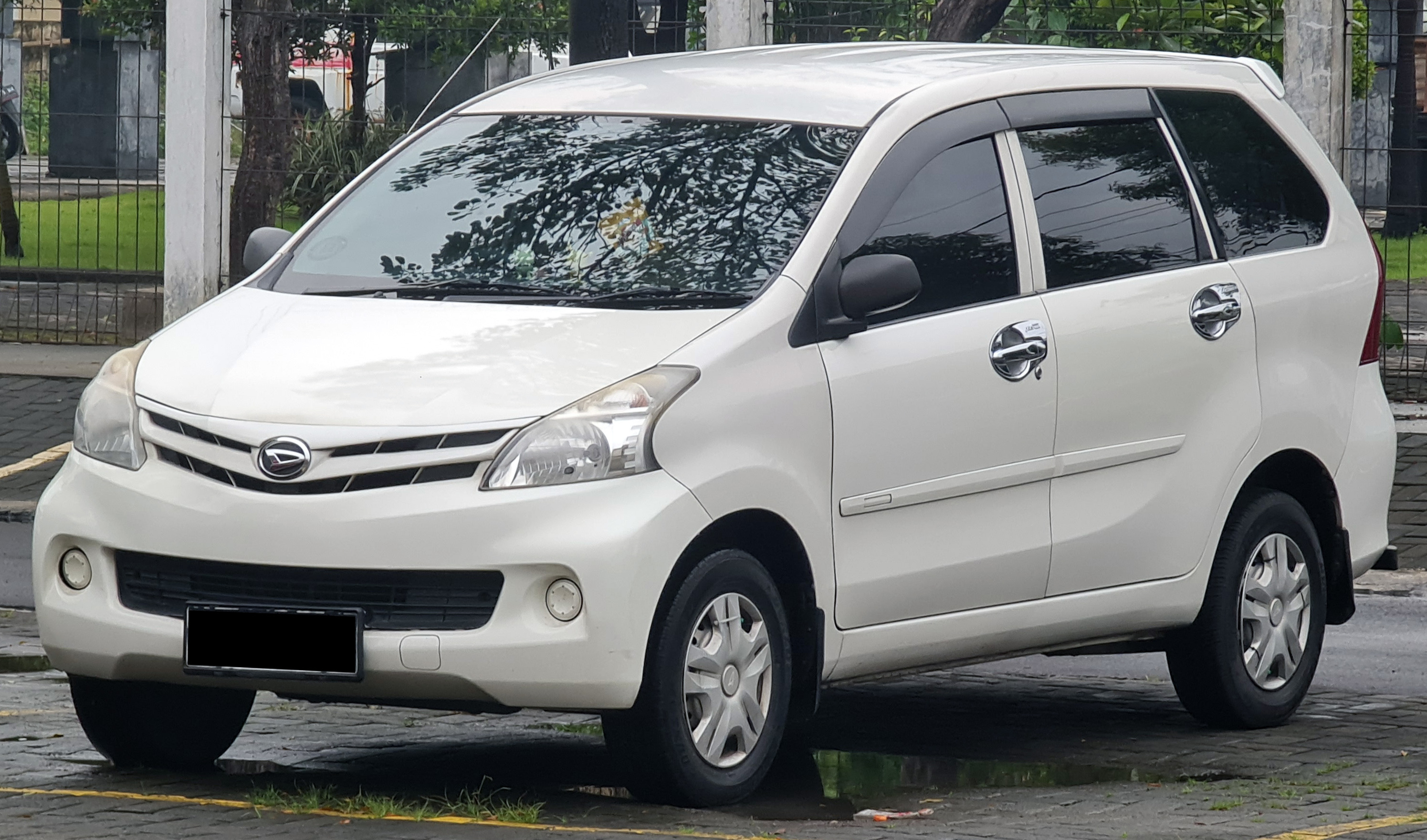
2015 Xenia 1.3 X (F651RV, Indonesia)

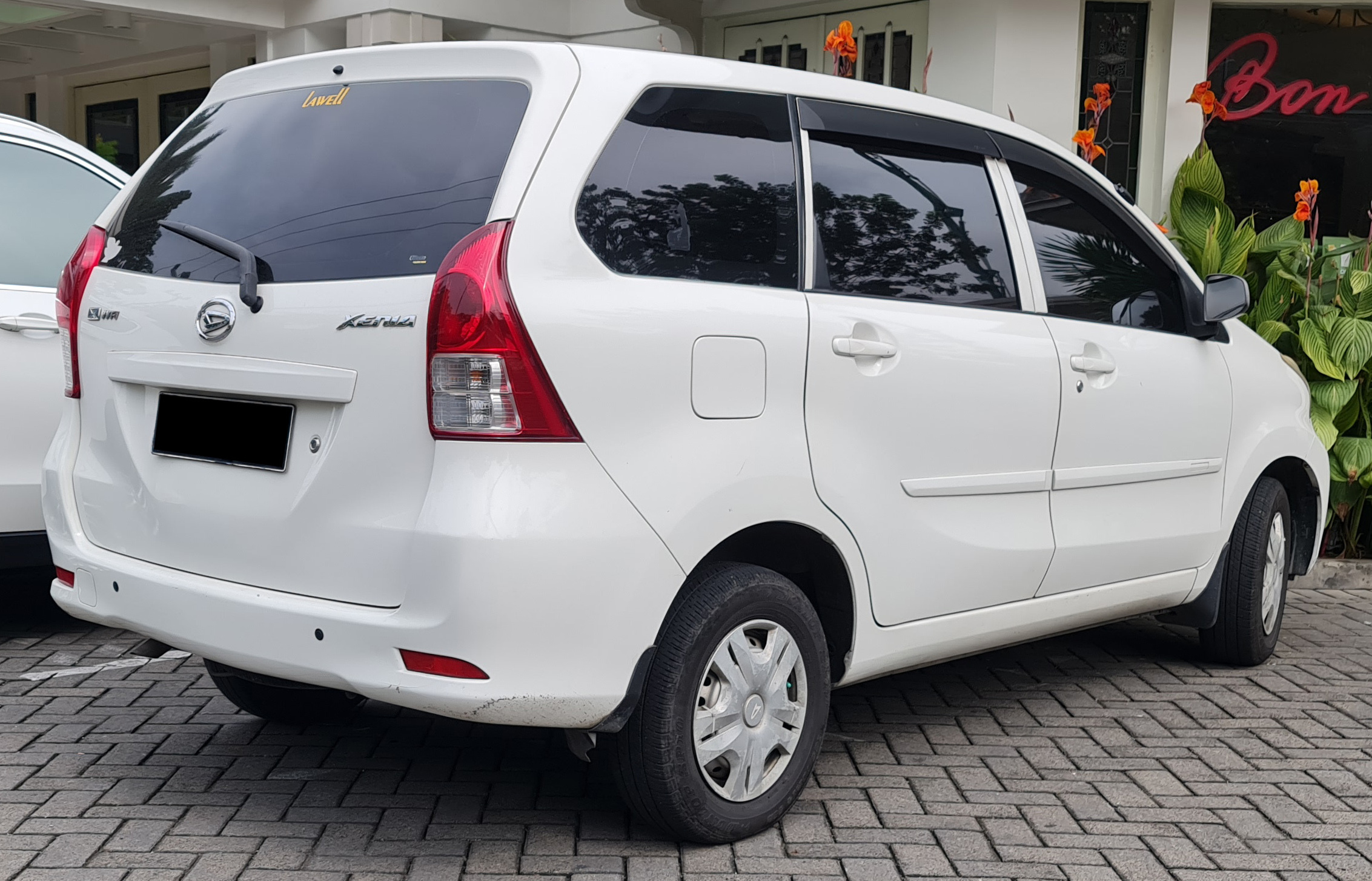
2014 Xenia 1.3 X (F651RV, Indonesia)

First facelift

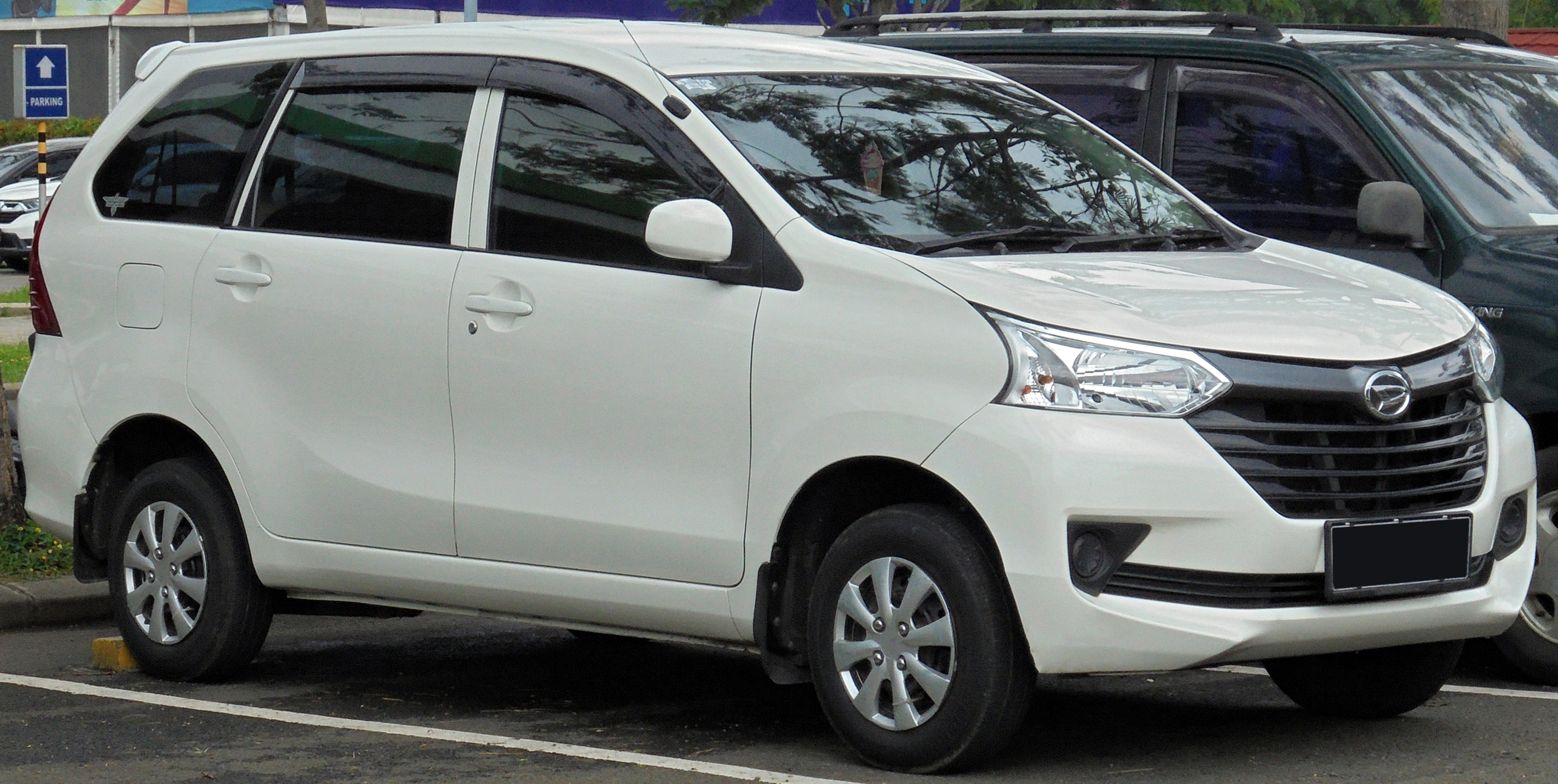
2016 Xenia 1.0 M (F650RV, Indonesia)

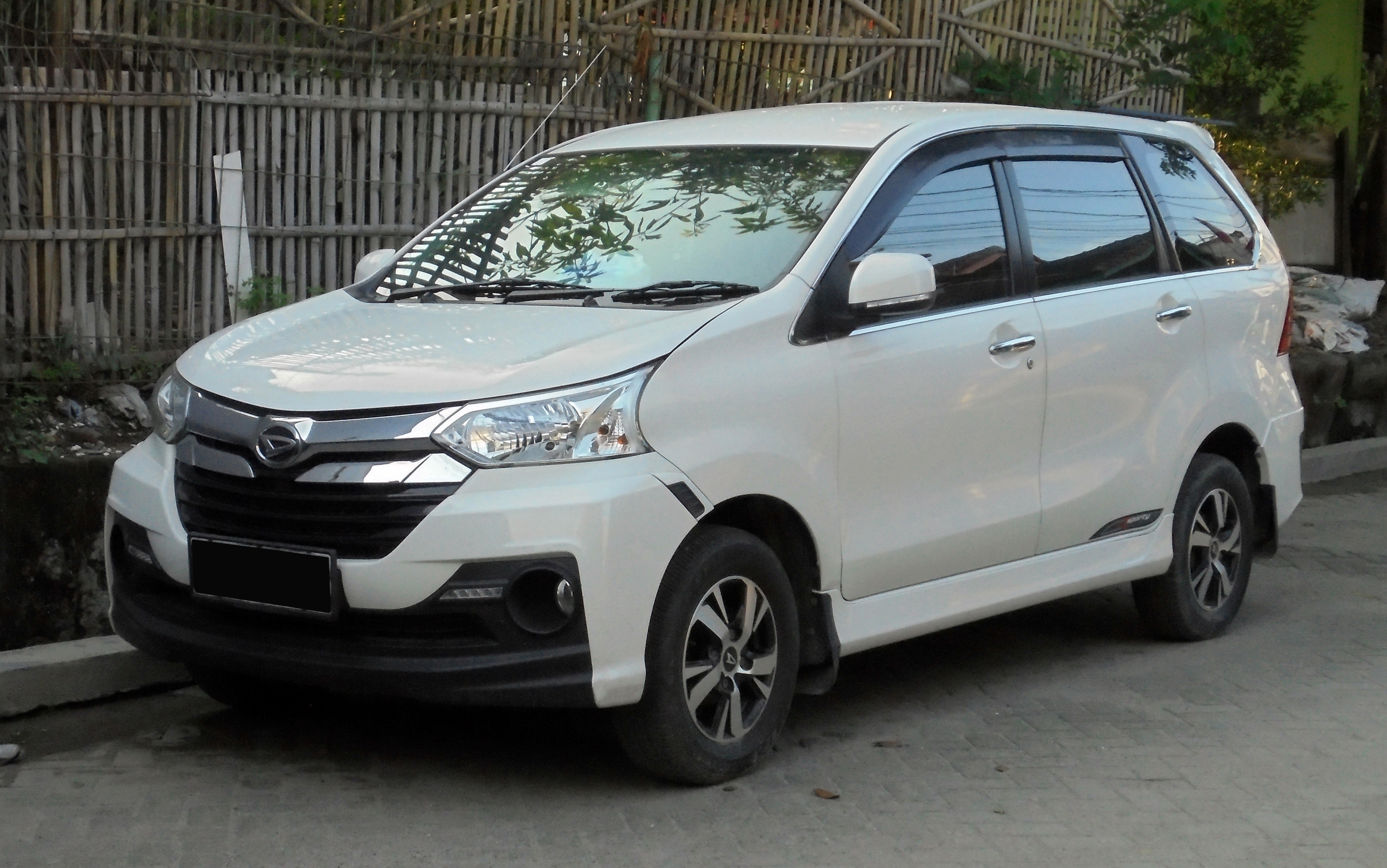
2016 Xenia 1.3 R Sporty (F653RV, Indonesia)

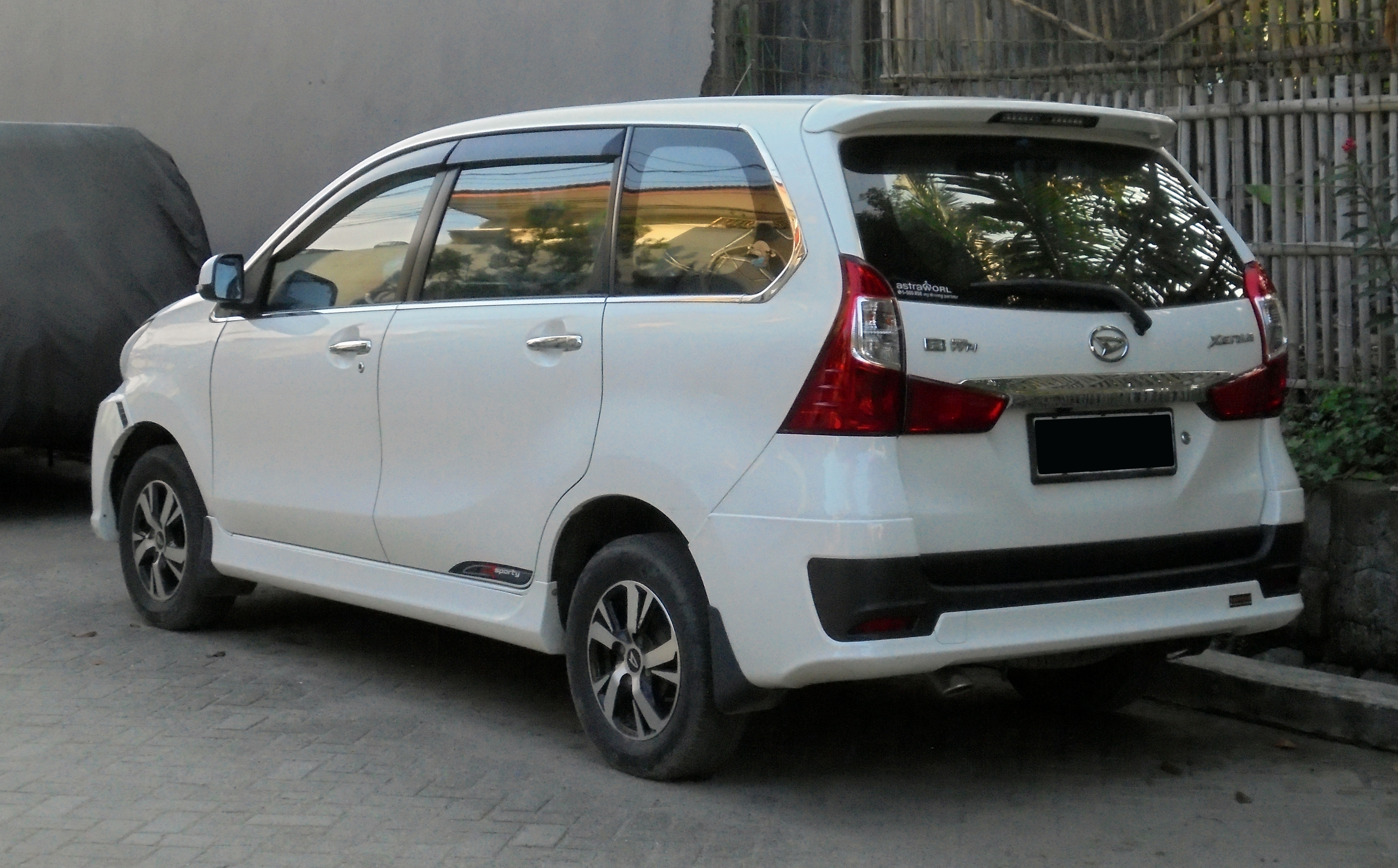
2016 Xenia 1.3 R Sporty (F653RV, Indonesia)

Second facelift

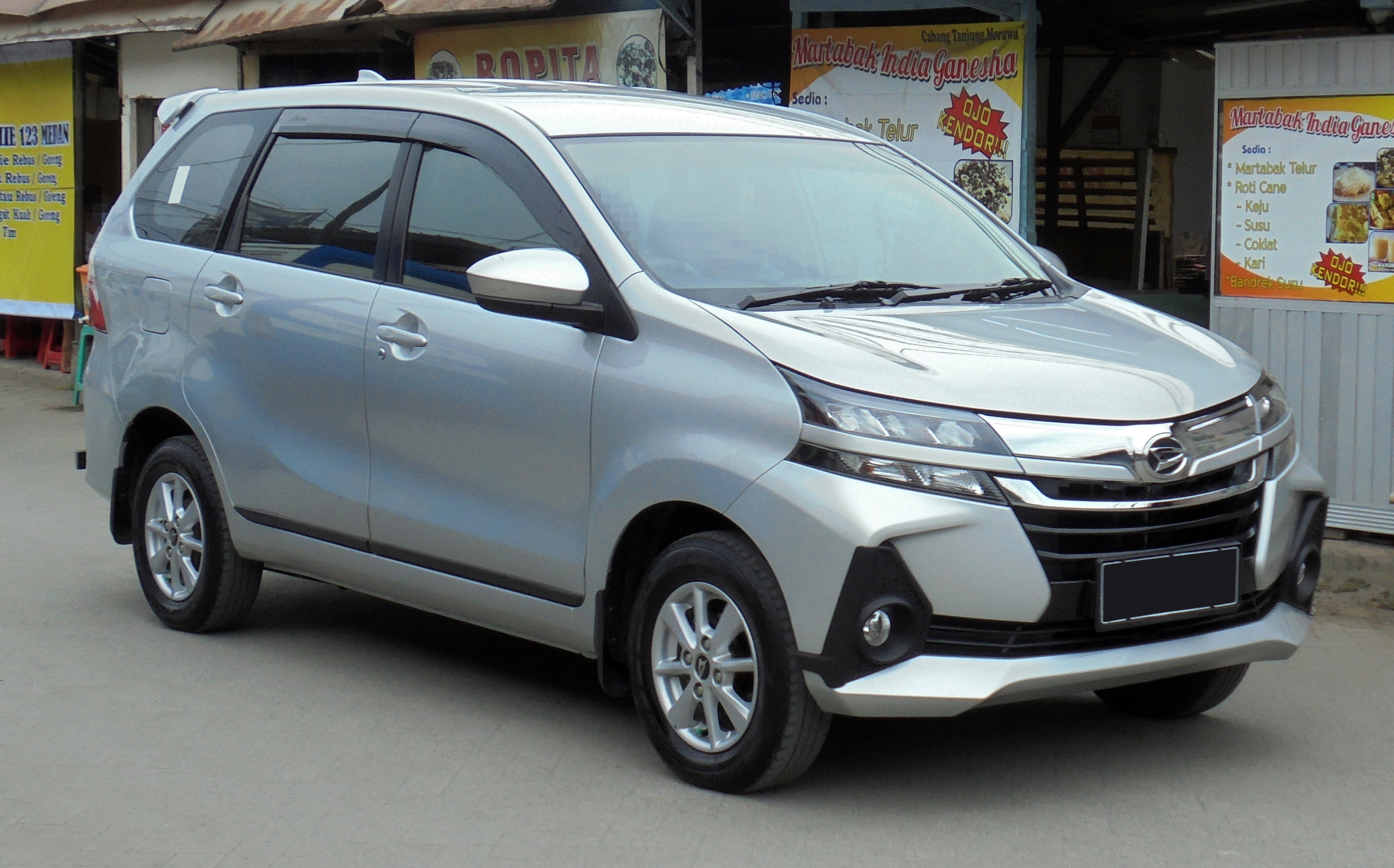
2019 Xenia 1.3 R (F653RV, Indonesia)

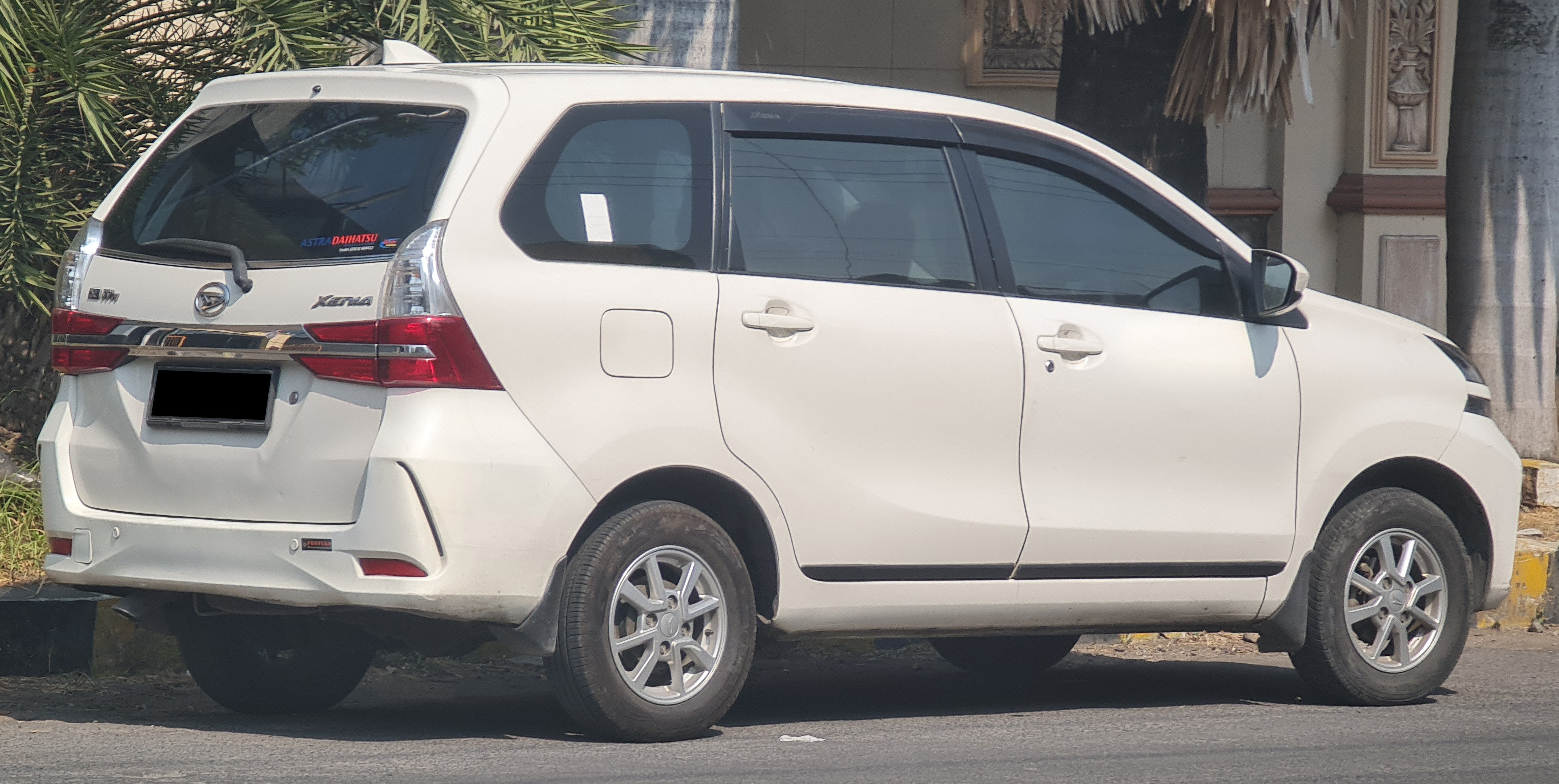
2019 Xenia 1.3 X (F653RV, Indonesia)

=== Safety ===
The African version of the Avanza with no ABS received 4-star safety rating for adult occupants and 2 stars for infants from Global NCAP in 2019.

Global NCAP 1.0 test results (South Africa) Toyota Avanza – 2 Airbags (2019, similar to Latin NCAP 2013)
Test	Score	Stars
Adult occupant protection	11.57/17.00	4 /5 stars
Child occupant protection	19.83/49.00	2 /5 stars

ASEAN NCAP test results Toyota Avanza (2013)
Test	Points	Stars
Adult occupant:	12.98	4 /5 stars
Child occupant:	38%	0 /5 stars
Safety assist:	NA	

ASEAN NCAP test results Toyota Avanza (2013)
Test	Points	Stars
Adult occupant:	12.34	4 /5 stars
Child occupant:	33%	0 /5 stars
Safety assist:	NA	

== Third generation (W100/W150; 2021) ==
Third generation
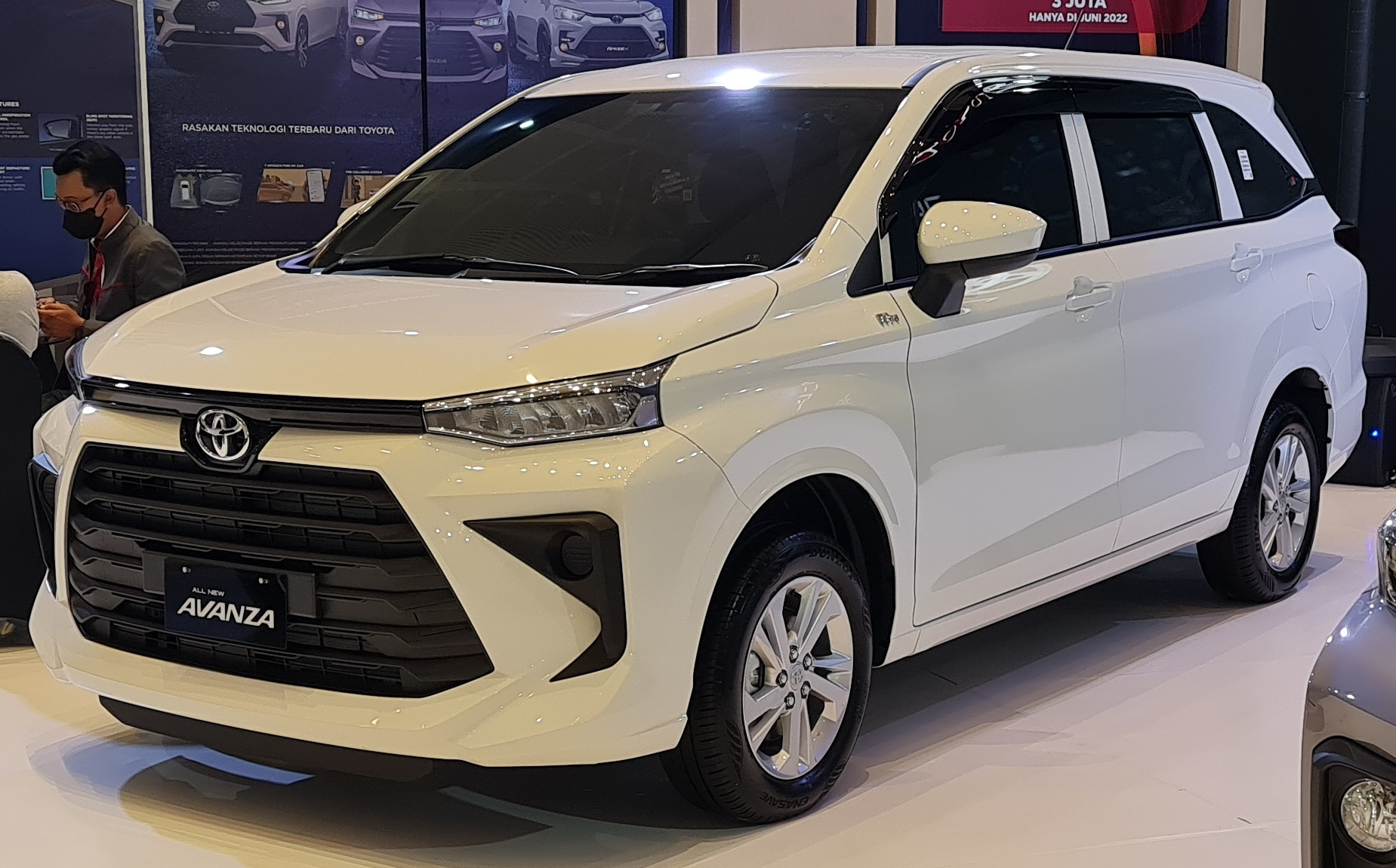
- 2022 Avanza 1.3 E (W100RE, Indonesia)

Overview
- Model code: W100; W150
- Also called: Toyota Veloz; Daihatsu Xenia; Toyota Transmover (2023 – present); Perodua Alza
- Production: November 2021 – present
- Assembly: Indonesia: Sunter, North Jakarta; Karawang, West Java (ADM, Avanza/Xenia); Karawang, West Java (TMMIN, Avanza/Veloz); Malaysia: Rawang, Selangor (Perodua, Alza/Veloz); Vietnam: Phúc Yên (TMV, Avanza/Veloz)
- Designer: List: Jiro Matsueda, Katsutaro Kimura and Koichi Mizuta (all models); Antonius Wibowo, Manabu Fukuda and Zaki Mubarok (Avanza); Hideyu Honda (Veloz); Jendro Trimaryanto and Ryoichi Asaumi (Xenia); Ayumi Kadota and Koji Nagai (interior)

Body and chassis
- Class: Compact MPV
- Layout: Front-engine, front-wheel-drive
- Platform: Daihatsu New Global Architecture: DNGA-B
- Related: Toyota Yaris Cross (AC200); Toyota Vios / Yaris / Yaris Ativ (AC100)

Powertrain
- Engine: Petrol: 1329 cc 1NR-VE I4 (W100); 1496 cc 2NR-VE I4 (W101/W151); Petrol hybrid: 1496 cc 2NR-VEX I4 (W102)
- Power output: 72 kW (98 PS; 97 hp) (1NR-VE); 78 kW (106 PS; 105 hp) (2NR-VE); 82 kW (111 PS; 110 hp) (2NR-VEX, combined system output)
- Transmission: 5-speed manual; CVT with 7-speed manual mode; eCVT (hybrid)
- Hybrid drivetrain: Power-split
- Battery: 0.7 kWh lithium-ion (hybrid)

Dimensions
- Wheelbase: 2,750 mm (108.3 in)
- Length: 4,395 mm (173.0 in); 4,475 mm (176.2 in) (Veloz); 4,425 mm (174.2 in) (Alza)
- Width: 1,730 mm (68.1 in); 1,750 mm (68.9 in) (Veloz)
- Height: 1,665–1,700 mm (65.6–66.9 in); 1,660–1,670 mm (65.4–65.7 in) (Alza)
- Kerb weight: 1,080–1,185 kg (2,381–2,612 lb)

Chronology
- Predecessor: Toyota Passo Sette (Avanza, indirect); Daihatsu Boon Luminas (Xenia, indirect); Perodua Alza (M500) (Alza)

The third-generation Avanza was launched on 10 November 2021. Departing from the previous generations' rear-wheel-drive layout, it is based on the front-wheel drive-based Daihatsu New Global Architecture, riding on a full unibody chassis as opposed to the previous semi-unibody construction. Development was led by Daihatsu chief engineer Eiji Fujibayashi. Its exterior dimensions are longer by 205 mm (8.1 in) and wider by 70 mm (2.8 in), creating a significantly larger footprint compared to the previous generations. The wheelbase has been increased by 95 mm (3.7 in), and the interior space is longer by 160 mm (6.3 in). Despite the longer body, its turning radius only slightly increased to 4.9 m (16.1 ft) and its weight is claimed to decrease by around 45 kg (99 lb).

The 1.3-litre 1NR-VE and the 1.5-litre 2NR-VE engines received upgrades which increased their outputs by 1.5 kW (2.0 PS). A split-gear CVT system called the "Dual-Mode CVT" (D-CVT) developed by Daihatsu has been adopted for automatic transmission models.

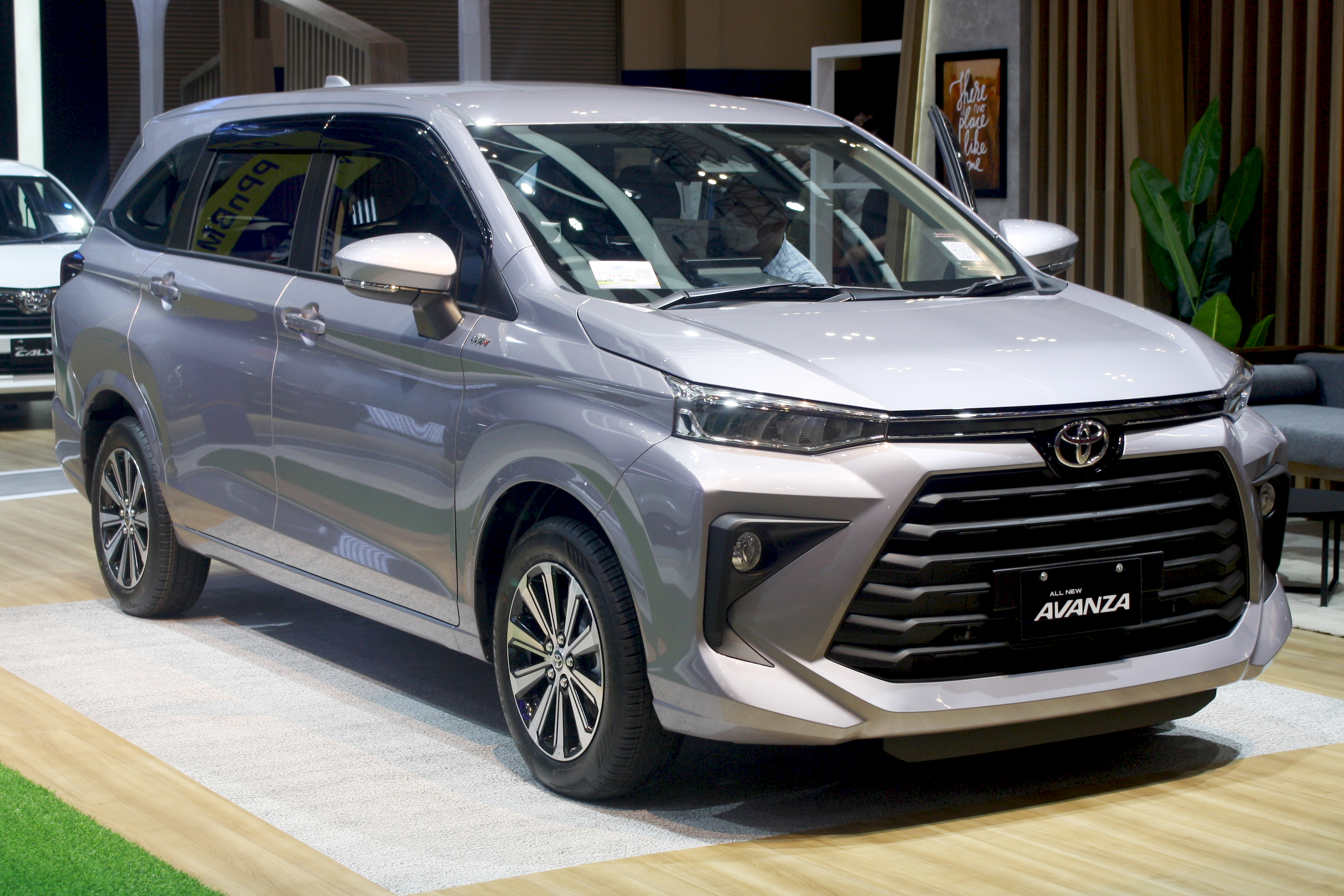
2021 Avanza 1.5 G TSS (W101RE, Indonesia)

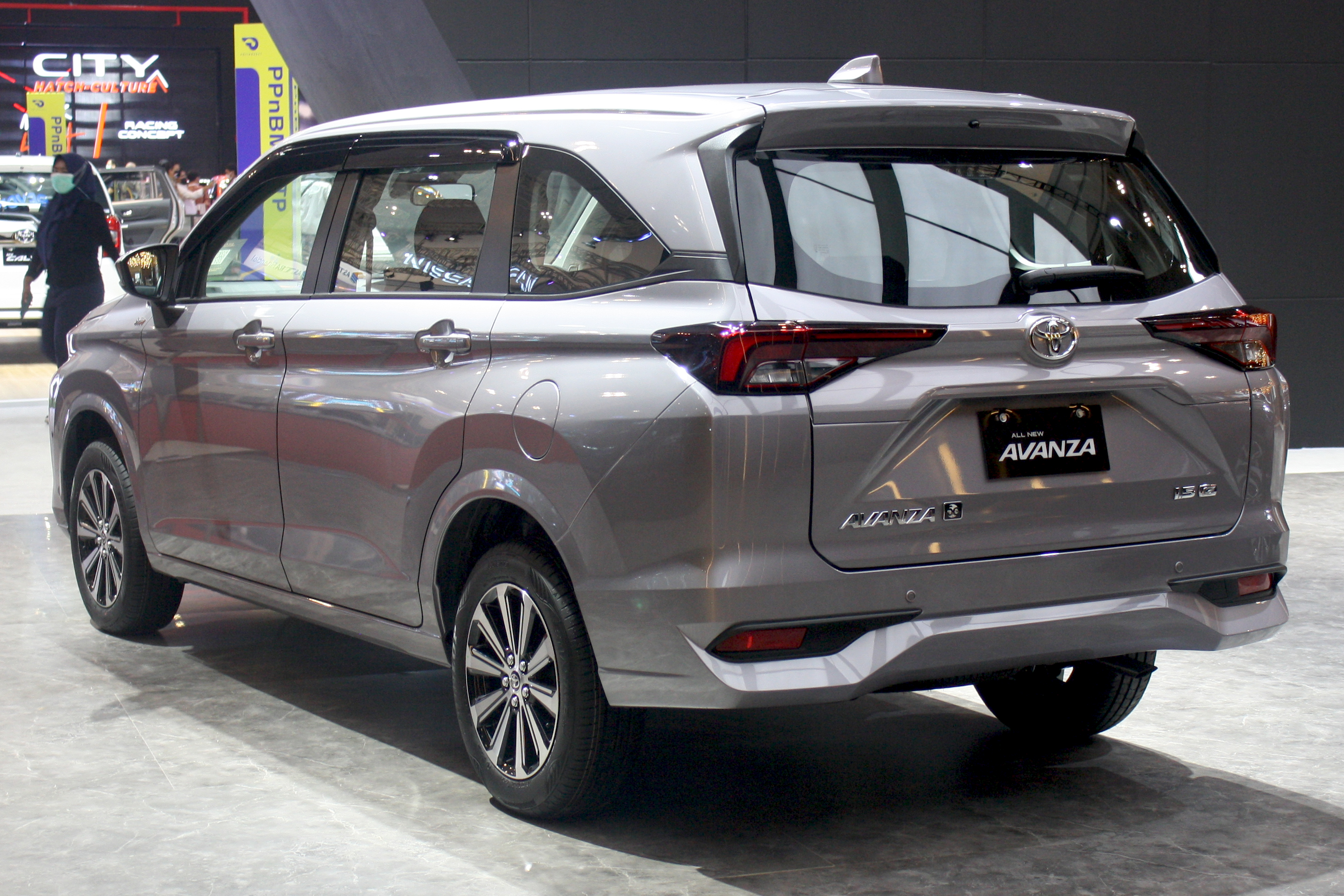
2021 Avanza 1.5 G TSS (W101RE, Indonesia)

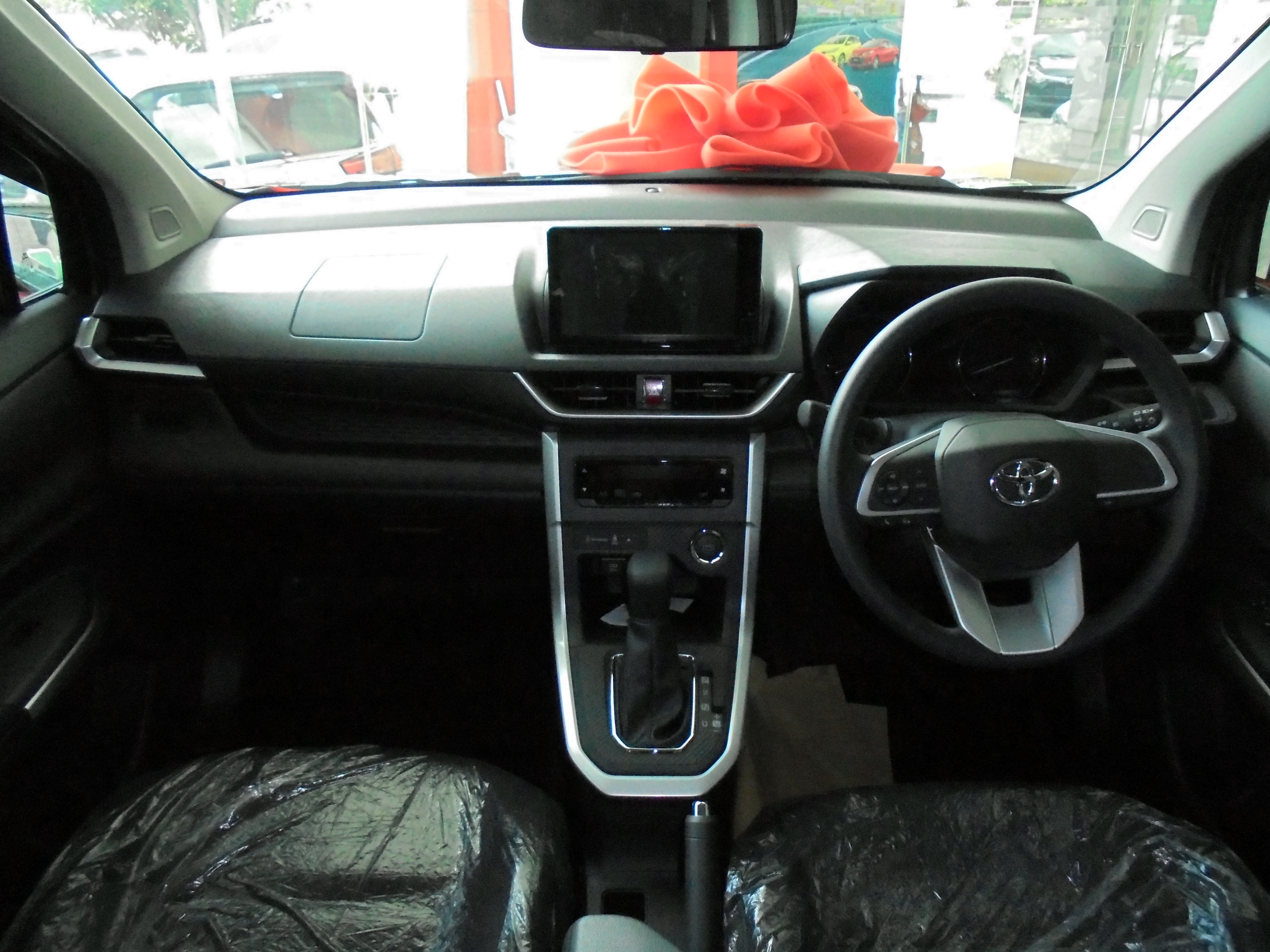
Interior

=== Markets ===
==== Americas ====
===== Costa Rica =====
For the Costa Rica market, Avanza was launched on 26 July 2022, it is offered solely in High Line trim, powered by a 1.5-litre 2NR-VE engine, with CVT as standard.

===== Mexico =====
The third-generation Avanza was released in Mexico on 14 March 2022. Powered by the 1.5-litre 2NR-VE engine as standard powertrain, it is offered in LE (manual only) and XLE (CVT only) grade levels.

===== Peru =====
The third generation Toyota Avanza was launched in Peru in June 2022, with 4 variants available, powered by a 1.5-litre 2NR-VE engine, options between a 5-speed manual or CVT.

==== Asia ====
===== Bangladesh =====
The Bangladesh market Avanza was launched together with the Veloz and Raize on 5 June 2022, it is offered in a sole variant, powered by a 1.5-litre 2NR-VE engine, with CVT as standard.

===== Indonesia =====
For the Indonesian market, grade levels for the Avanza consists of 1.3 E and 1.5 G, both available with either a manual transmission or CVT. Until September 2023, the 1.5 G grade with CVT transmission was also available with advanced driver-assistance systems package and 6 SRS Airbags branded as Toyota Safety Sense as an option.

===== Philippines =====
The third-generation Avanza was launched in the Philippines on 7 March 2022 and is offered in 1.3 J (manual only), 1.3 E (manual and CVT), and 1.5 G (CVT only) grade levels.

===== Vietnam =====
The Vietnamese model was launched on 22 March 2022 and is marketed as the Avanza Premio to distinguish it from the previous generation. Exclusively available with the 1.5-litre 2NR-VE engine, it is offered with two transmission options: manual and CVT. The latter is equipped with six airbags, Blind Spot Monitoring (BSM) and Rear Cross Traffic Alert (RCTA).

=== Toyota Veloz ===
The Veloz flagship grade level from the previous generation Avanza for some markets was spun off into a separate nameplate as the Toyota Veloz, which is marketed as an upscale alternative to the Avanza. The front fascia has been redesigned to distinguish itself from the Avanza, gaining a redesigned bumper, front hood, front and rear quarter panels, and the addition of faux roof rails, creating a crossover-inspired look. The rear end is differentiated by the integrated taillight design and a distinct bumper design. It is wider by 20 mm (0.79 in) compared to the Avanza due to the inclusion of aero kits and side claddings. The model is also equipped with rear disc brakes, an electronic parking brake with brake hold, wireless charging pad, blue ambient lighting, a digital instrument cluster with 7-inch information display, along with other equipment. The 1.5-litre 2NR-VE engine is standard.

First assembled at the Toyota Motor Manufacturing Indonesia Plant 2 in Karawang, West Java, separated from the Avanza, it has also been assembled by Perodua in Rawang, Selangor, Malaysia since 2022 to be sold locally and in Vietnam since November 2022 alongside the Avanza Premio.

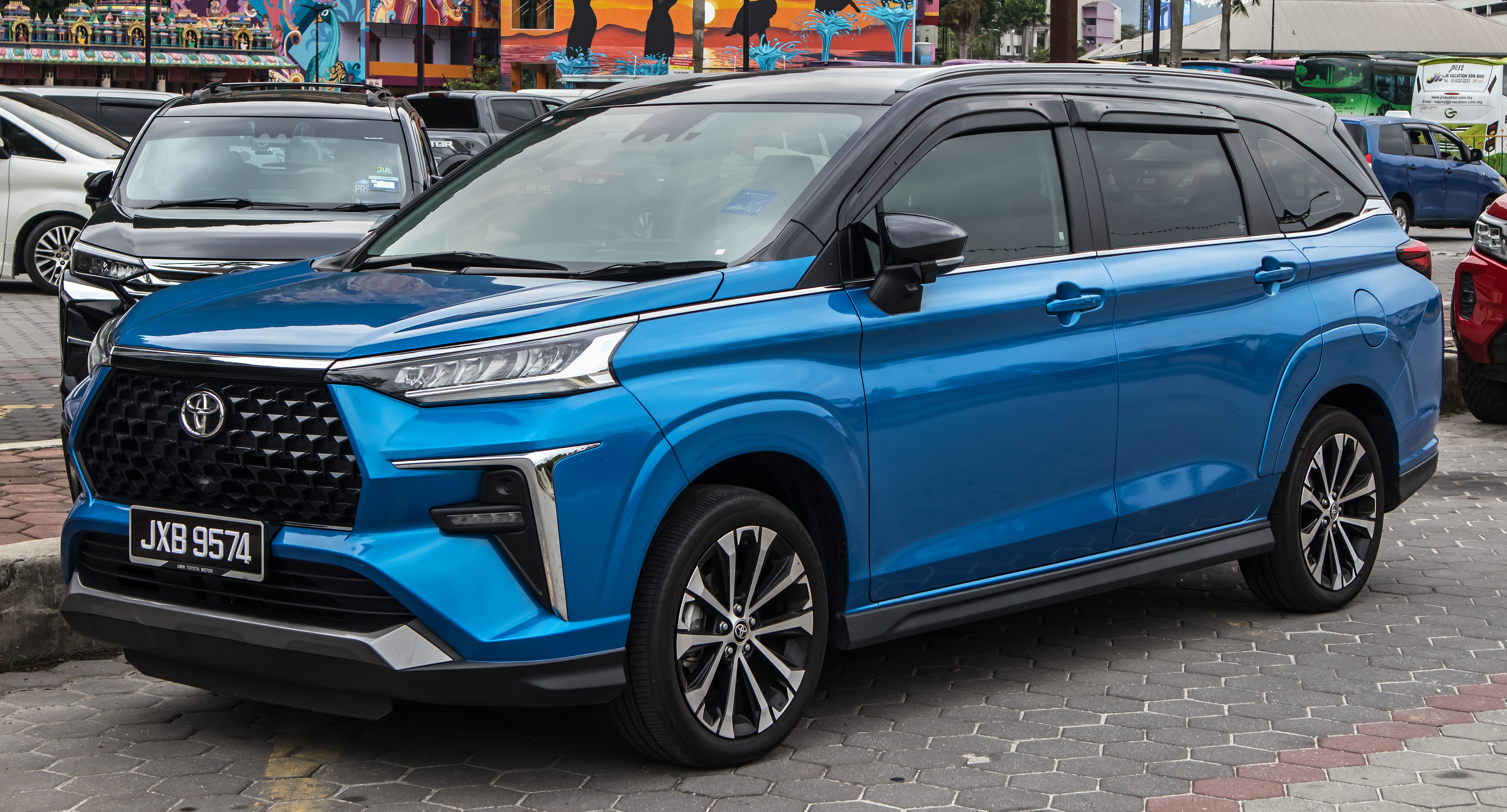
Toyota Veloz (W151RE, Malaysia)

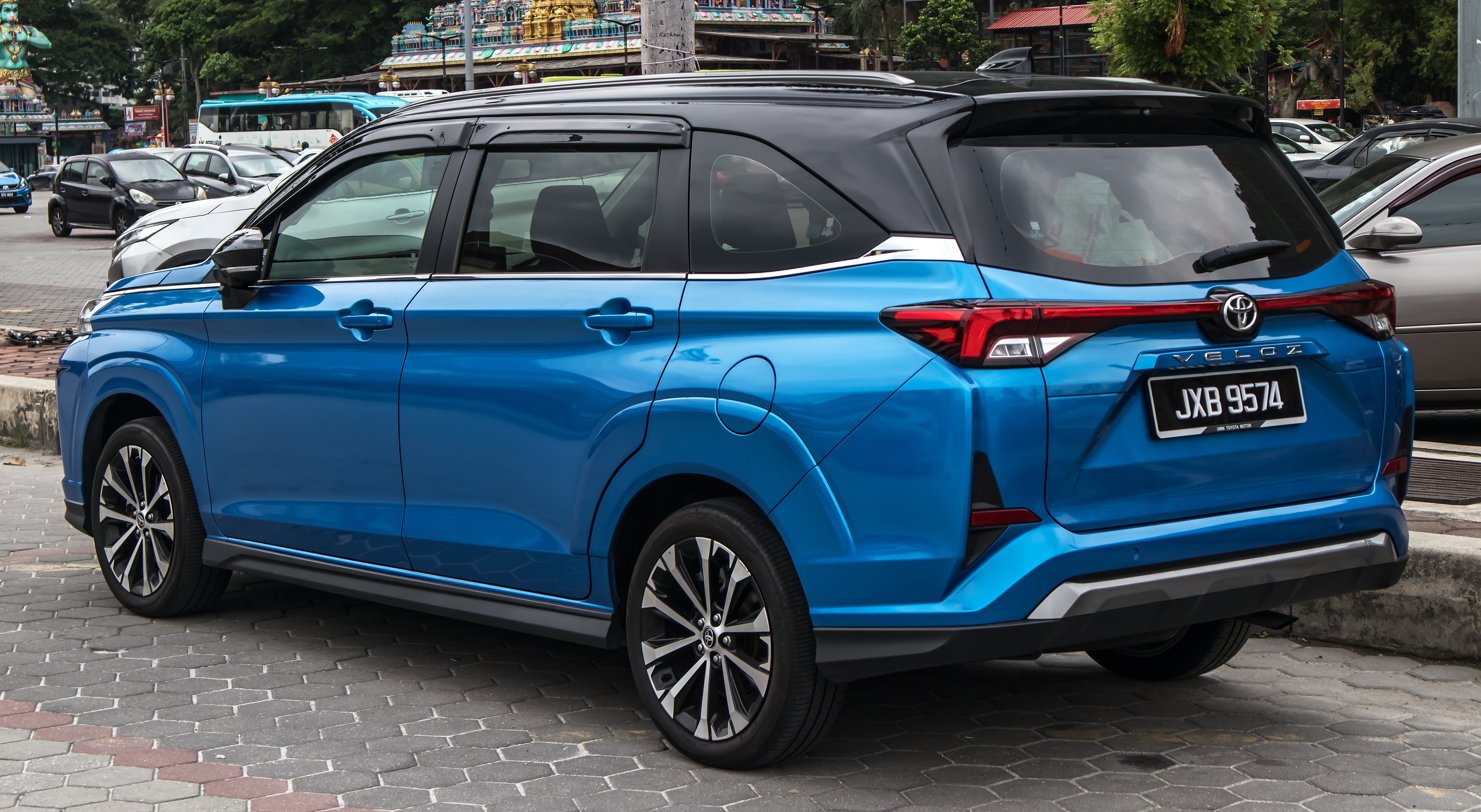
Rear view

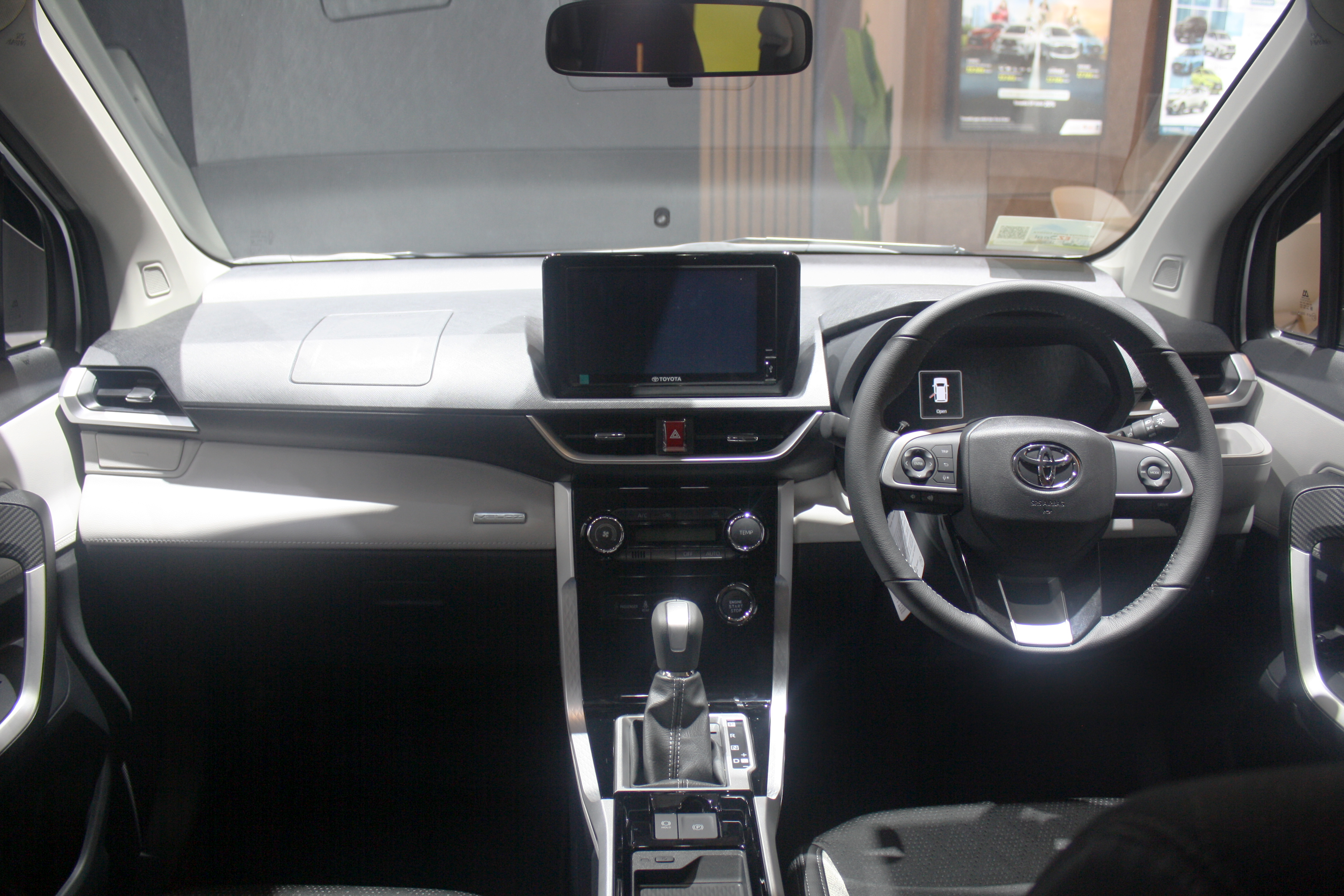
Interior

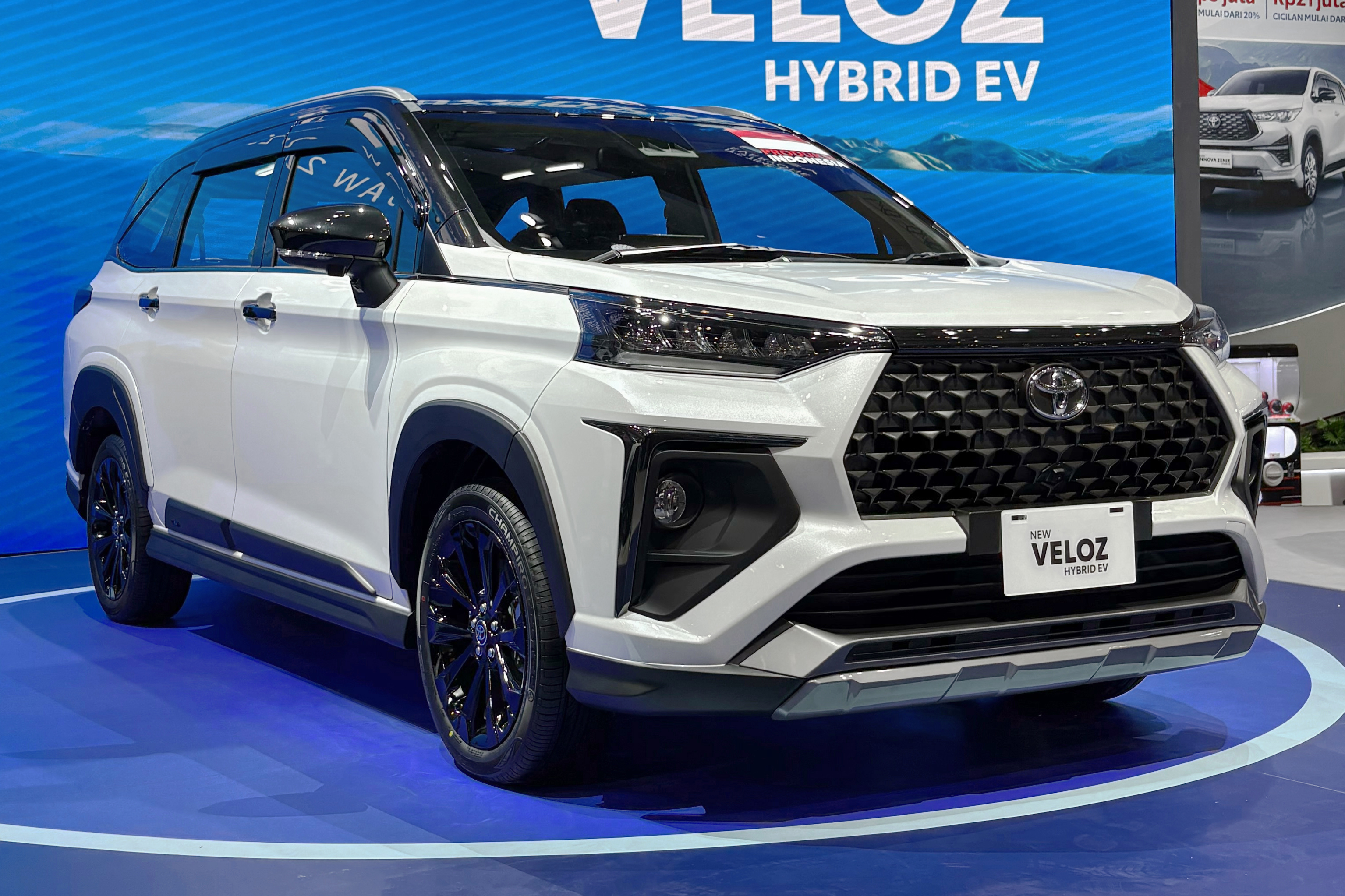
2025 Veloz Hybrid, with Modellista Aerokit package (W102RE, Indonesia)

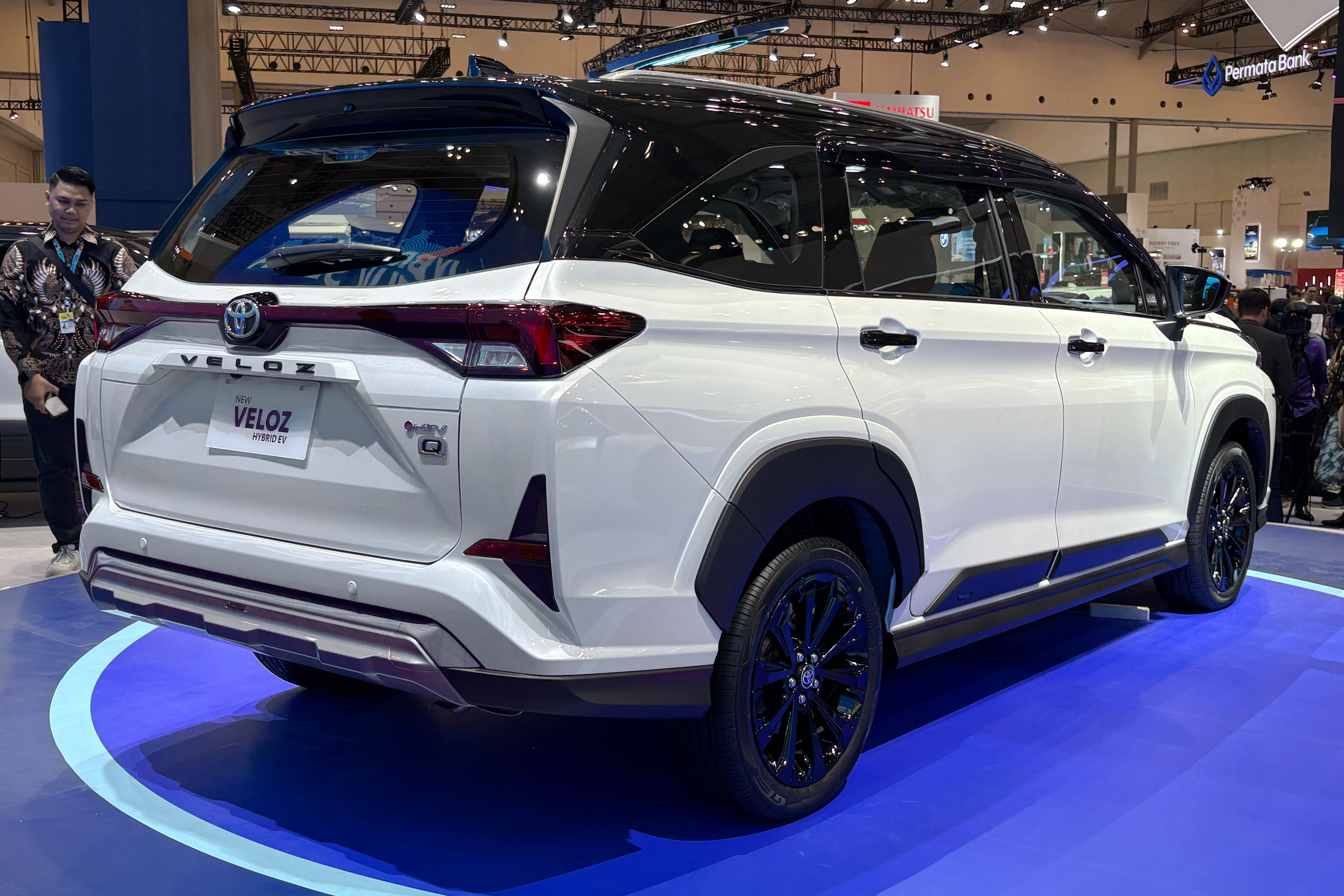
Rear view

==== Markets ====
===== Bangladesh =====
The Bangladesh market Veloz was launched together with the Avanza and Raize on 5 June 2022, it is offered in a sole variant, powered by a 1.5-litre 2NR-VE engine, with CVT as standard.

===== Brunei =====
The Bruneian market Veloz was introduced on 24 March 2022. It is offered only in 1.5 Q grade, with CVT as standard.

===== GCC =====
The Veloz for GCC markets was launched in UAE on 5 February 2023, which replaced the F650 series Avanza. Locally positioned as an "SUV", it is offered in sole GX grade level, with CVT and Toyota Safety Sense as standard.

===== Indonesia =====
Grade levels of the Veloz in Indonesia consists of base (manual and CVT) and 1.5 Q (CVT only), with an optional Toyota Safety Sense package for the latter.

The Hybrid model was launched on 21 November 2025 at the 2025 Gaikindo Jakarta Auto Week, as the third hybrid vehicle to be produced by Toyota in the country, in V (replacing base grade) and Q grade levels. The Modellista accessories package is also offered as an option for the Q grade. the CVT transmission is standard for all models. With official sales of Veloz Hybrid in February 2026, non-Hybrid Veloz production for Indonesian market and manual transmission was discontinued.

===== Malaysia =====
The Malaysian market Veloz was introduced on 18 October 2022, which replaced the F650 series Avanza. It is assembled at the Perodua plant in Rawang, Selangor. The model is equipped with daytime running lights instead of front halogen fog lights. Available in a single grade, Toyota Safety Sense (with additional adaptive cruise control) is standard.

===== Philippines =====
The Philippine market Veloz was introduced on 29 April 2022. Locally positioned as a "subcompact SUV", it is offered in 1.5 G and 1.5 V grade levels, with CVT as standard. Toyota Safety Sense is standard for the 1.5 V grade. In September 2023, the base E CVT grade was added to the lineup, it has features similar to the 1.5 G grade but smaller 16-inch wheels taken from the 1.5 G grade of the Avanza.

===== Thailand =====
The Thai market Veloz was launched on 24 February 2022, which replaced the F650 series Avanza. It is offered in Smart and Premium grade levels, with CVT as standard. Toyota Safety Sense is standard for the Premium grade.

===== Vietnam =====
The Vietnamese model was launched on 22 March 2022 and is marketed as the Veloz Cross. It is offered in base and Top grade levels, with CVT as standard. Toyota Safety Sense is standard for the Top grade.

=== Daihatsu Xenia ===
The third-generation Xenia was launched at the 28th Gaikindo Indonesia International Auto Show on 11 November 2021. Contrary to the previous generations, the Xenia received a differentiated front fascia. Grade levels available are 1.3 M, 1.3 X, 1.3 R, and 1.5 R.

Astra Daihatsu Styling (ADS) package with aero kits and other accessories is available for the R grade, while the flagship 1.5 R is available with optional advanced driver-assistance systems package branded as Advanced Safety Assist (ASA). The ADS package was updated on 24 July 2024, with additional two-tone colour, body kit, and chrome accents on the front and rear bumper garnishes..

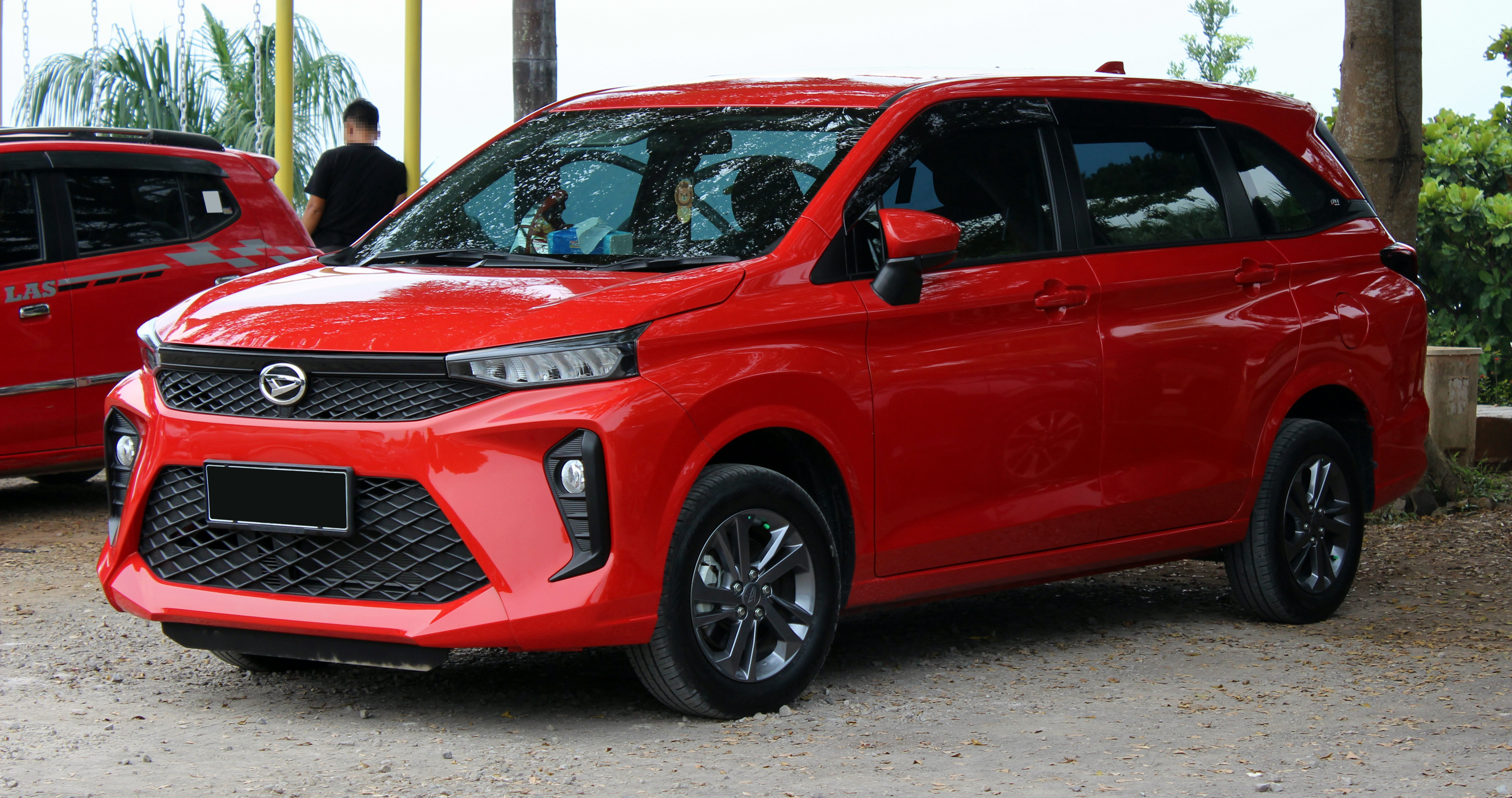
2022 Xenia 1.3 R (W100RG, Indonesia)

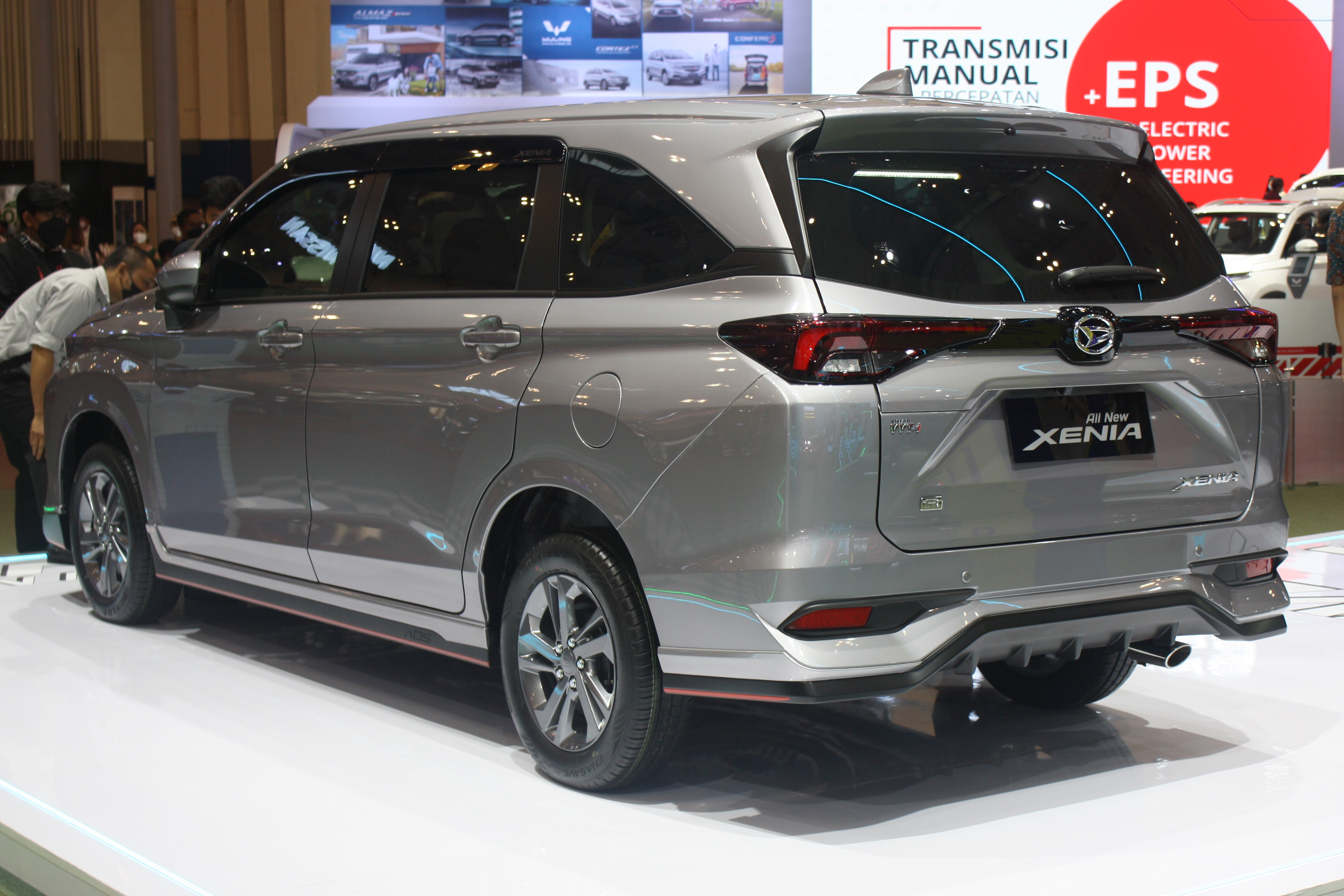
2021 Xenia 1.3 R ADS Package (W100RG, Indonesia)

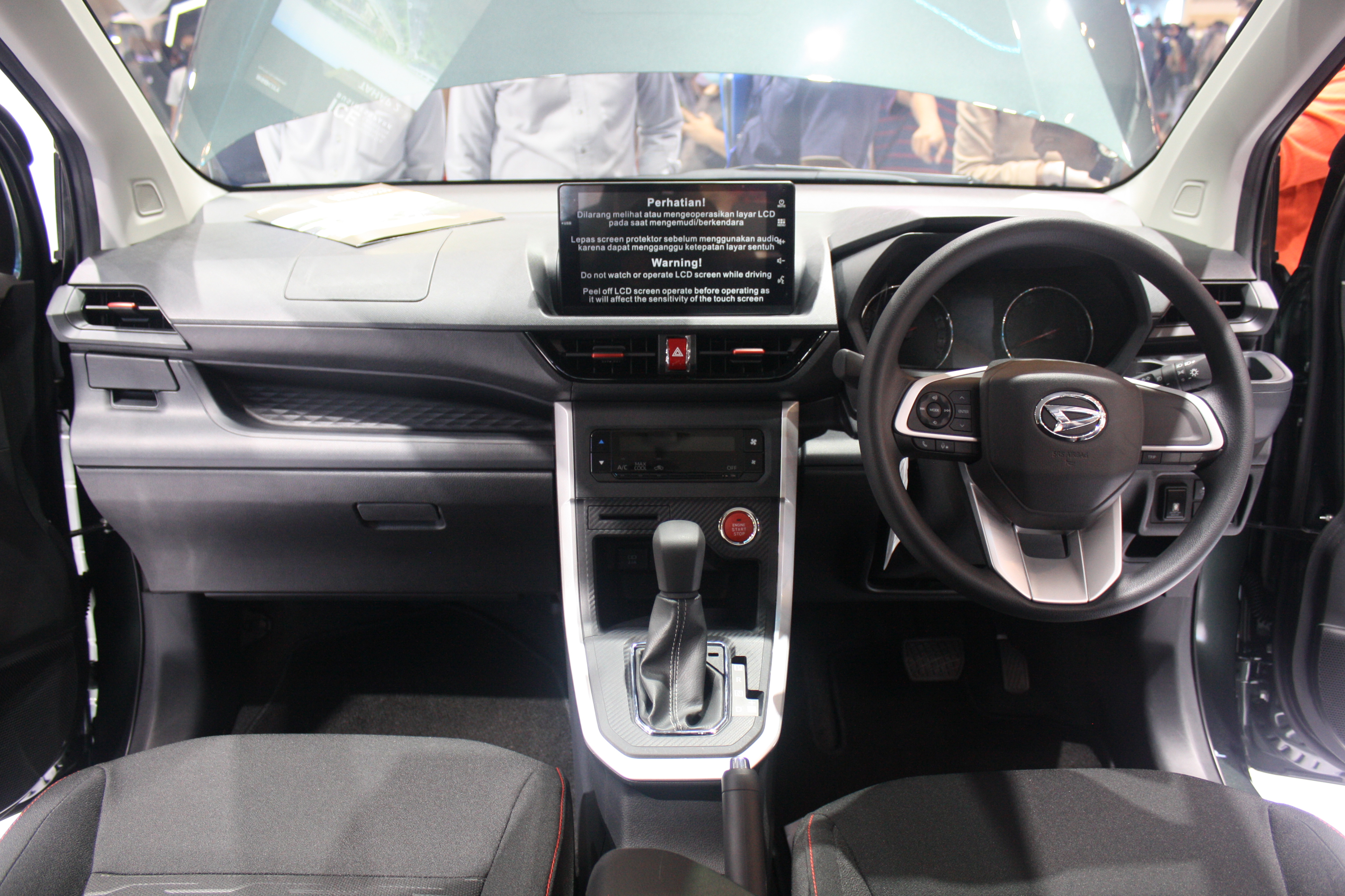
Interior

=== Perodua Alza (W151RG) ===
The Avanza-based second-generation Perodua Alza was introduced on 20 July 2022. It is offered in X, H, and AV grade levels with the 1.5-litre 2NR-VE engine with D-CVT as the sole powertrain option. ASA 3.0 advanced driver-assistance systems package is standard on all grades. The model received a lower and more driver-oriented suspension settings, which made the Alza sit lower than the Avanza by 45 mm (1.8 in) with a ground clearance of 160 mm (6.3 in). It is assembled at the Perodua plant alongside the Malaysian market Veloz.

The second generation Alza has been launched in Brunei on 3 May 2024. It was offered in H and AV variants.

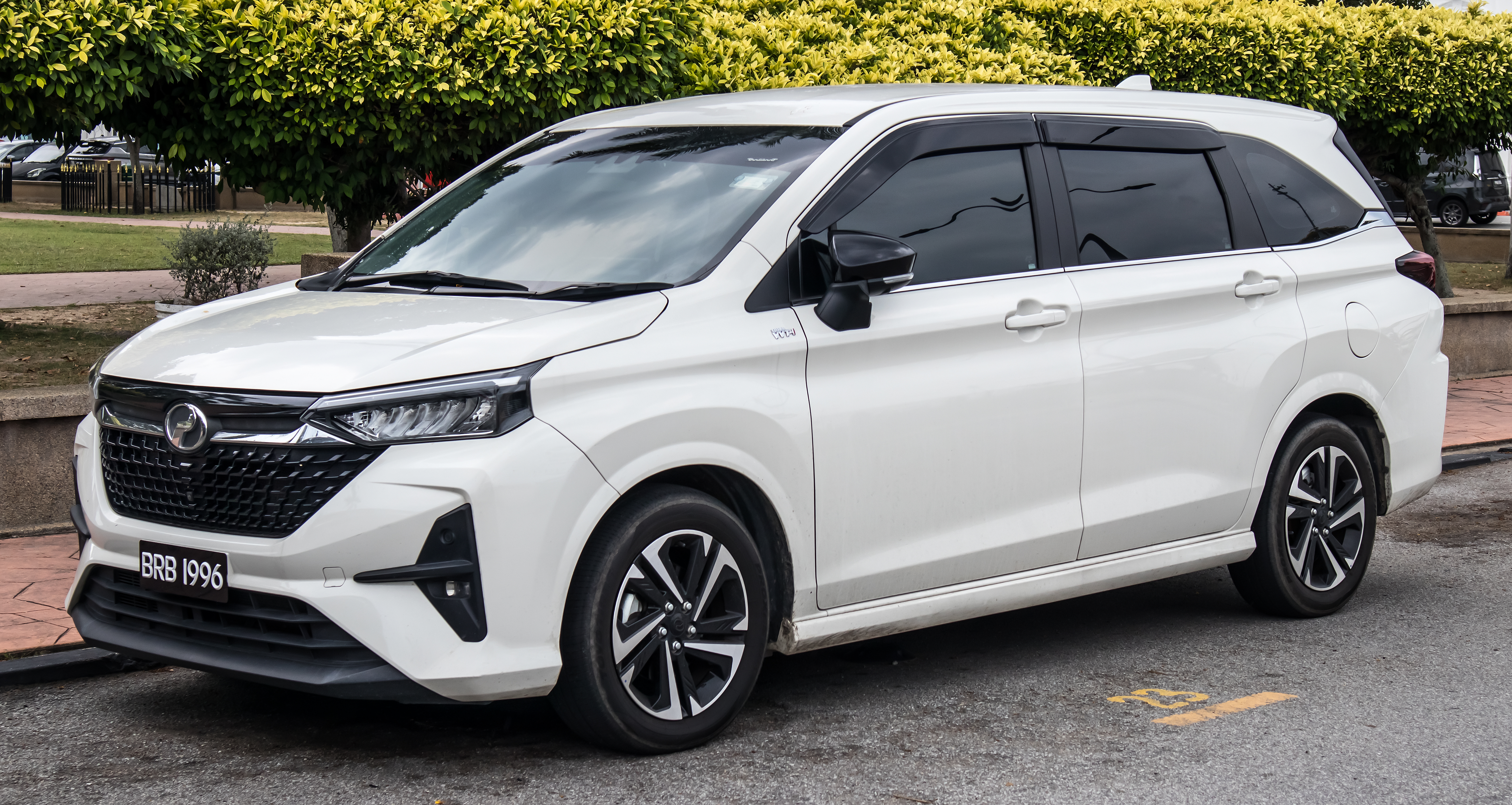
Perodua Alza AV (W151RG, Malaysia)

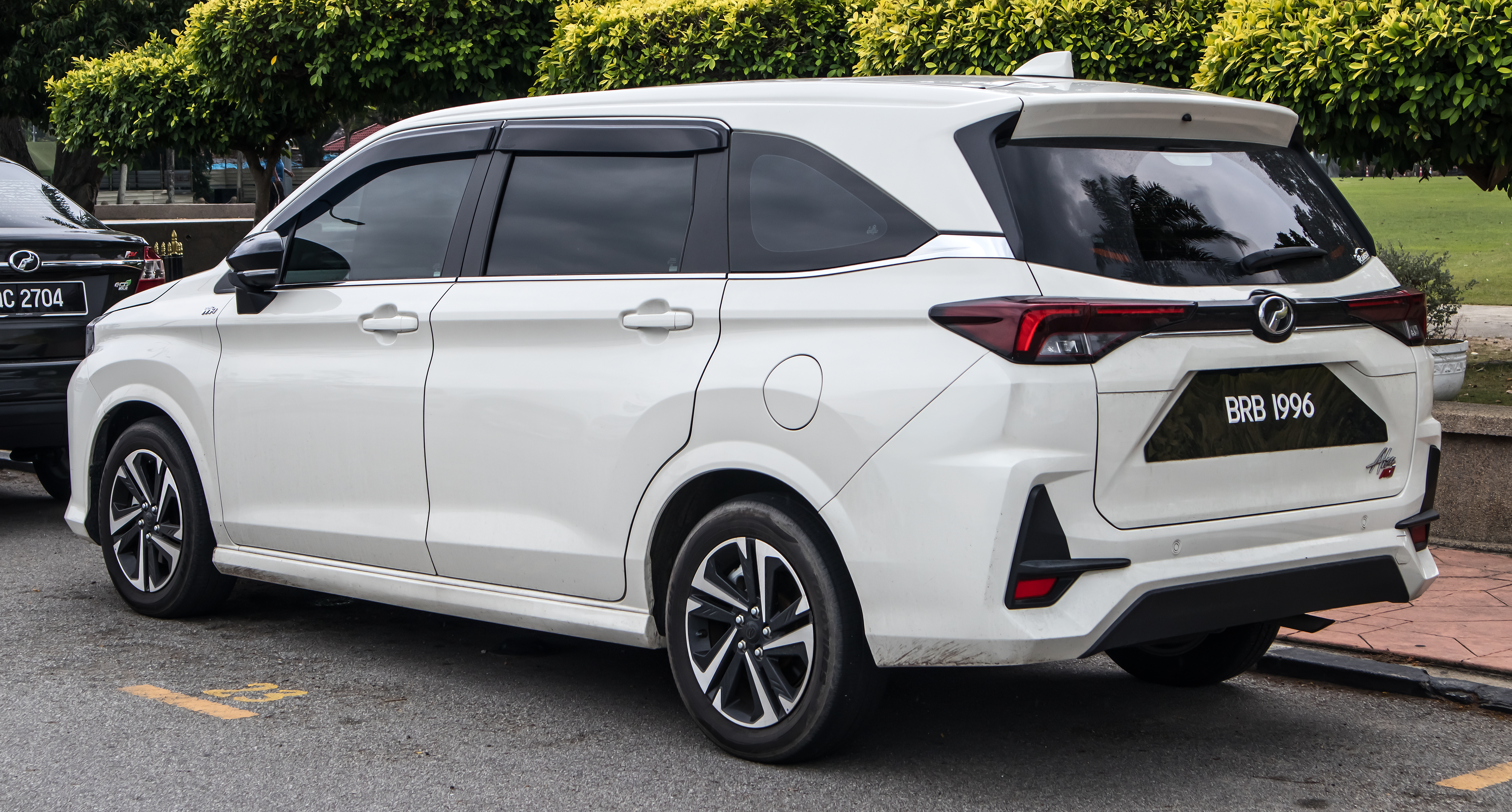
Perodua Alza AV (Rear view)

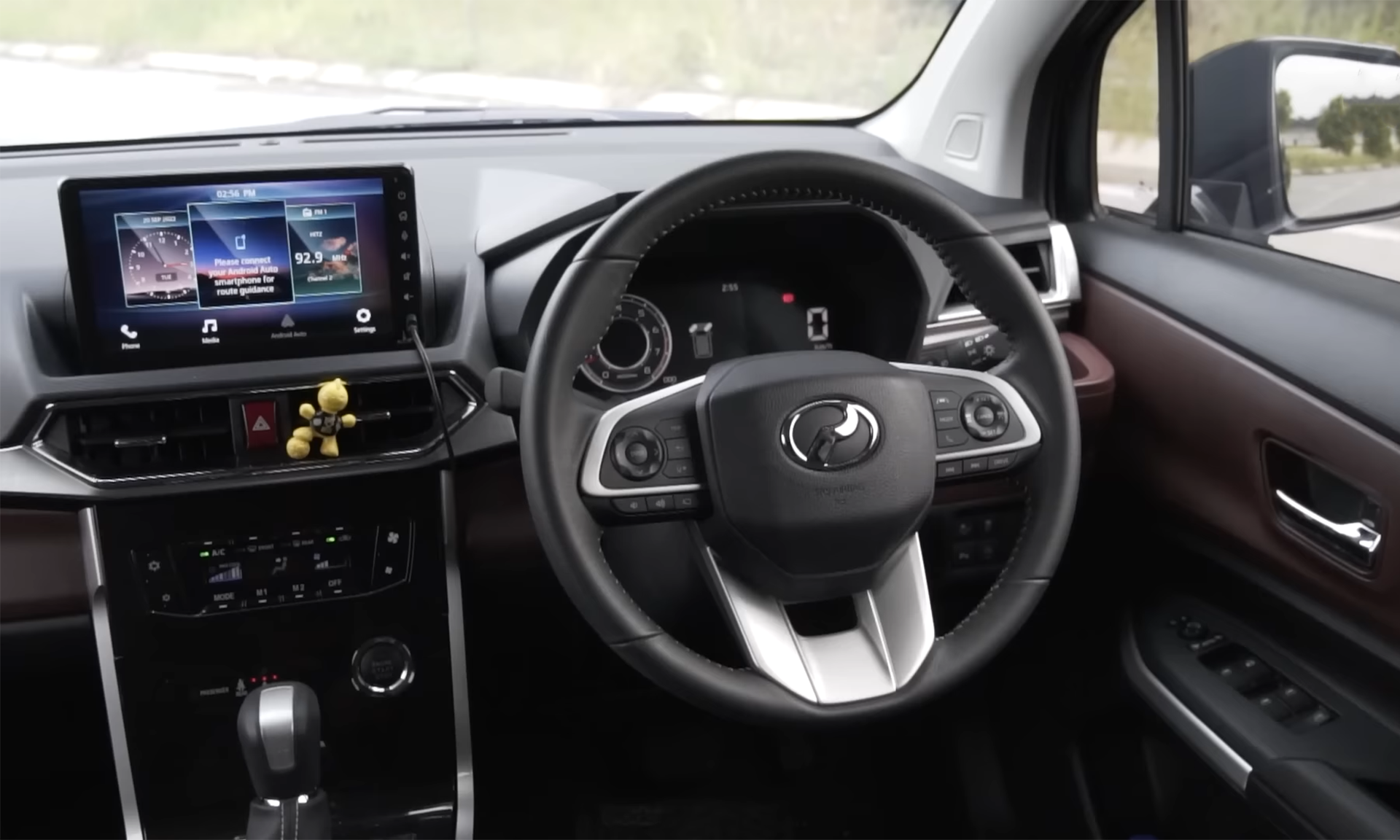
Interior

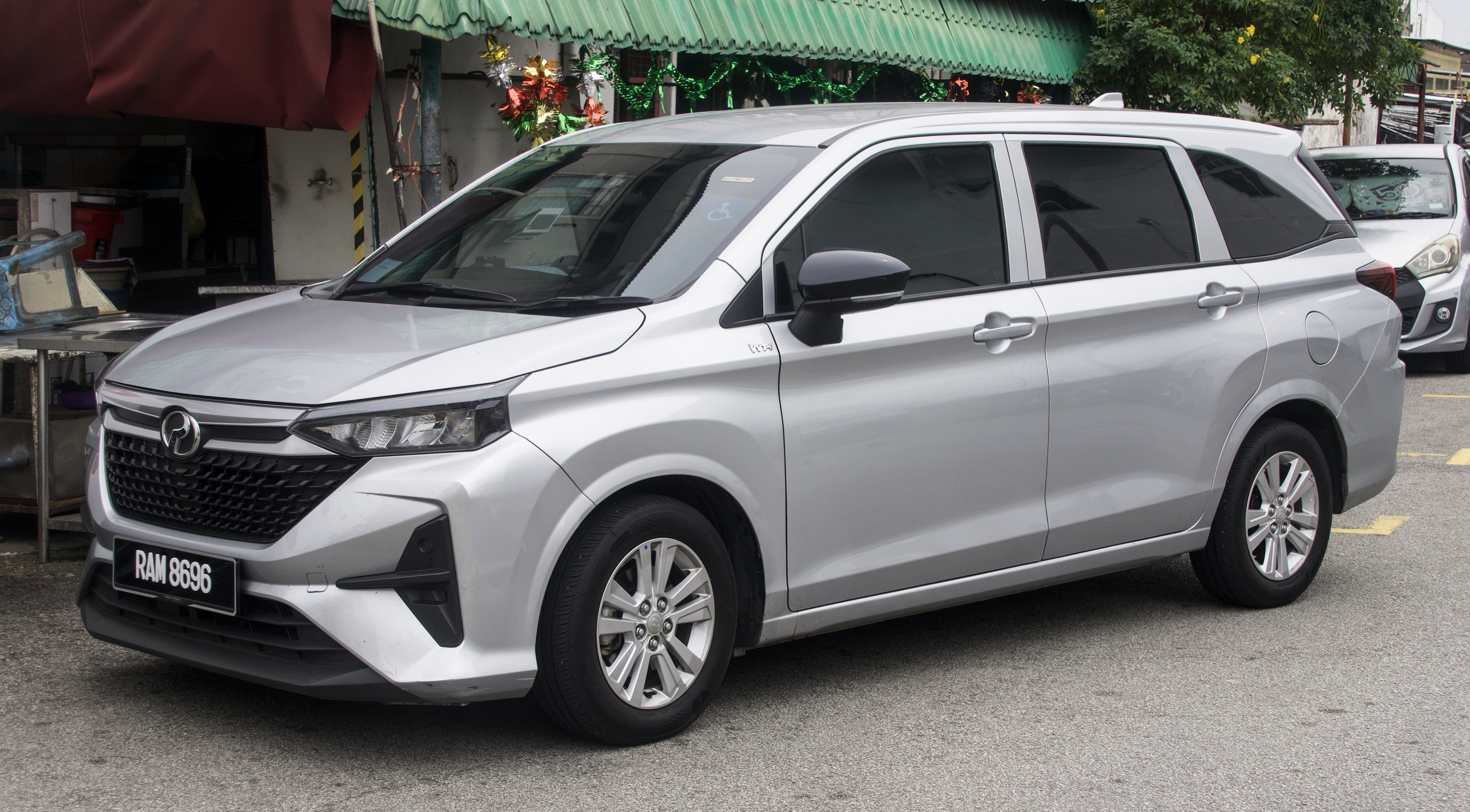
Perodua Alza X

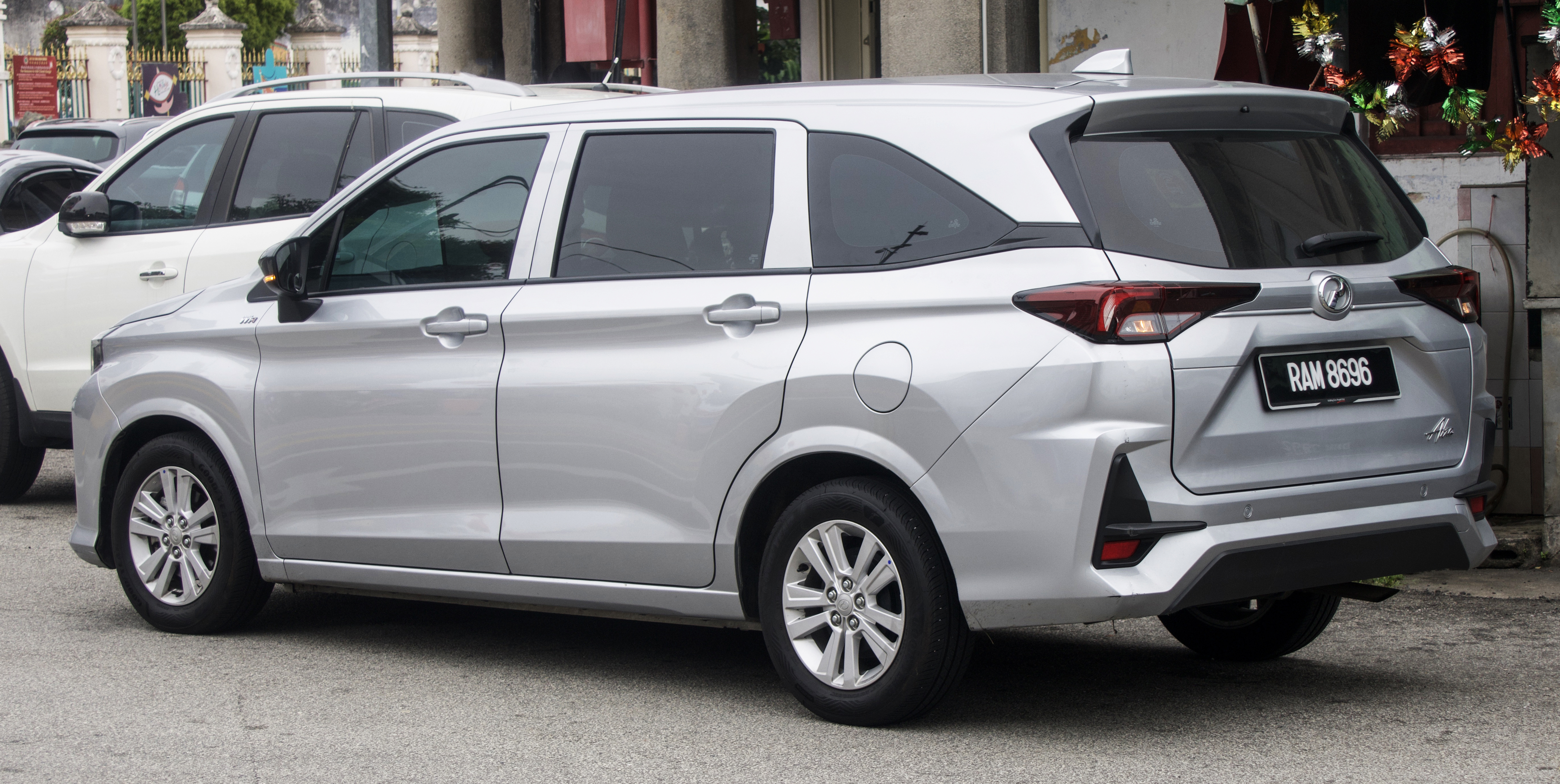
Perodua Alza X (Rear view)

=== Toyota Transmover ===
The production of second generation of Toyota Transmover began around July 2023. Just like the older model, it is exclusively available for the Indonesian market, especially for taxi or company fleet usage. This model is equivalent to the J trim for export markets, which is not available in Indonesia. Only the 1.3-litre engine and 5-speed manual transmission are available for this model.

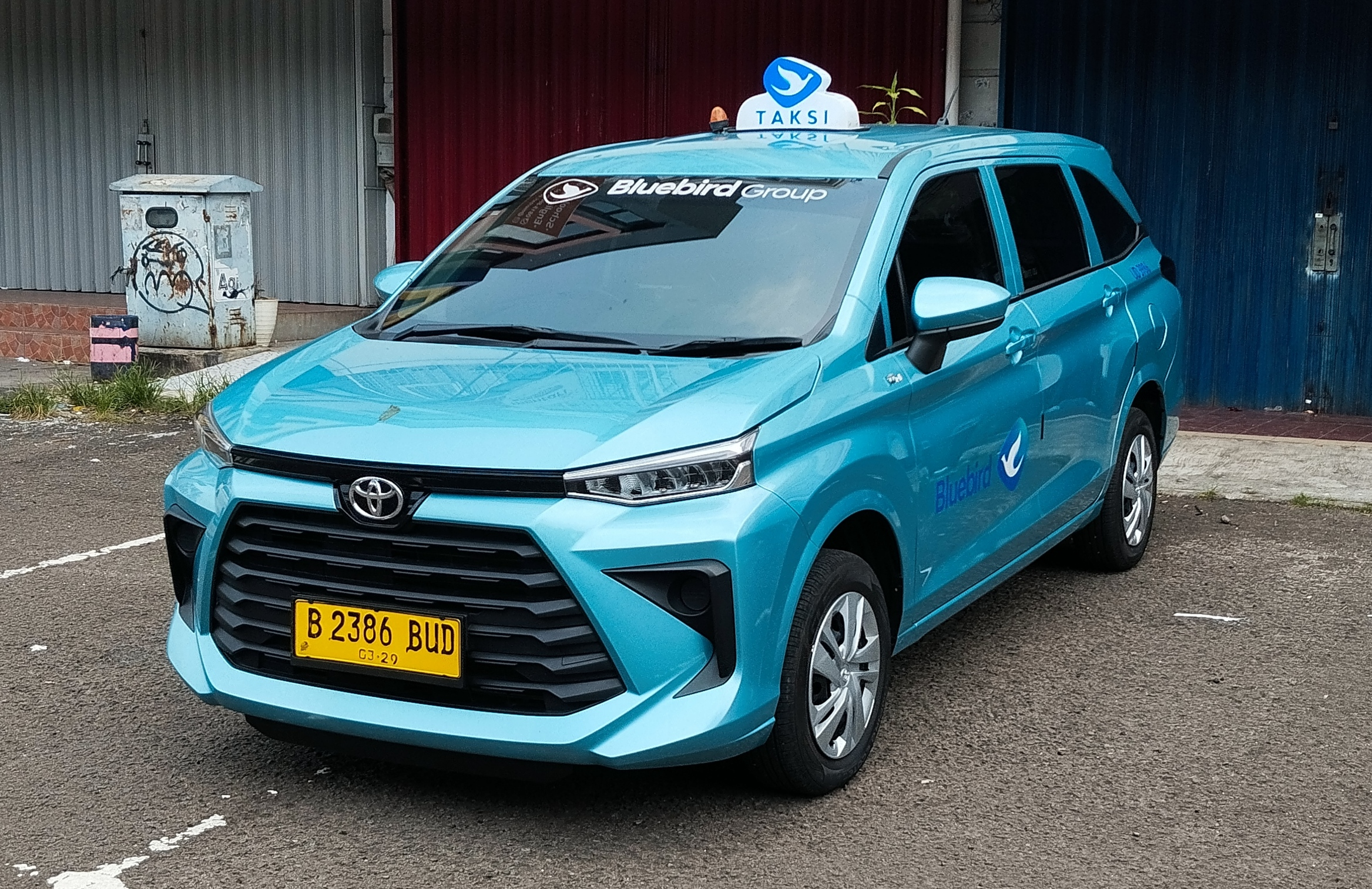
2023 Toyota Transmover (W100RE, Indonesia)

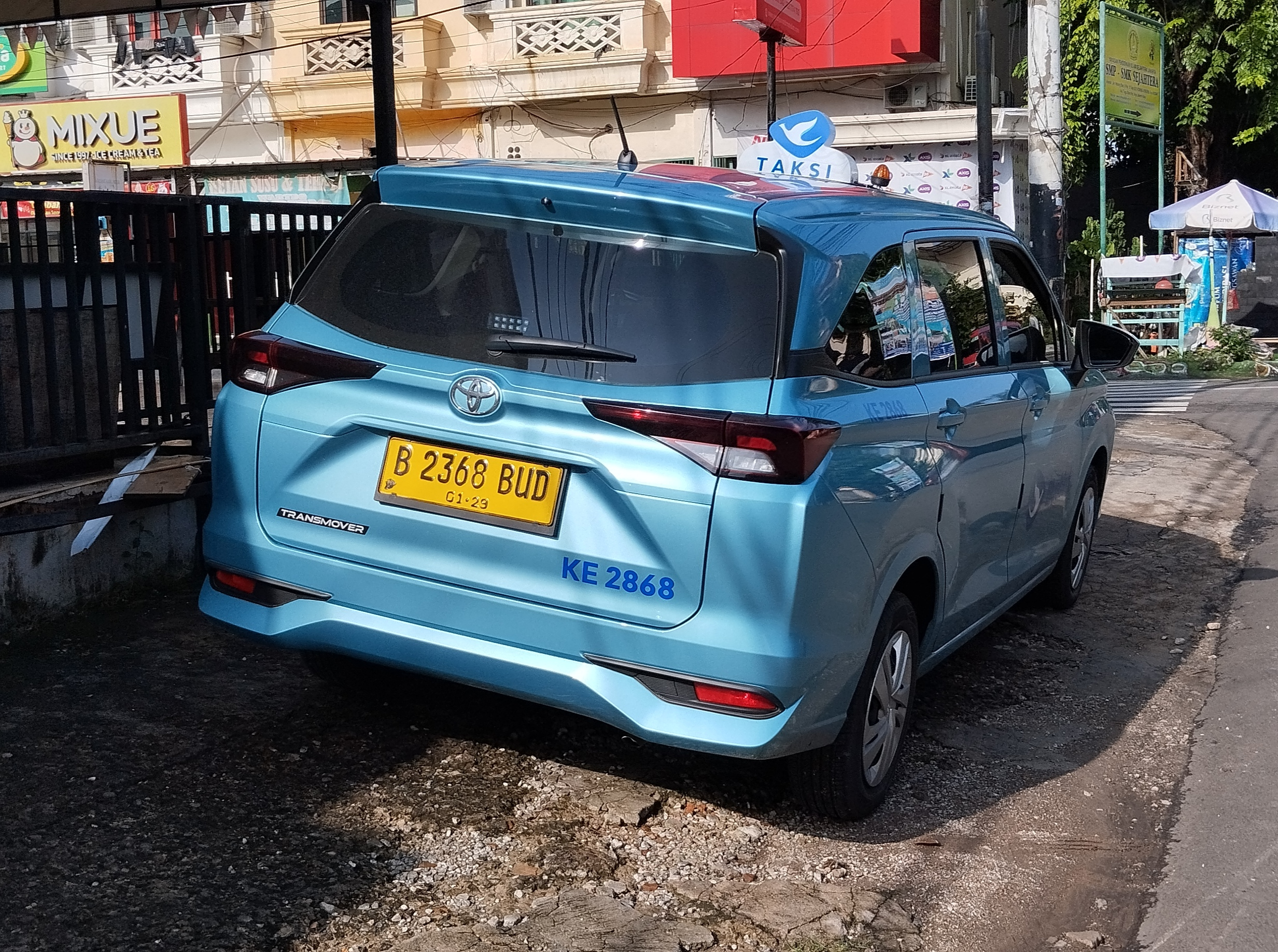
Rear view

=== Safety ===
ASEAN NCAP test results Toyota Veloz (2021)
Test	Points
Overall:	5 /5 stars
Adult occupant:	34.88
Child occupant:	17.17
Safety assist:	16.03
Motorcyclist Safety:	11.92

ASEAN NCAP test results Perodua Alza (2022)
Test	Points
Overall:	5 /5 stars
Adult occupant:	36.20
Child occupant:	16.88
Safety assist:	18.57
Motorcyclist Safety:	10.00

ASEAN NCAP test results Daihatsu Xenia (2023)
Test	Points
Overall:	3 /5 stars
Adult occupant:	32.63
Child occupant:	14.37
Safety assist:	10.00
Motorcyclist Safety:	7.50

=== Recall ===
In January 2024, Toyota issued a recall notice on 6,630 units of the Philippine market Avanza and Veloz produced between 12 September to 13 December 2022, which both models involved a fault during assembly caused damage to the front disc brake slide pin boot. The company stated that the affected units may have had rust which may lead to the early wear of the brake pads if any water enters the slide pin boots. Several days later, a separate recall was issued for the same vehicle in Indonesia and Philippines, which both models received improper welding on the side impact beam of the right front door. These may cause the strength of the welding could be insufficient and thus, may not offer enough protection and cause worse injuries to the occupants on the occasion that a side impact collision occurs. A total of 4,378 units in Indonesia produced in November 2022 and 2,756 units in the Philippines produced between 3 and 24 November 2022 were affected.

In February 2024, another recall was issued for the Avanza and Veloz marketed in Indonesia, Malaysia and Philippines alongside the Malaysian market Perodua Alza. These vehicles received an incorrect tightening of the front shock absorber nuts, which may cause damage to the vehicle posing risk to stability. A total of 163,654 units in Indonesia produced between October 2021 to September 2023 and 36,930 units in the Philippines produced between January 2022 to September 2023 were affected.

== Sales ==
By October 2011, there had been around 1 million Avanza/Xenia units sold, including around 113,000 exported units. In 2012, the Avanza/Xenia was the second best-selling MPV model globally after the Chrysler minivans.

By November 2018, around 2,750,576 units of Avanza/Xenia had been sold globally. The sales consisted of 1,714,196 Indonesian market Avanzas, 393,380 exported Avanzas, and around 643,000 Xenias.

=== Indonesia ===
Between 2006 and 2019, and in 2021, the Avanza held the position as the best-selling passenger car in Indonesia, before being overtaken by Honda Brio in 2020 and 2022 respectively.

By December 2019, the Avanza had sold around 1.8 million units in Indonesia.

Year	Toyota Avanza		Toyota Veloz		Daihatsu Xenia	
Year	Sales	Rank	Sales	Rank	Sales	Rank
2004	43,936	3			22,006	5
2005	54,893	2			27,505	6
2006	52,260	1			23,555	4
2007	62,010	1			28,914	3
2008	85,535	1			34,065	3
2009	100,065	1			43,409	2
2010	141,799	1			65,901	2
2011	162,367	1			66,835	2
2012	192,146	1			73,418	2
2013	213,458	1			64,611	2
2014	162,070	1			46,710	8
2015	129,205	1			36,262	8
2016	122,654	1			44,720	7
2017	116,311	1			38,535	8
2018	82,167	1			29,521	13
2019	86,374	1			21,674	16
2020	38,072	3			7,637	19
2021	56,349 (Note: 66,109 units combined with the W100 series Veloz)	1	9,760	N/A	15,555	16
2022	60,624	2	32,017	10	26,141	12
2023	59,543	4	20,820	13	14,344	21
2024	55,838	2	13,741	16	9,952	21
2025	40,148	3	9,212	24	5,537	30

=== Other markets (Avanza) ===
Year	Philippines	Thailand	Mexico	South Africa	Vietnam	Malaysia (Note: Figures based on registration)
2004						5,516
2005						37,353
2006						26,843
2007			1,307			24,109
2008			2,825			20,788
2009			3,021			11,477
2010			3,082			7,779
2011			3,672			7,027
2012			4,691			9,356
2013			4,873			6,913
2014		4,181	6,505			5,021
2015		1,683	8,254			5,170
2016	13,466	1,107	11,278			2,400
2017	15,463	552	12,294	5,321		2,281
2018	10,952	352	11,315		375	2,882
2019	8,185	436	9,208		489	1,441
2020	5,531		7,132		357	1,356
2021	4,411		9,302	2,379	32	1,215
2022			8,801		3,592	10
2023	13,458		11,784		3,783	1
2024	17,489		10,828		2,142	2
2025			11,846			

=== Other markets (Veloz) ===
Year	Thailand	Philippines	Vietnam	Malaysia (Note: Figures based on registration (Malaysia))
2022	10,887	7,720	14,104	3,571
2023	11,508	13,672	9,318	7,871
2024	3,913	13,766	8,341	7,110
2025				6,782

=== Other markets (Perodua Alza) ===
Year	Malaysia
2022	24,240
2023	37,775
2024	44,374
2025	45,534

== See also ==
- List of Toyota vehicles
- List of Daihatsu vehicles
