= Toyota Yaris (XP150) =

Subcompact car manufactured by Toyota

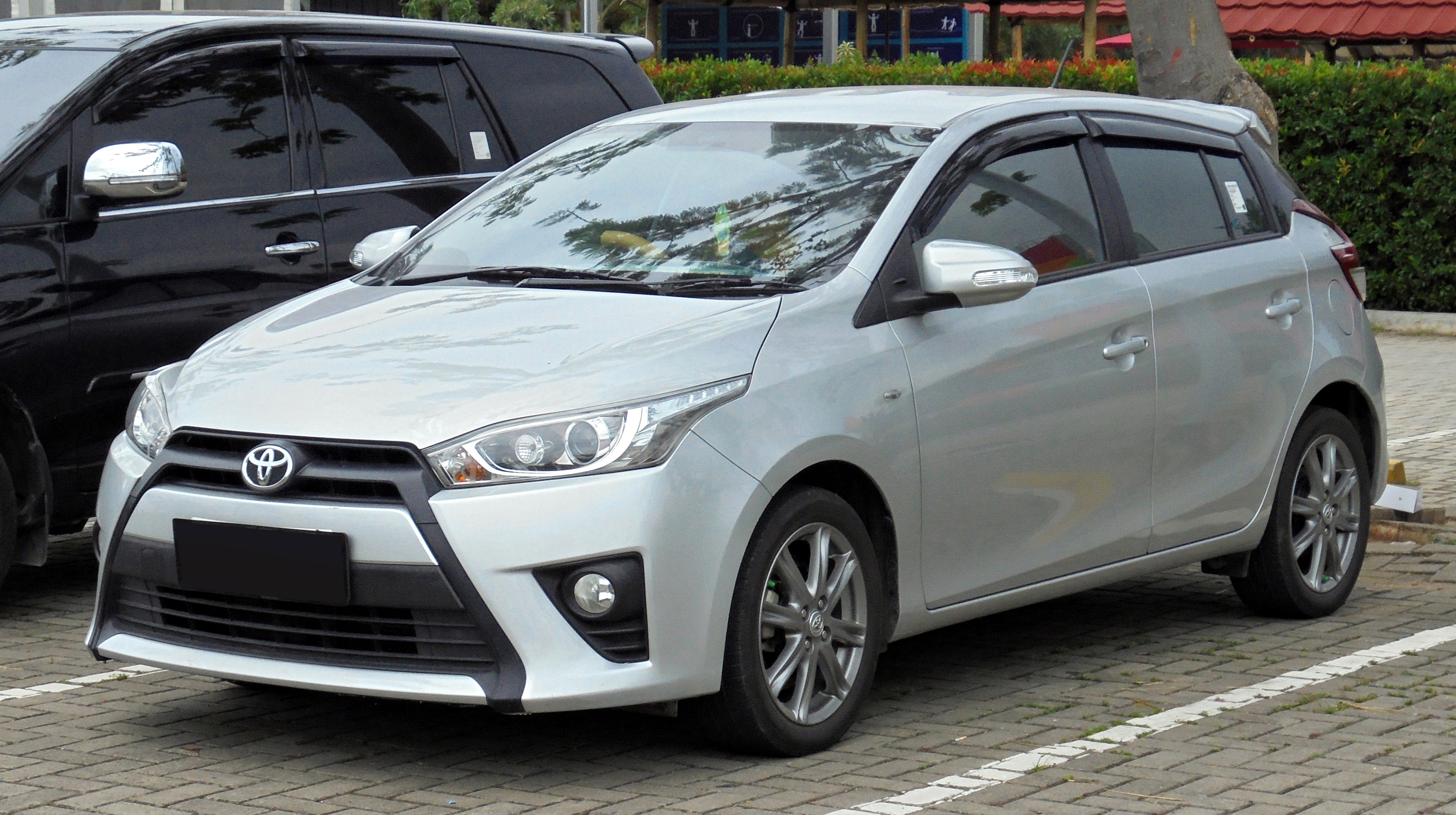
- 2015 Toyota Yaris 1.5 G (NCP150; pre-facelift, Indonesia)

Overview
- Manufacturer: Toyota
- Also called: Toyota Vios (Asia; sedan)/Vios FS (China; hatchback, FAW-Toyota)
- Production: April 2013 – present
- Assembly: Thailand: Chachoengsao (TMT); Indonesia: Karawang (TMMIN); Malaysia: Bukit Raja (UMW); Philippines: Santa Rosa (TMP, sedan only); China: Guangzhou (GAC Toyota); Taiwan: Guanyin (Kuozui Motors); Brazil: Sorocaba; India: Bidadi, Karnataka (TKM, sedan only); Pakistan: Karachi (IMC, sedan only)
- Designer: List: Kiyotaka Yoshida, Noriyuki Nakamura and Tetsuya Nakagawa (hatchback); Hideyuki Numata, Hiroaki Suzuki, Kazuhiko Isawa and Makoto Takahashi (sedan); Donny Adhi Yuwono and Akbar Juniarto (Yaris TRD Sportivo – 2016 minor update, Heykers and 2018 facelift); Yukihiro Koide and Takuya Watabe (2018 facelift); Hisatoshi Katsukawa and Yoshikazu Shoji (2020 facelift); Jing-qi Zhao and Yun Yang (Chinese-market Vios, 2020 facelift)

Body and chassis
- Class: Subcompact car (B)
- Body style: 5-door hatchback; 4-door sedan
- Layout: Front-engine, front-wheel-drive
- Platform: Toyota new EFC platform

Powertrain
- Engine: Petrol: 1.2 L 3NR-FE I4 (NSP152; Thailand only); 1.2 L 3NR-FKE I4 (NSP152; Thailand only, 2019–present); 1.3 L 2NZ-FE I4 (NCP151); 1.3 L 1NR-FE I4 (NSP150); 1.3 L 6NR-FE I4 (NSP150; China only); 1.5 L 1NZ-FE I4 (NCP150; 2013–2016); 1.5 L 2NR-FE I4 (NSP151; 2016–present); 1.5 L 2NR-FBE I4 (NSP151; Brazil only); 1.5 L 7NR-FE I4 (NSP151; China only)
- Transmission: 5/6-speed manual; 4-speed automatic; Aisin K411 Super CVT-i

Dimensions
- Wheelbase: 2,550 mm (100.4 in)
- Length: 4,115–4,145 mm (162.0–163.2 in); 4,420–4,440 mm (174.0–174.8 in) (sedan)
- Width: 1,700–1,730 mm (66.9–68.1 in)
- Height: 1,475–1,500 mm (58.1–59.1 in)
- Kerb weight: 1,010–1,095 kg (2,227–2,414 lb); 1,035–1,150 kg (2,282–2,535 lb) (sedan)

Chronology
- Predecessor: Toyota Yaris (XP90) (parts of Asia); Toyota Yaris (XP130) (some international markets); Toyota Etios sedan (India)
- Successor: Toyota Yaris (AC100) (sedan); Toyota Starlet/Glanza (South Africa/India)

The XP150 series Toyota Yaris is a subcompact car produced and sold by Toyota under the Yaris nameplate since 2013. Marketed exclusively for emerging markets, it is the hatchback counterpart of the XP150 series Vios subcompact sedan, which in some markets also shared the same Yaris nameplate. It is larger and longer than the unrelated XP130 series Yaris hatchback (Vitz in Japan) which was marketed in Japan, North America, Europe and Australasia, and the succeeding TNGA-based XP210 series Yaris.

The vehicle design was previewed by the Dear Qin hatchback concept that was first displayed at the Auto China in April 2012. The production vehicle made its public debut at the 15th Auto Shanghai in April 2013, and was rolled out to several Asian markets including China, Taiwan, Southeast Asia and the Middle East. The vehicle was also marketed as the Yaris Sport in Chile since 2014, and in Mexico and Argentina from 2016. In some markets such as Chile, Mexico and South Africa, it replaced the XP130 series Yaris hatchback. In 2021 in South Africa, it was replaced by the Suzuki-sourced Starlet.

== Markets ==
=== Latin America ===
Replacing the XP130 series Vitz-based Yaris Liftback, the facelift model XP150 series Yaris is also sold in Latin American region. In Mexico, the Yaris line up includes the Yaris Hatchback, the Yaris Ativ-based Sedan and the Mazda2-based Toyota Yaris R sedan.

Model grades and equipment for the Yaris Hatchback are varied across the countries. In Brazil, the locally built cars are sold as 1.3 XL, 1.5 XS and 1.5 XLS. Meanwhile, in Argentina, the trim levels are XS, XLS and S. All models are powered by the 1.5-litre engine.

==== Safety ====
===== Latin NCAP =====
In 2021, the vehicle in its most basic Latin American configuration with 2 airbags was tested for automotive safety by Latin NCAP 3.0 (similar to Euro NCAP 2014). It received 1 star out of a possible 5.

Latin NCAP 3.0 test results Toyota Yaris + 2 Airbags (2021, similar to Euro NCAP 2014)
Test	Points	%
Overall:	1 /5 stars	
Adult occupant:	16.57	41%
Child occupant:	31.29	64%
Pedestrian:	25.98	62%
Safety assist:	18.00	42%

In 2025, the vehicle in its most basic Latin American configuration with 6 airbags was tested for automotive safety by Latin NCAP 3.0 (similar to Euro NCAP 2014). It received 2 stars out of a possible 5.

Latin NCAP 3.5 test results Toyota Yaris Sedan / Hatchback + 6 Airbags (2025, similar to Euro NCAP 2017)
Test	Points	%
Overall:	2 /5 stars	
Adult occupant:	26.32	66%
Child occupant:	31.29	64%
Pedestrian:	25.72	54%
Safety assist:	25.00	58%

=== China ===
The Chinese market had been previously released the regular XP90 Vitz-based Yaris produced locally by the GAC Toyota joint venture. The XP150 model is also sold in China as the Yaris L (Chinese: 致炫; pinyin: Zhìxuàn), available in 1.3-litre 6NR-FE and 1.5-litre 7NR-FE versions, with either 5-speed manual or 4-speed automatic transmission. The facelifted Yaris L conducted by the GAC Toyota joint venture was unveiled at the Auto China in April 2016 and a sedan version (Chinese: 致享; pinyin: Zhìxiǎng) based on the Vios sedan was later added. Along with the facelift, the 4-speed automatic transmission was replaced by the CVT. The crossover-inspired variant of the Yaris L, called Yaris L X (Chinese: 致炫X; pinyin: Zhìxuàn X), was unveiled at the Auto Guangzhou on November 22, 2019, with some design elements from the XP210 series Yaris.

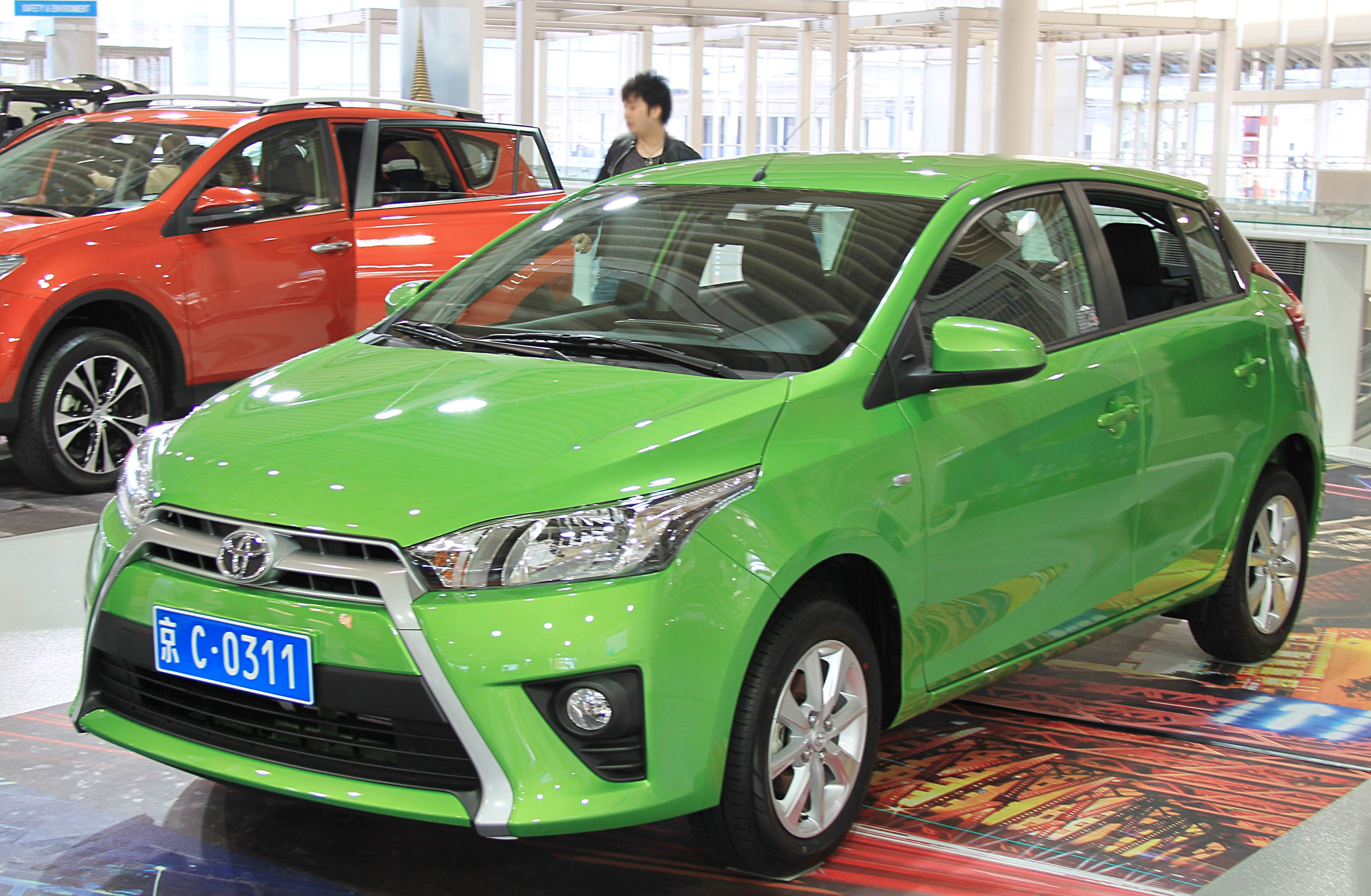
Yaris L (China; pre-facelift)

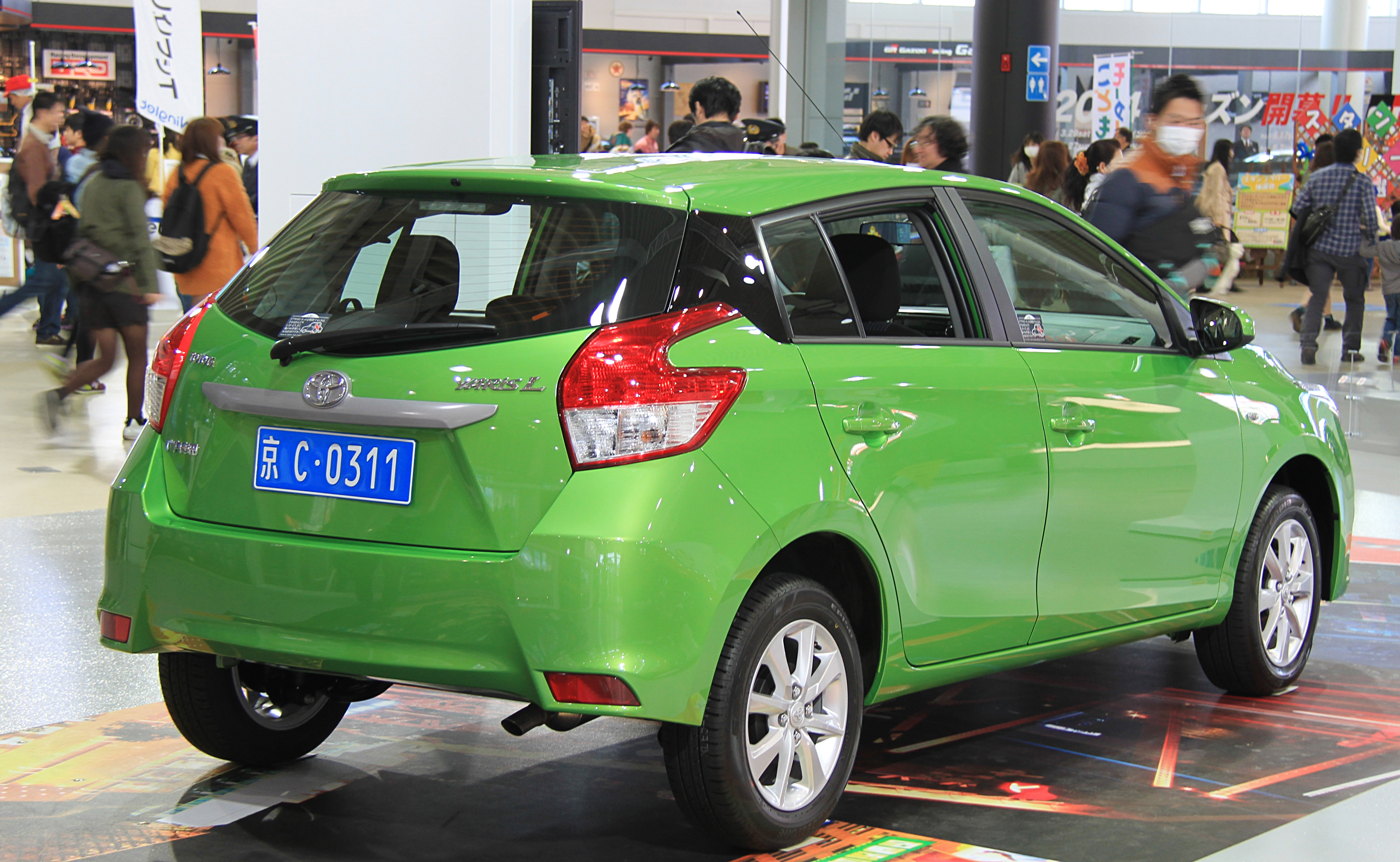
Yaris L (China; pre-facelift)

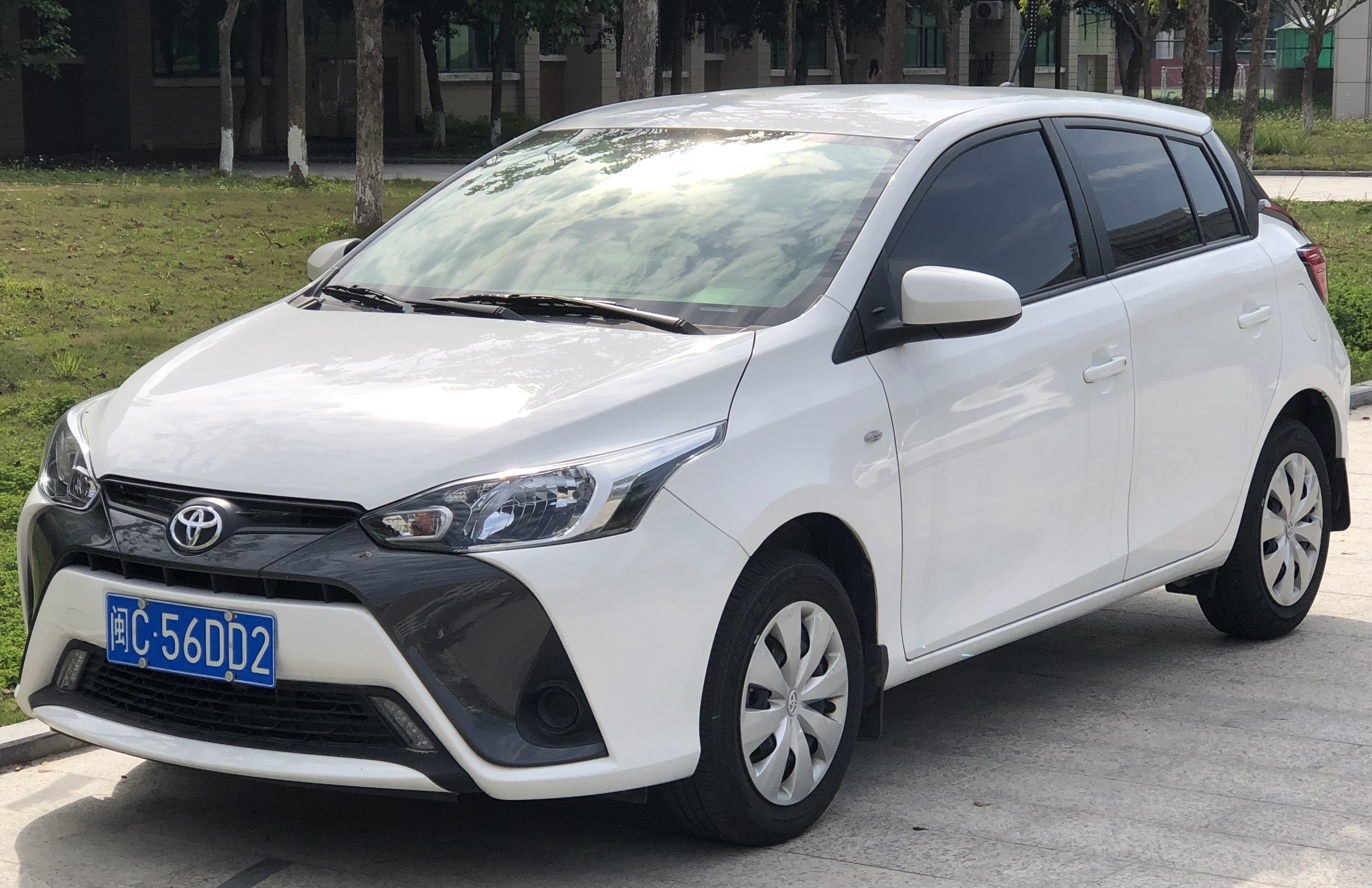
Yaris L (China; facelift)

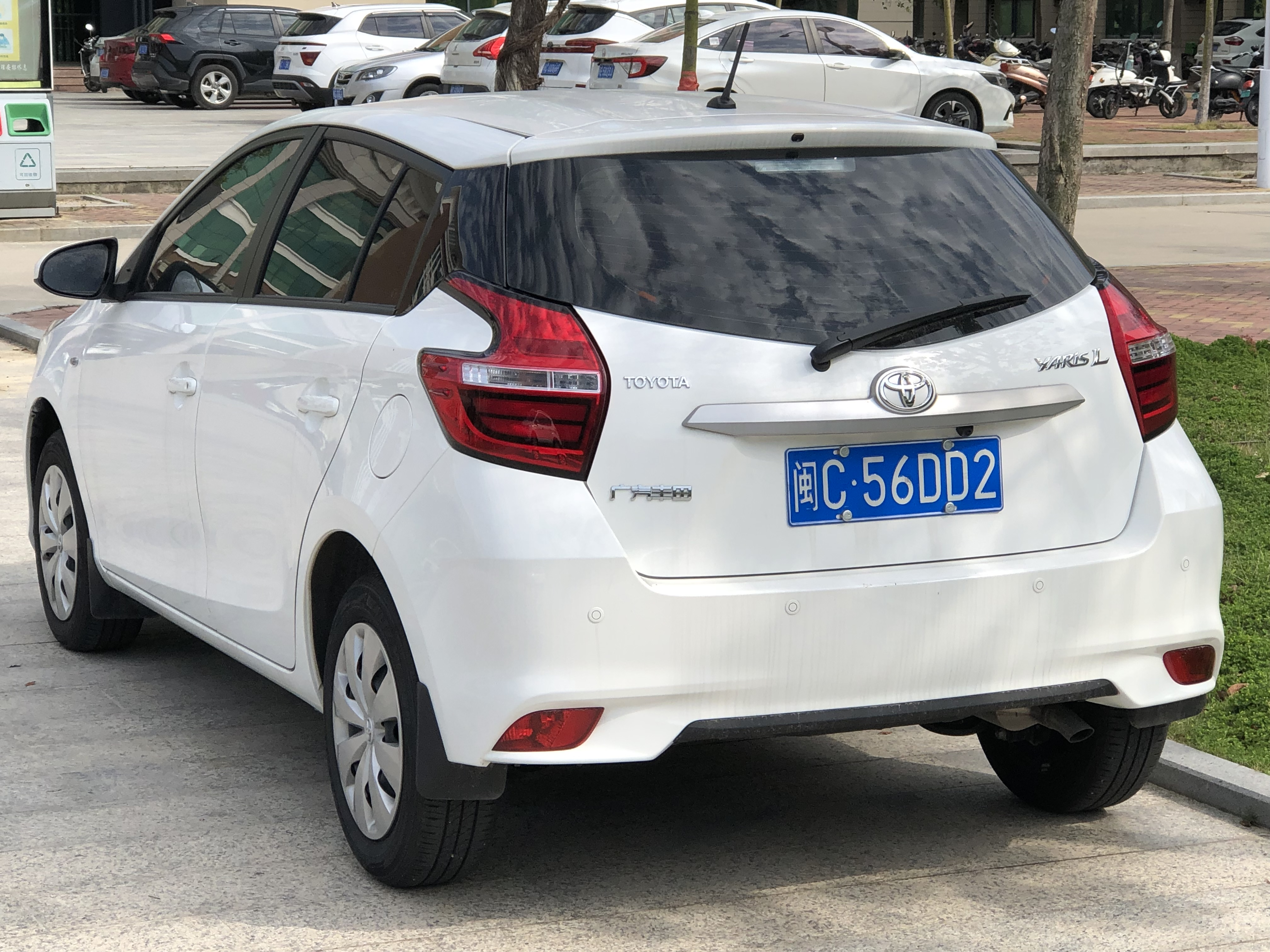
Yaris L (China; facelift)

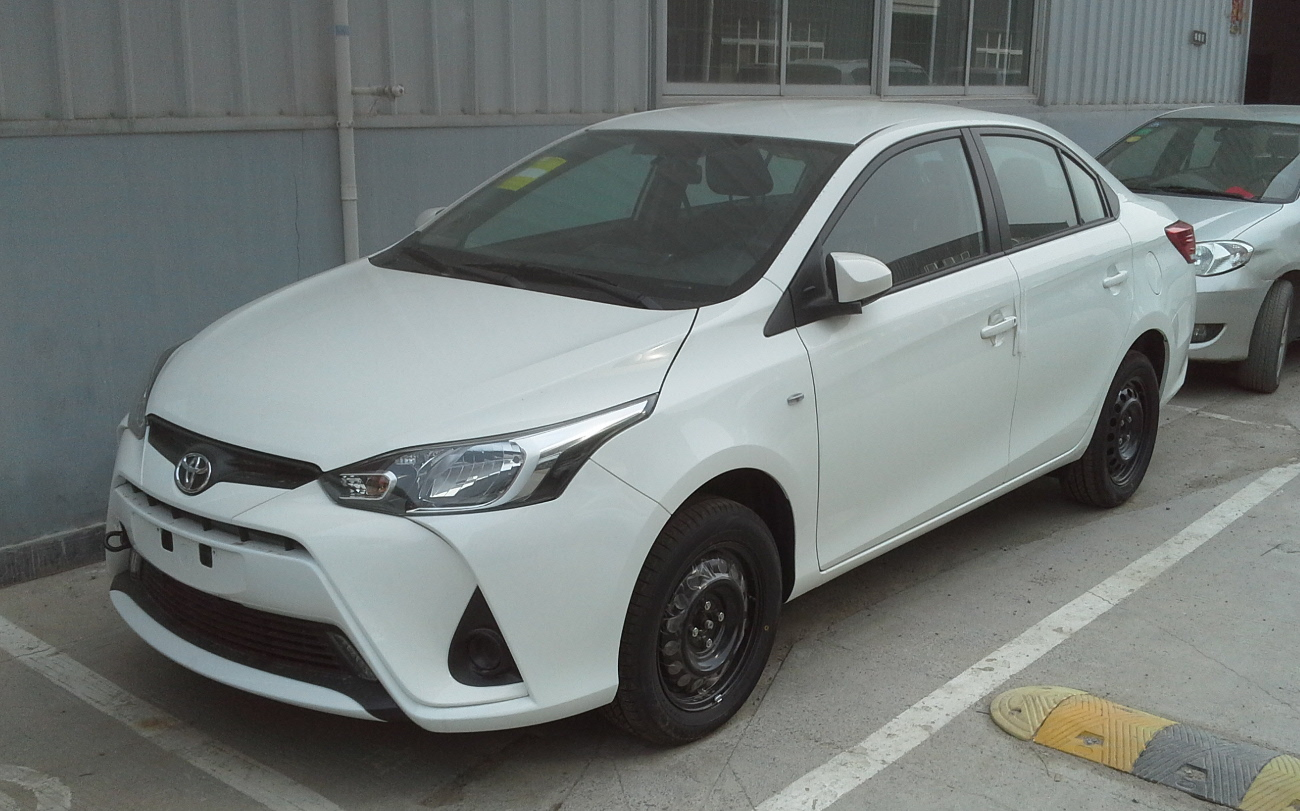
Yaris L sedan (China; facelift)

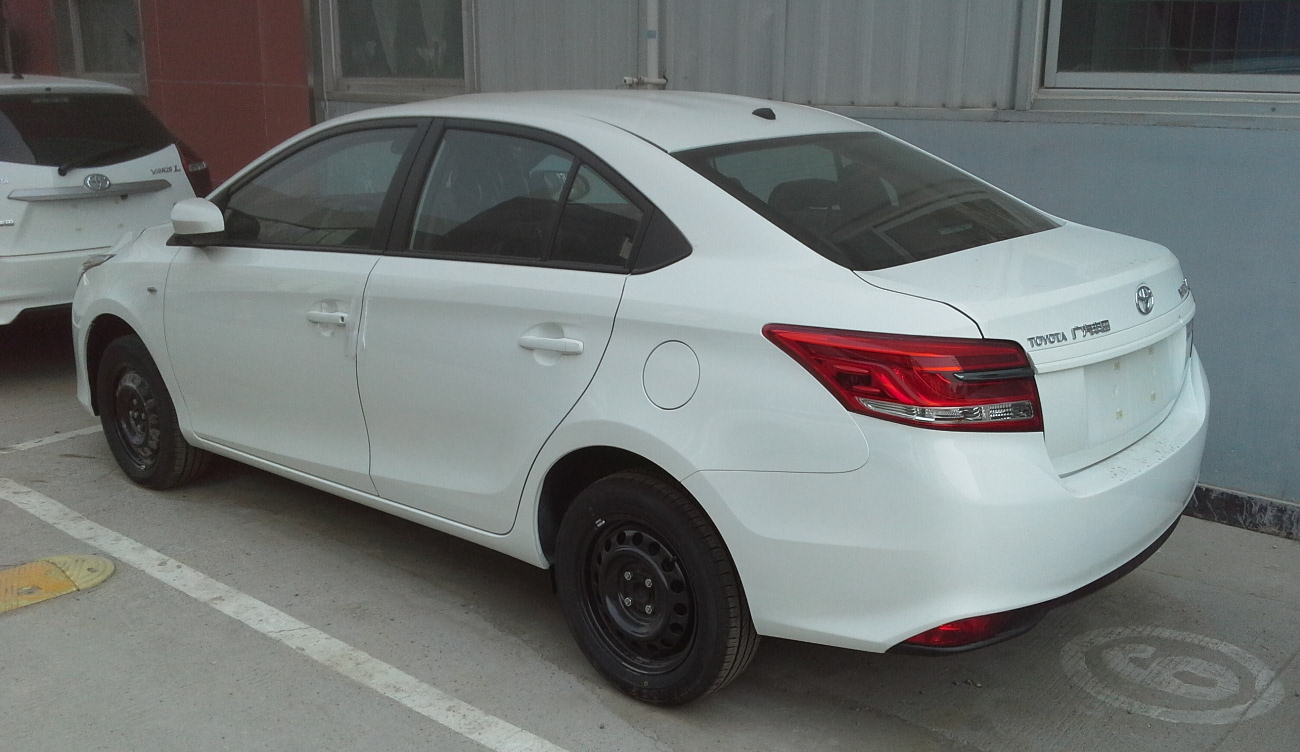
Yaris L sedan (China; facelift)

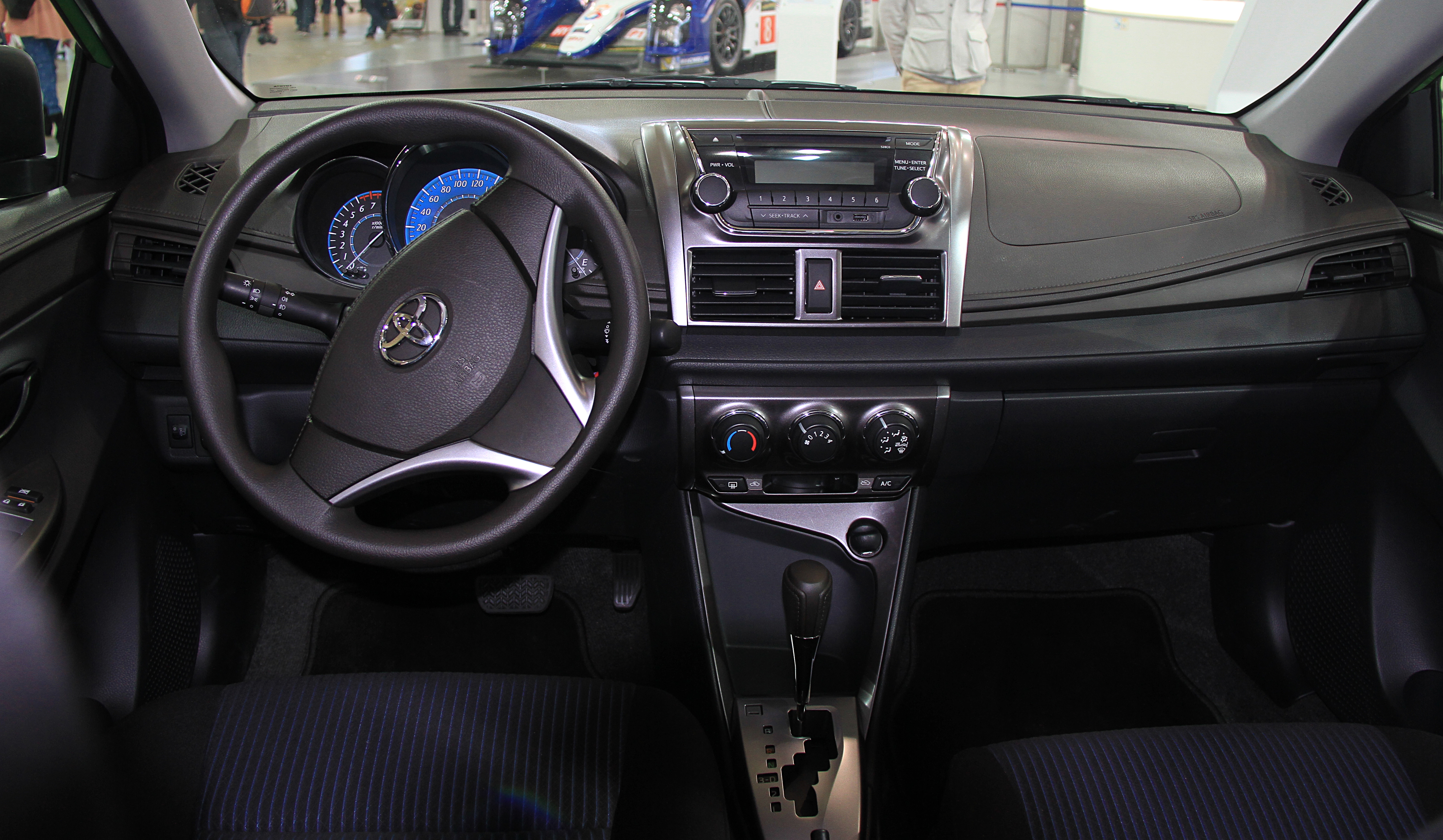
Yaris L interior

=== Thailand ===
The Yaris was launched in Thailand in October 2013, using the 1.2-litre 3NR-FE engine, granting the Yaris as part of the "eco-car" program in Thailand. Models offered were later further simplified as Entry, Sport and Sport Premium. It received a second facelift alongside the Yaris Ativ sibling in August 2020, featuring updated front bumper fascia and dual LED lens LED projection lenses with integrated daytime running lamp (DRL) on the Sport and Sport Premium models. Both models were received a slight redesign in September 2021.

=== Indonesia ===
The XP150 series Yaris was revealed for the Indonesian market at the Yaris Show Off “Best of the Best” event on December 5, 2013 and launched on March 17, 2014, which is assembled in Karawang, Indonesia. It uses the 1.5-litre 1NZ-FE engine. Trim levels offered are: E, G and TRD Sportivo with either manual or automatic transmission.

The XP150 series Yaris received an update on November 3, 2016 with the 1.5-litre 2NR-FE engine. The automatic transmission was replaced with CVT. The G trim got only restyled alloy wheels, but the TRD Sportivo gained slightly different fog light housings on the front bumper and black roof spoiler with red inner side. A facelift was released for the hatchback model only in September 2020 with updated bumpers and headlamps with only G and TRD variants due to market response. For the G model, it retains halogen projector headlamps used in the pre-facelift but daytime running lamps is excluded while the TRD model receives the new dual LED lenses headlamps with integrated Daytime running lamps with additional TRD bodykit fitment and unique TRD stitched seats.

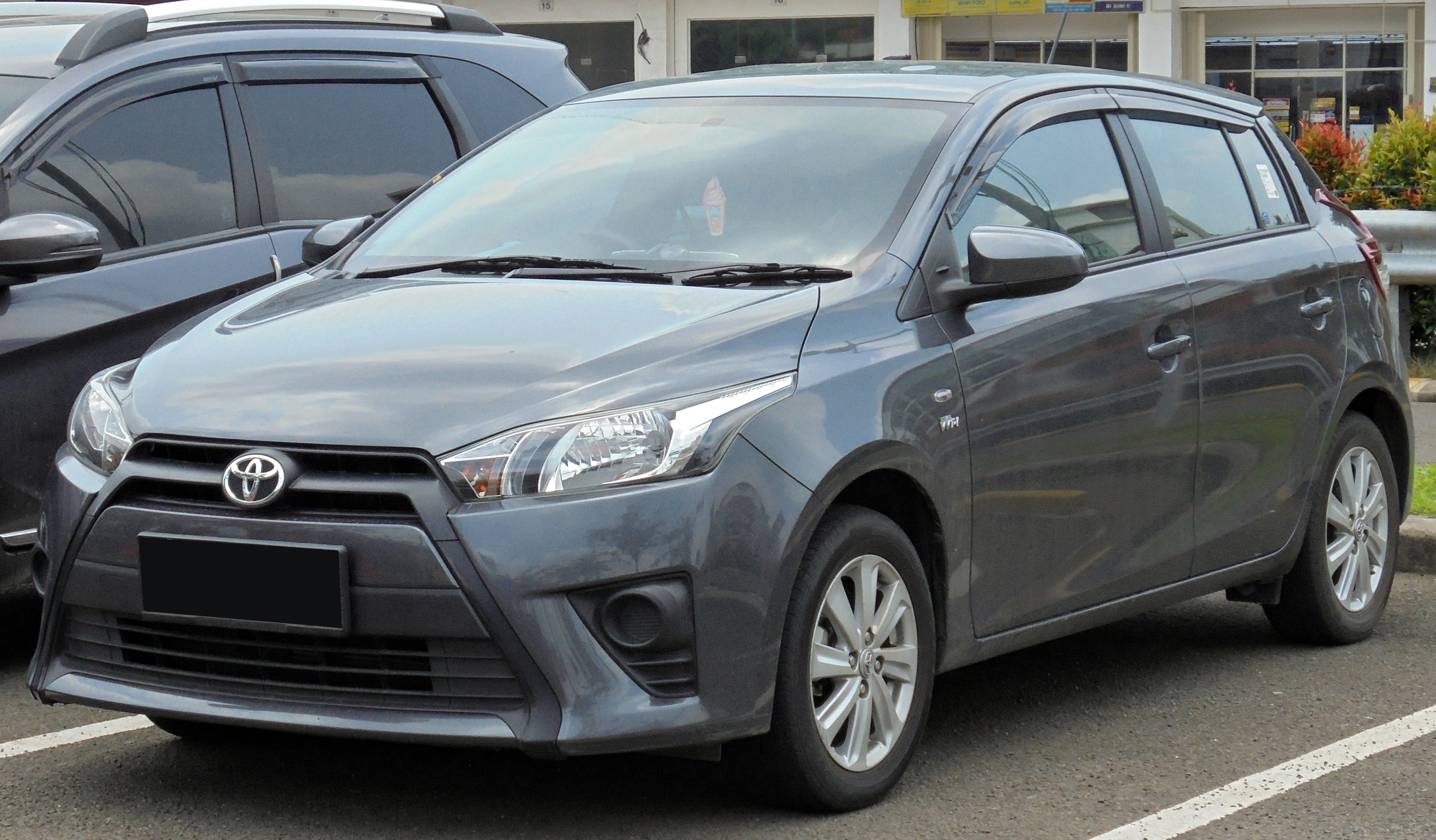
2017 Yaris 1.5 E (NSP151)

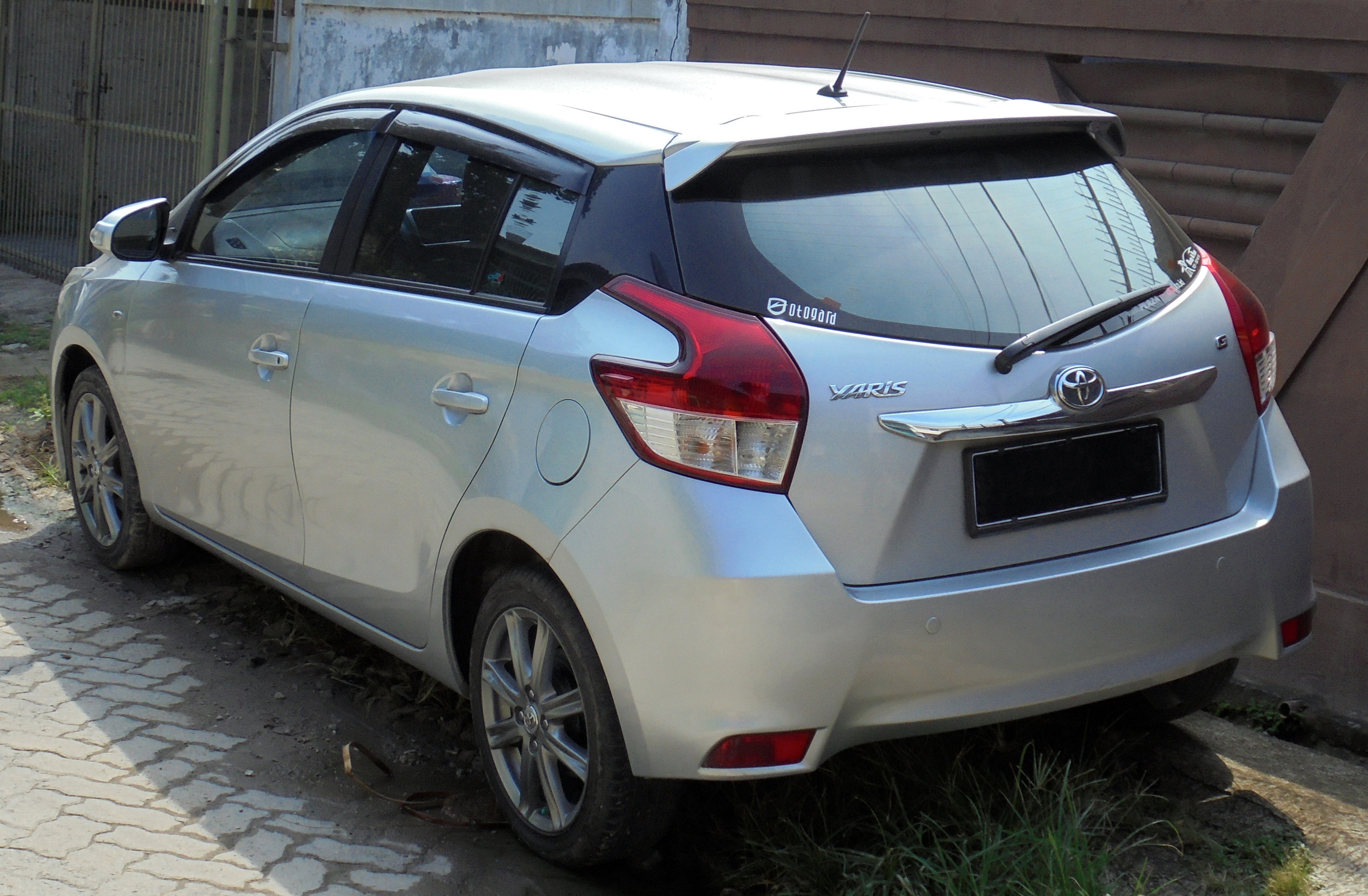
2015 Yaris 1.5 G (NCP150)

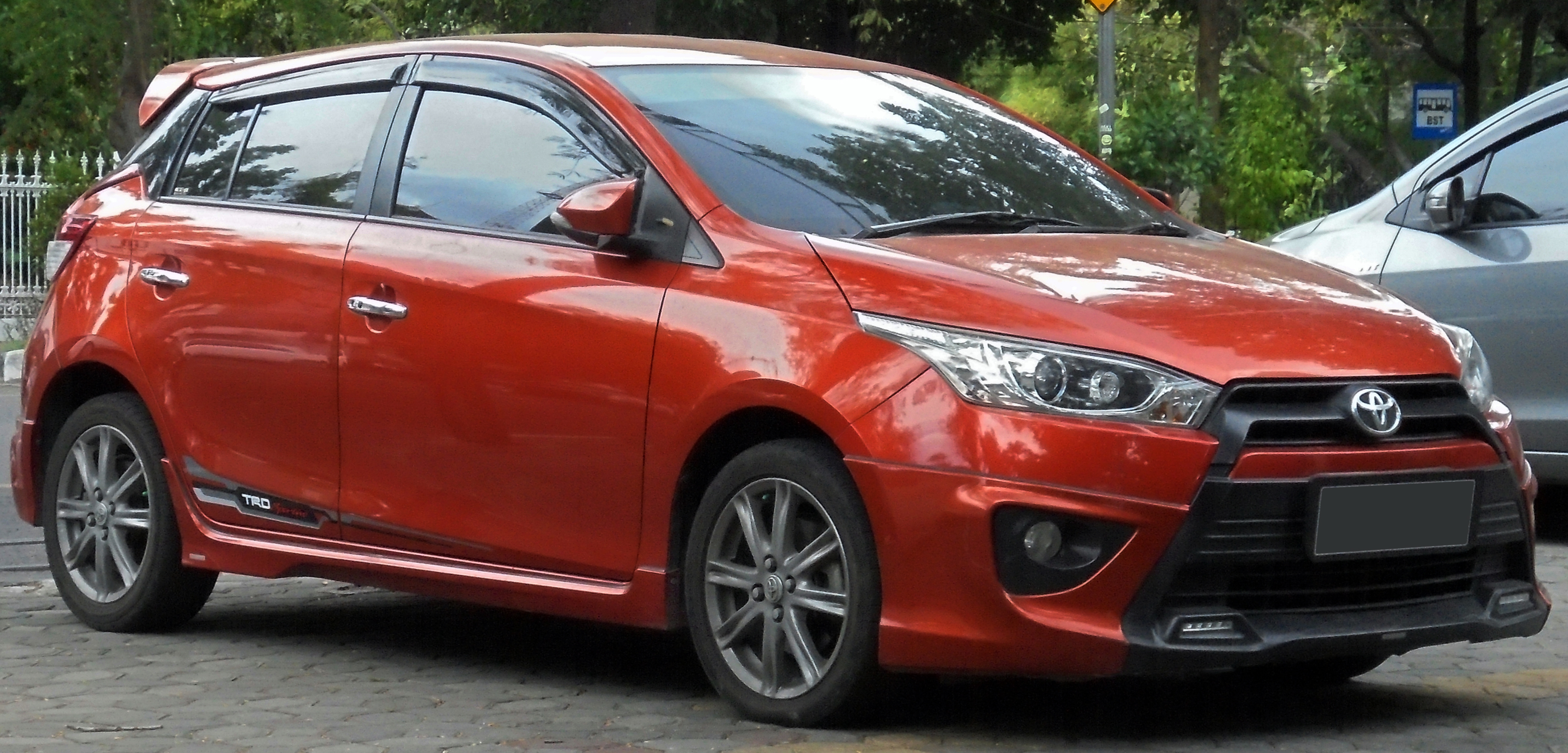
2015 Yaris 1.5 TRD Sportivo (NCP150)

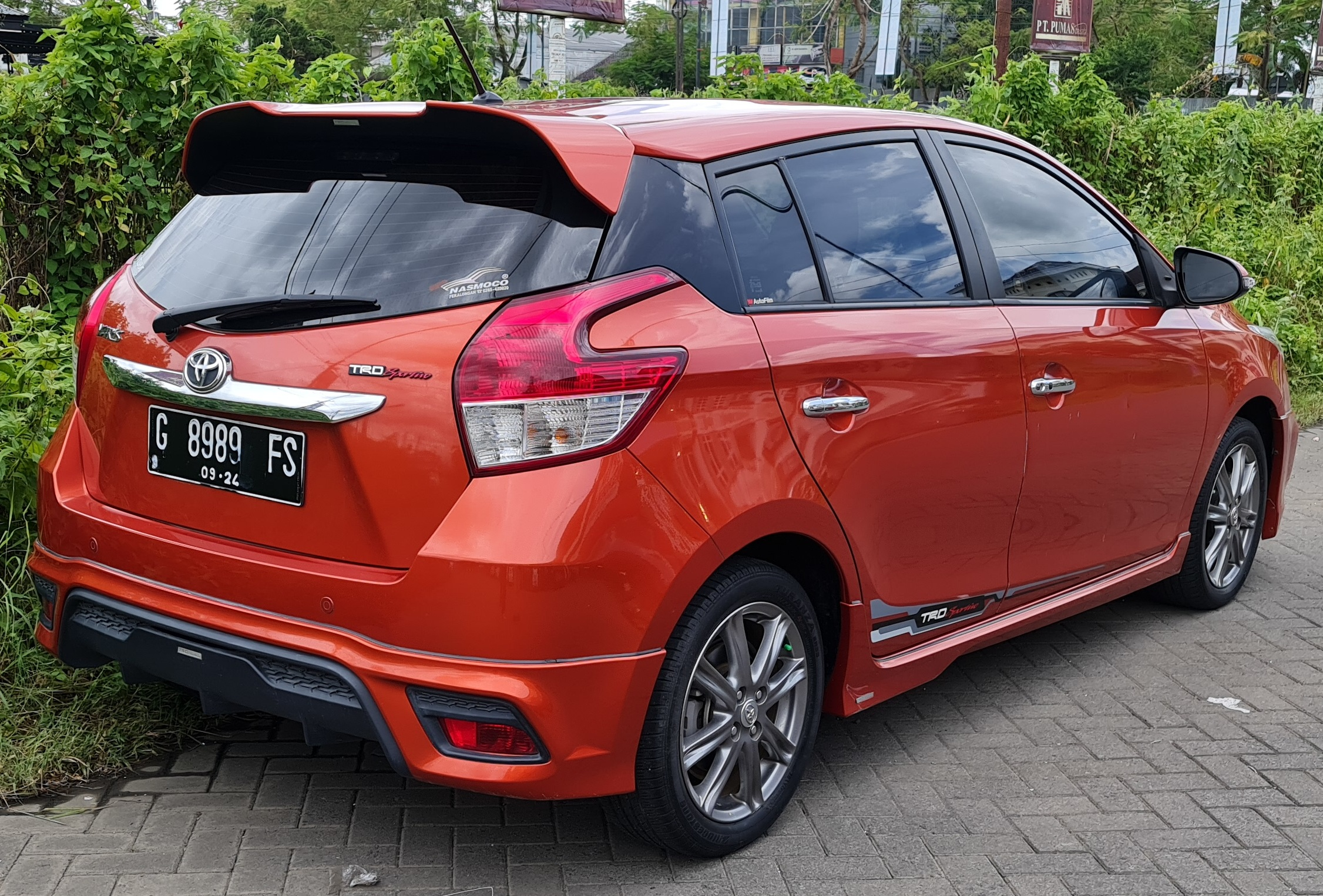
2014 Yaris 1.5 TRD Sportivo (NCP150)

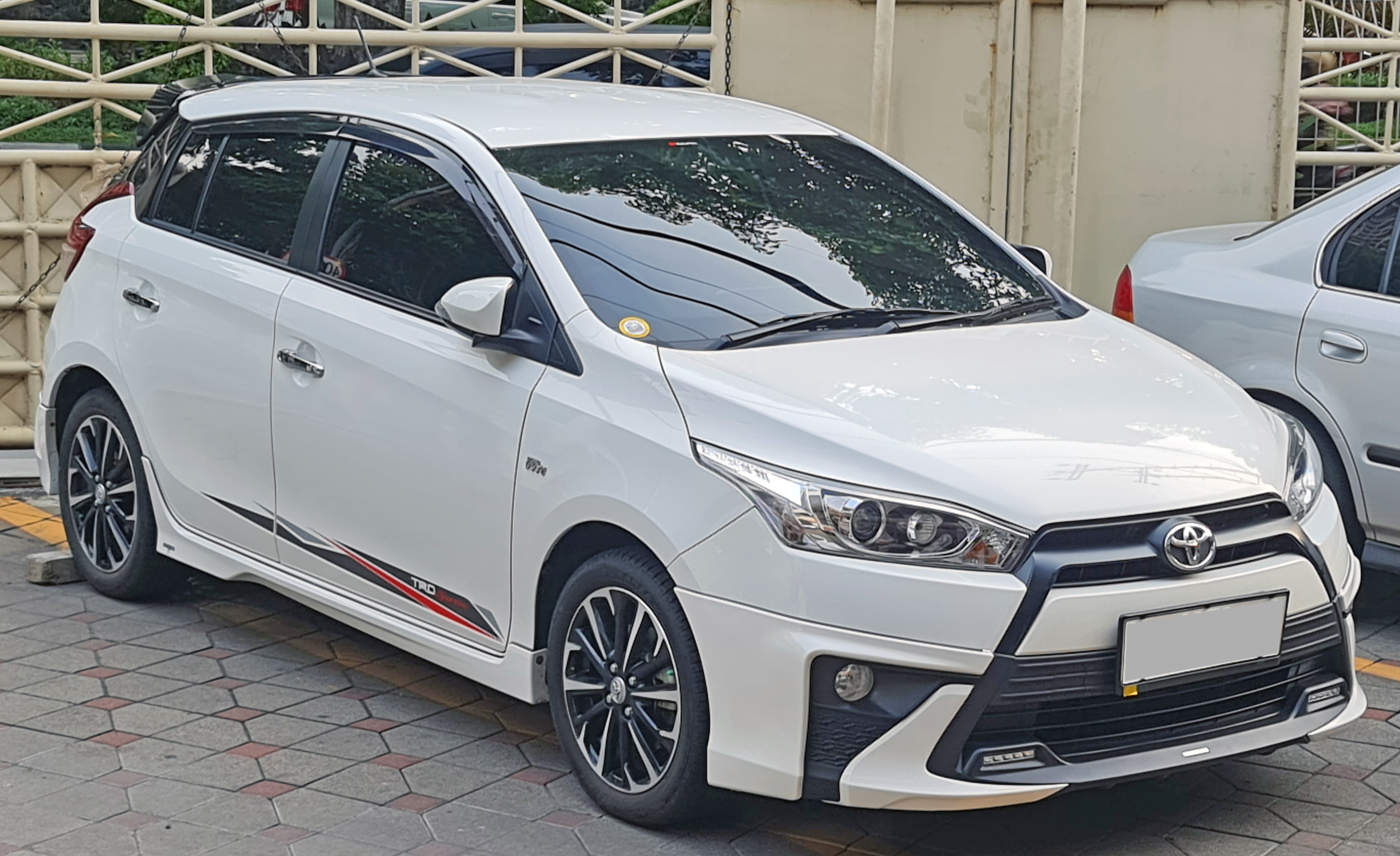
2017 Yaris 1.5 TRD Sportivo (NSP151)

=== Philippines ===
The XP150 series Yaris was launched in the Philippines in April 2014 and sold in two trim levels: the 1.3 E and the 1.5 G. It carries the same engine as the same year Vios, the 1.5-litre 1NZ-FE and the 1.3-litre 2NZ-FE. The 1.3 E is available in both a 5-speed manual or a 4-speed automatic transmission, while the 1.5 G only gets a 4-speed automatic transmission.

In late 2016, both the Yaris and Vios received a major mid-cycle upgrade with new Dual VVT-i engines as standard on all variants: the 1.3-litre 1NR-FE and 1.5-litre 2NR-FE for the E and G models, respectively. The engine upgrade also replaced the old 4-speed automatic with a new CVT transmission, while retaining the same 5-speed manual for the E grade. In the interior, the G model is equipped with a MirrorLink head unit.

In December 2017, the first facelift Yaris was offered in 2 grades: 1.3 E (5-speed manual and CVT) and 1.5 S (CVT only). All models came with an infotainment system with Mirrorlink. The second facelift Yaris was released in December 2020, trim levels remained the same as the first facelift model: 1.3 E and 1.5 S, it was only offered with a CVT transmission. The E M/T variant were discontinued from the lineup. All models came with Apple CarPlay and Android Auto as standard. In November 2023, the Yaris hatchback was discontinued for the Philippine market due to low sales.

=== Vietnam ===
The Yaris hatchback is offered in only 1.5G variant offering top spec equipment including halogen projector headlamps, rear LED lamps, automatic AC climate controls, optitron speedometer with MID display and 16” inch rims and received a facelift to the Yaris hatchback only in October 2020 featuring dual LED lenses headlamp and new facelifted front bumper.

== Facelifts ==
=== 2017 facelift ===
The XP150 series Yaris hatchback received its first facelift in Thailand on 14 September 2017. It comes with the same front fascia as the Yaris Ativ sedan. It is 30 mm (1.2 in) longer and wider than the pre-facelift model. Model grades are J ECO, J, E and G. The facelift model Yaris hatchback comes with standard ABS, 7 SRS airbags, vehicle stability control (VSC) and hill-start assist (HSA) for all trim levels. In November 2019, the Yaris hatchback and Ativ are fitted with the 92 PS (90.7 hp) 3NR-FKE engine. The trim levels are changed to Entry, Mid and High and also include Cross and Ativ GT Edition. The Yaris received a second facelift for the Ativ and hatchback models in late August 2020 in Thailand, with added Toyota Safety Sense suite, Pre-Collision System (PCS) and Lane Departure Alert (LDA) along with redesigned front fascia with dual LED lenses for the range topping Sport and Sport Premium.

In the Philippines, it was released on 20 December 2017 and offered in 1.3 E and 1.5 S trim levels.

The facelifted Yaris hatchback was also launched in South Africa on February 8, 2018. For the first time, the Yaris hatchback for the South African market is imported from Thailand. It replaced the XP130 series Vitz-based Yaris Liftback. Models offered are Xi, XS, Sport and Cross.

The facelifted Yaris hatchback was later launched in Indonesia on February 20, 2018. Trim levels are E, G and TRD Sportivo with either manual transmission or CVT. The mid-level G shares fog lights and 16-inch alloy wheels with the top-of-the-line TRD Sportivo, but still has rear drum brakes. Full body kits, rear solid disc brake, smart engine start/stop button, optitron combination meter, and automatic climate control air-conditioner with digital display are exclusively reserved for the TRD Sportivo.

The XP150 series Yaris hatchback was revealed in Malaysia on April 11, 2019 at the Malaysia Autoshow and launched on April 18, 2019. It is locally assembled at UMW Toyota’s new plant in Bukit Raja, Klang. Trim levels are J, E and G with CVT.

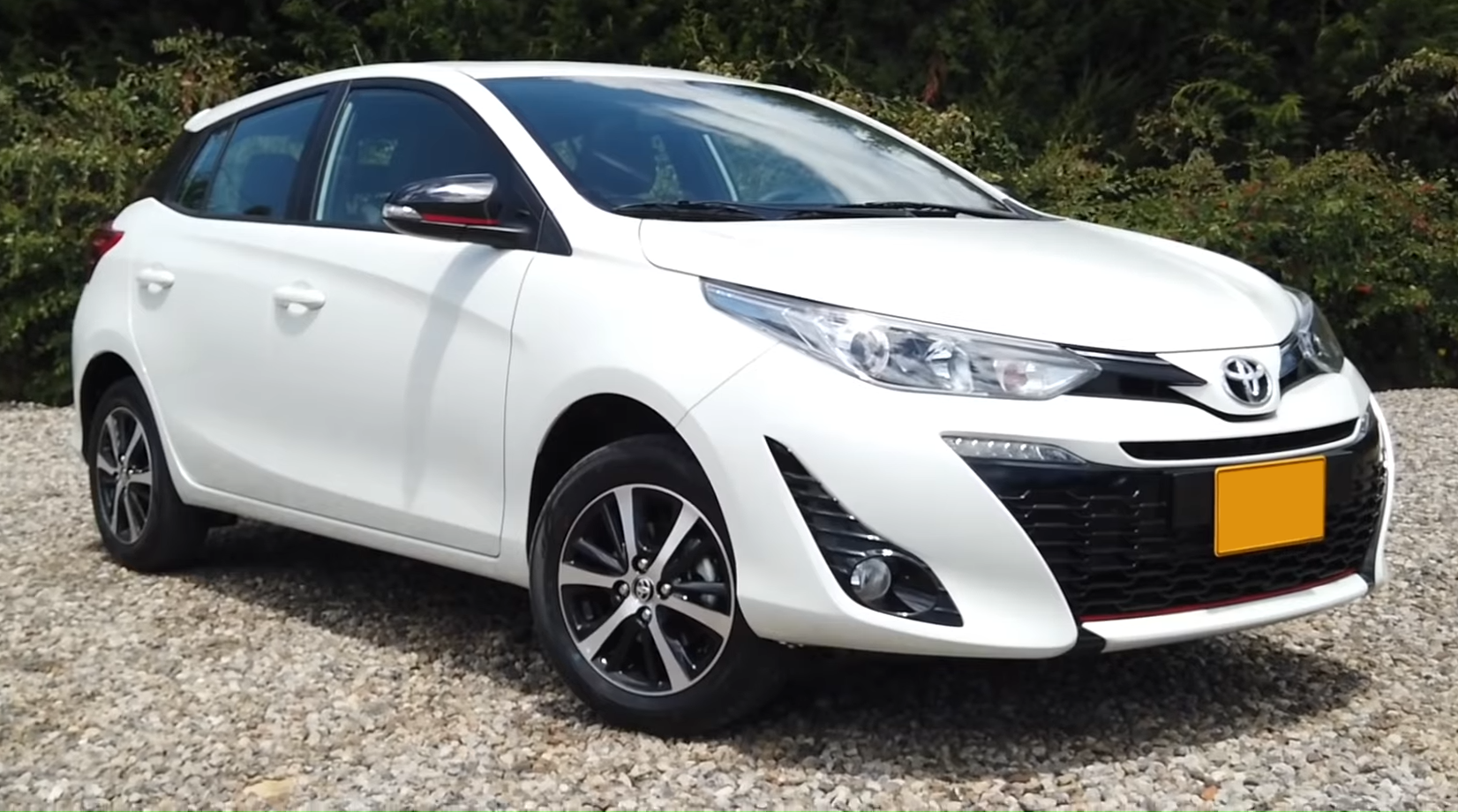
Yaris 1.5 S (NSP151; first facelift, Colombia)

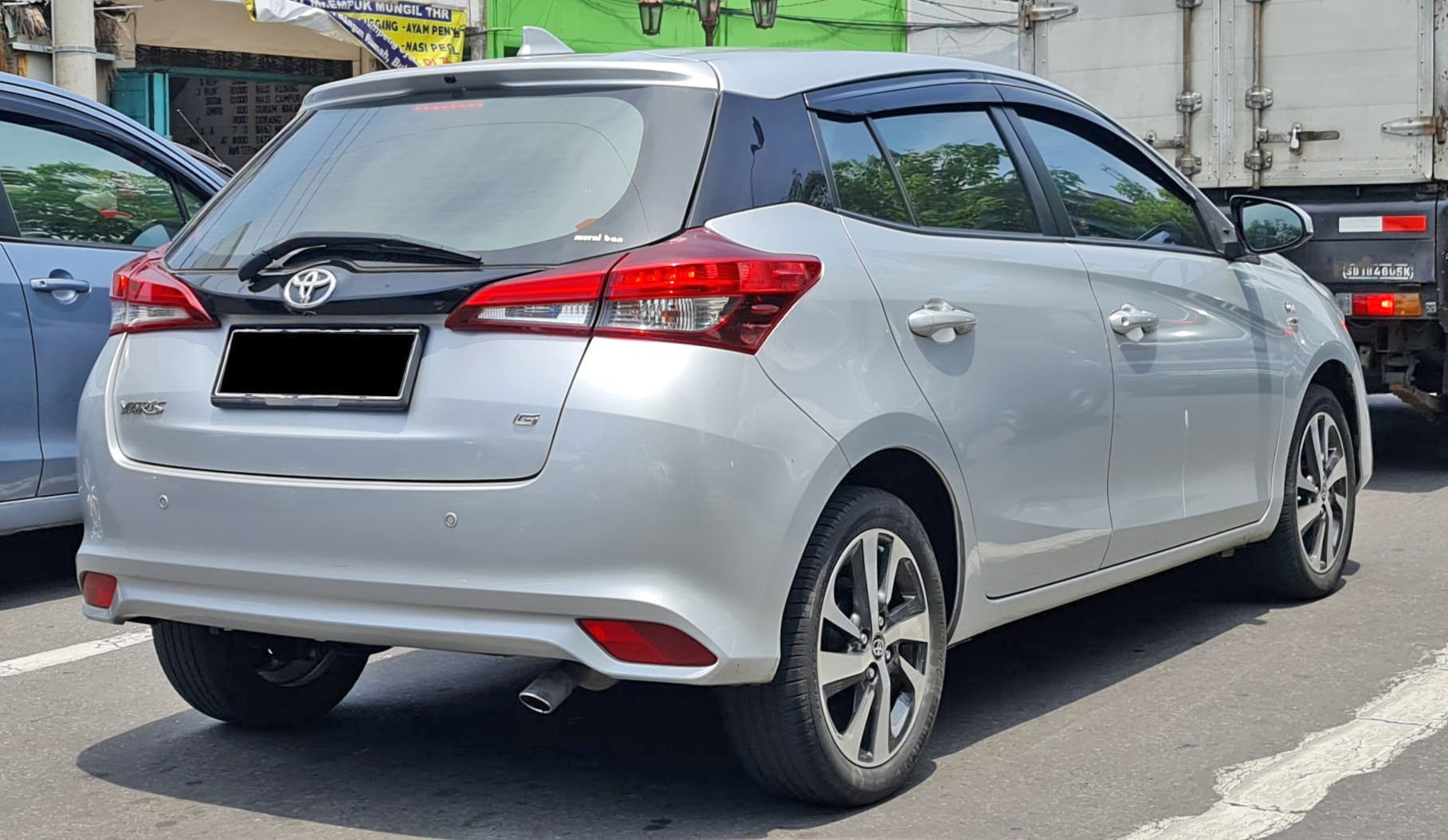
2018 Yaris 1.5 G (NSP151; first facelift, Indonesia)

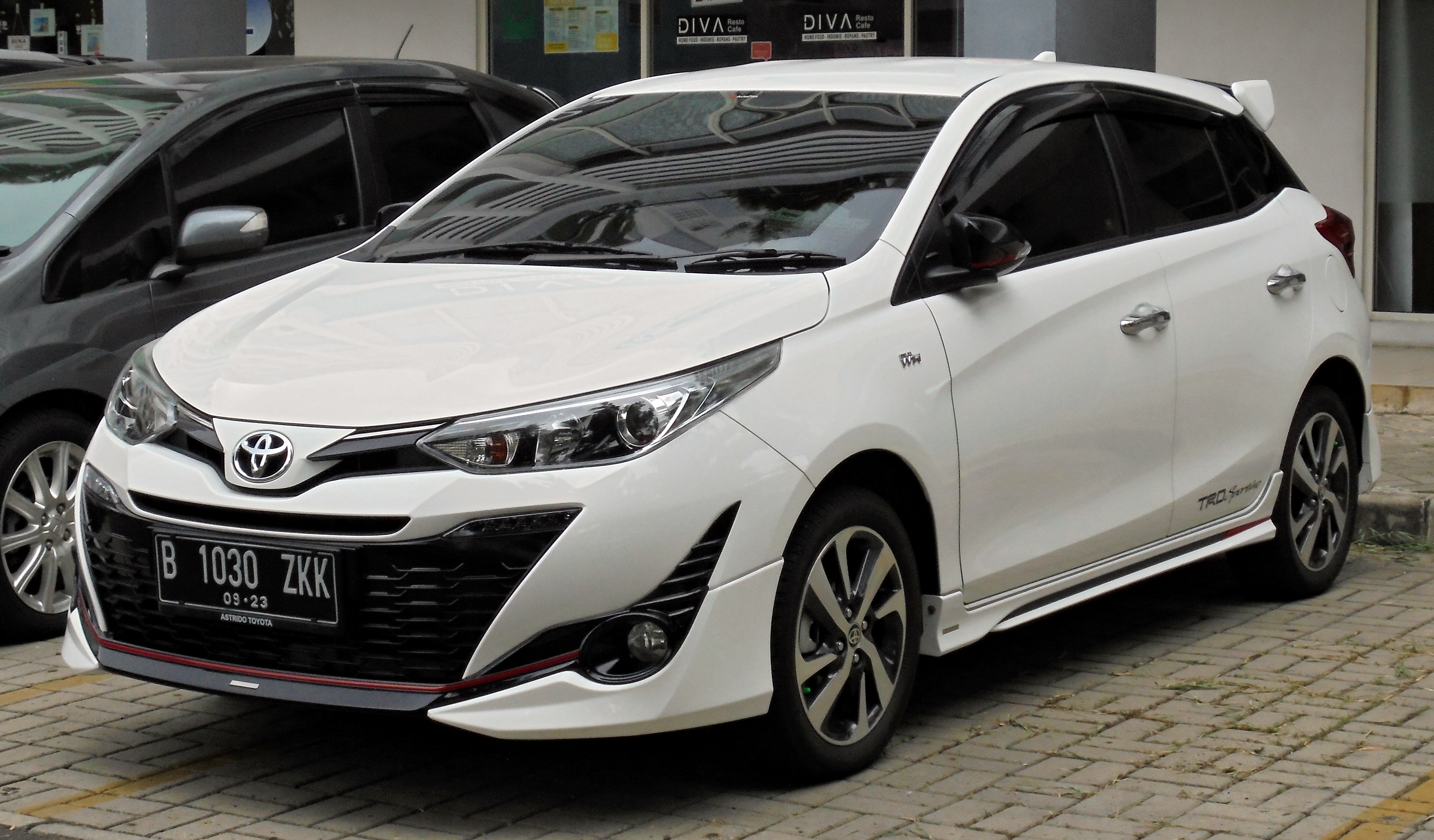
2018 Yaris 1.5 TRD Sportivo (NSP151; first facelift, Indonesia)

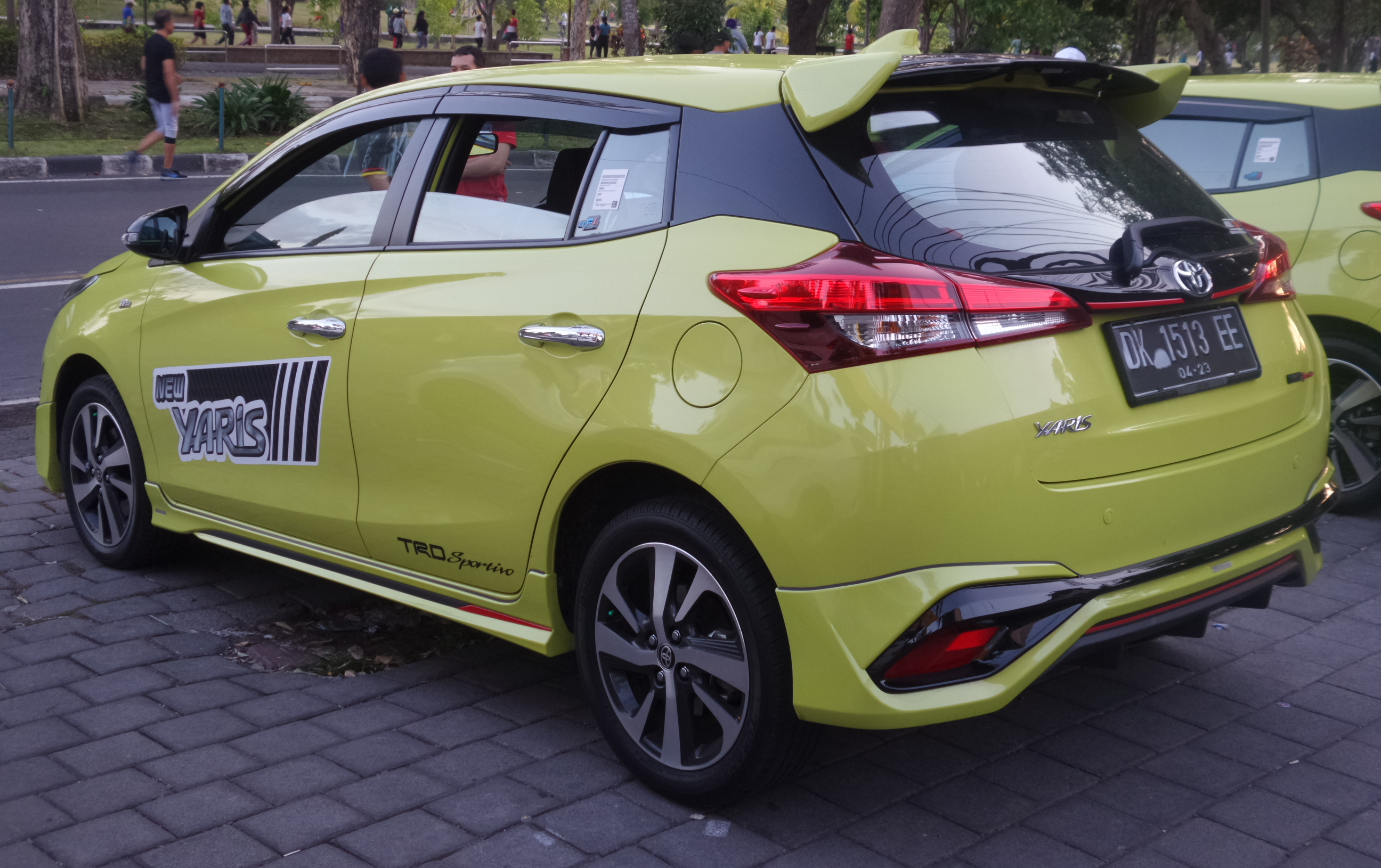
2018 Yaris 1.5 TRD Sportivo (NSP151; first facelift, Indonesia)

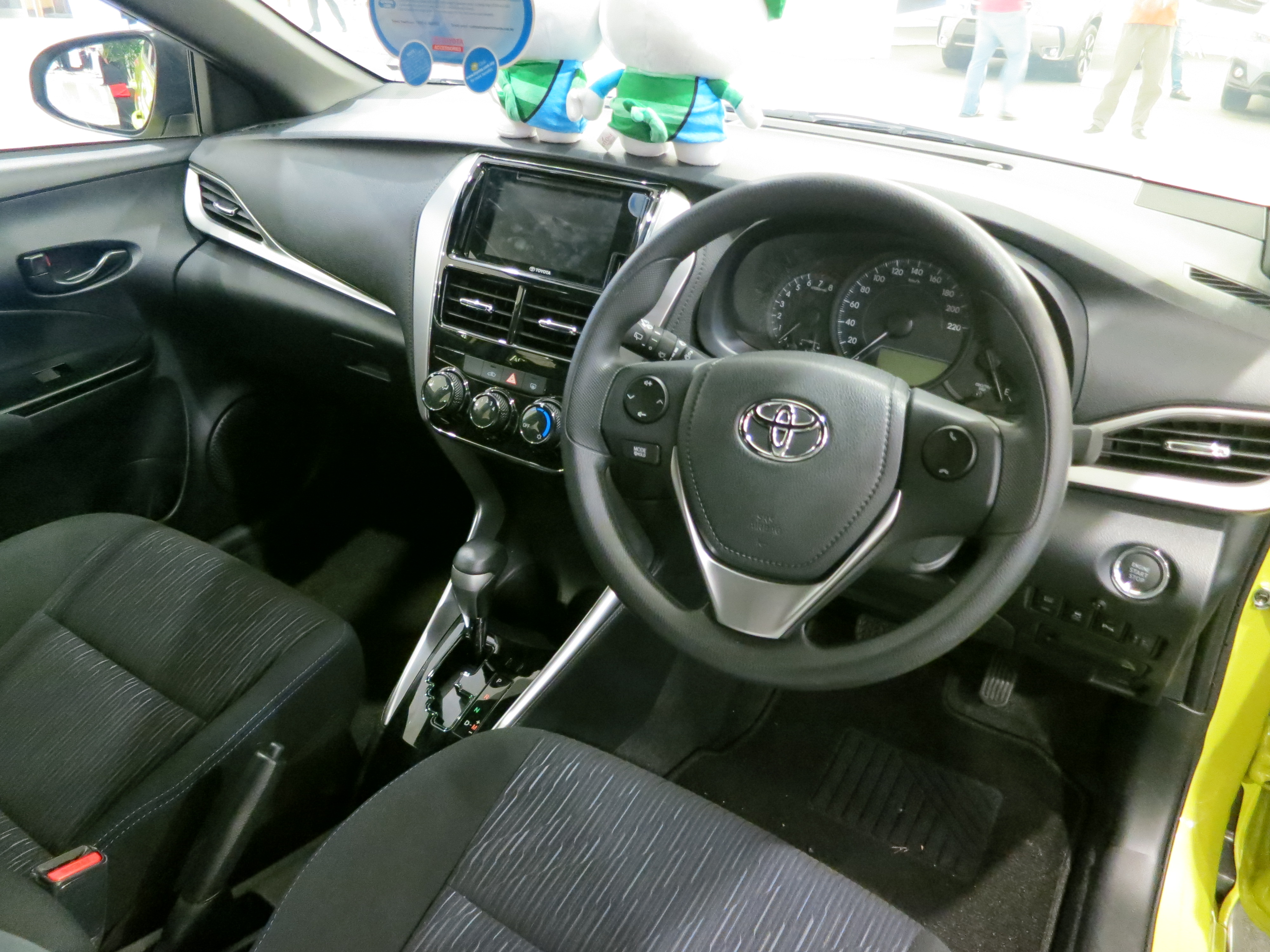
Facelift interior

=== 2020 facelift ===
The Yaris lineup received its second facelift in July 2020 in the Philippines and officially in Thailand in August 2020 with updated front bumper design, LED dual lenses with integrated Daytime running lamps headlamps for the top G/Sport grades and 15-inch rims redesign across the lineup in Thailand.

The second facelift Yaris hatchback was launched in Indonesia on September 8, 2020. The E trim was removed from the lineup, leaving only the G and TRD Sportivo trim levels. On August 9, 2021, the TRD Sportivo trim was renamed to GR Sport. On May 10, 2023, the G trim was also removed as well.

On December 17, 2020, UMW Toyota Motor officially launched the second facelift Yaris for the Malaysian market. The car was introduced via a digital presentation, alongside the 2021 facelift model Vios and the GR Yaris. As before, three variants are available for the Yaris, the base J, E and G. Exterior-wise, the refresh introduces an updated front bumper, which provides the car with a bolder and wider visual stance. The grille and the lower intake are fused into one, and the headlamps use triple bezel LED units, standard across the entire model range. Toyota Safety Sense is available on the E and G variant. The suite consists of a pre-collision system (PCS) with autonomous emergency braking and lane departure alert (LDA), which works from speeds of 50 km/h on to help avoid unintended lane changes. Also on are a blind spot monitor with rear cross traffic alert and a 3D 360-degree panoramic view monitor, on top of the usual VSC, hill-start assist control and seven airbags. Additionally, the E and G come fitted with a front digital video recorder.

On December 23, 2020, TMP launched the second facelift Yaris for the Philippine market. The Yaris features the same front fascia as the second facelift Vios with the 1.3 E trim having LED front foglamps while the 1.5 S received LED headlamps and fog lamps. Both trims feature a redesigned two-tone 15-inch alloy wheels and blacked out trunk lid connecting the tail lights. Interior changes include leather seats for the S trim. The manual transmission variant was dropped from the lineup. Both the E and S trims are only equipped with the CVT. Apple CarPlay and Android Auto became standard on both trims as well as Smart Device Link.

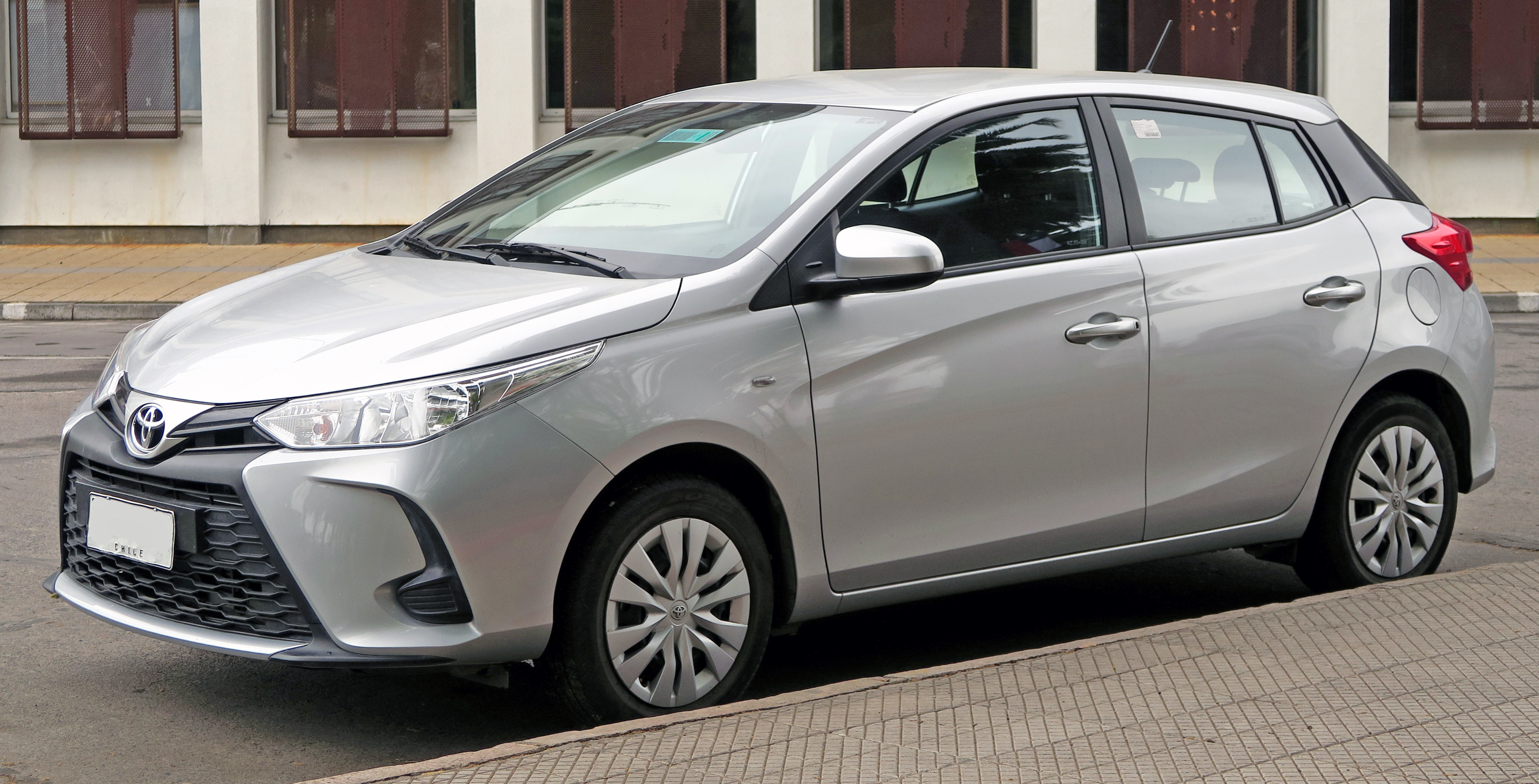
2023 Yaris Sport 1.5 E (NSP151, second facelift, Colombia)

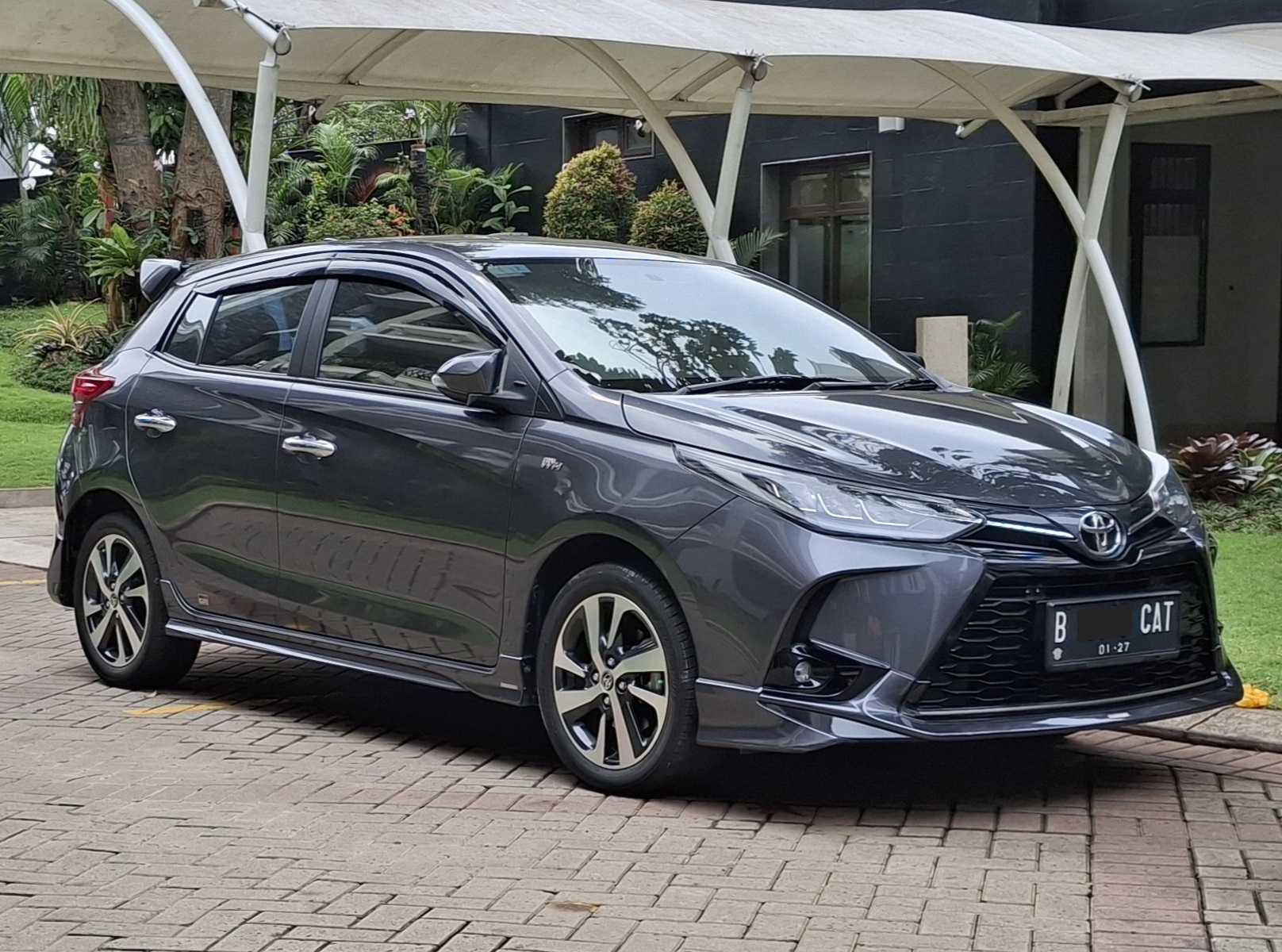
2021 Yaris 1.5 GR Sport (NSP151; second facelift, Indonesia)

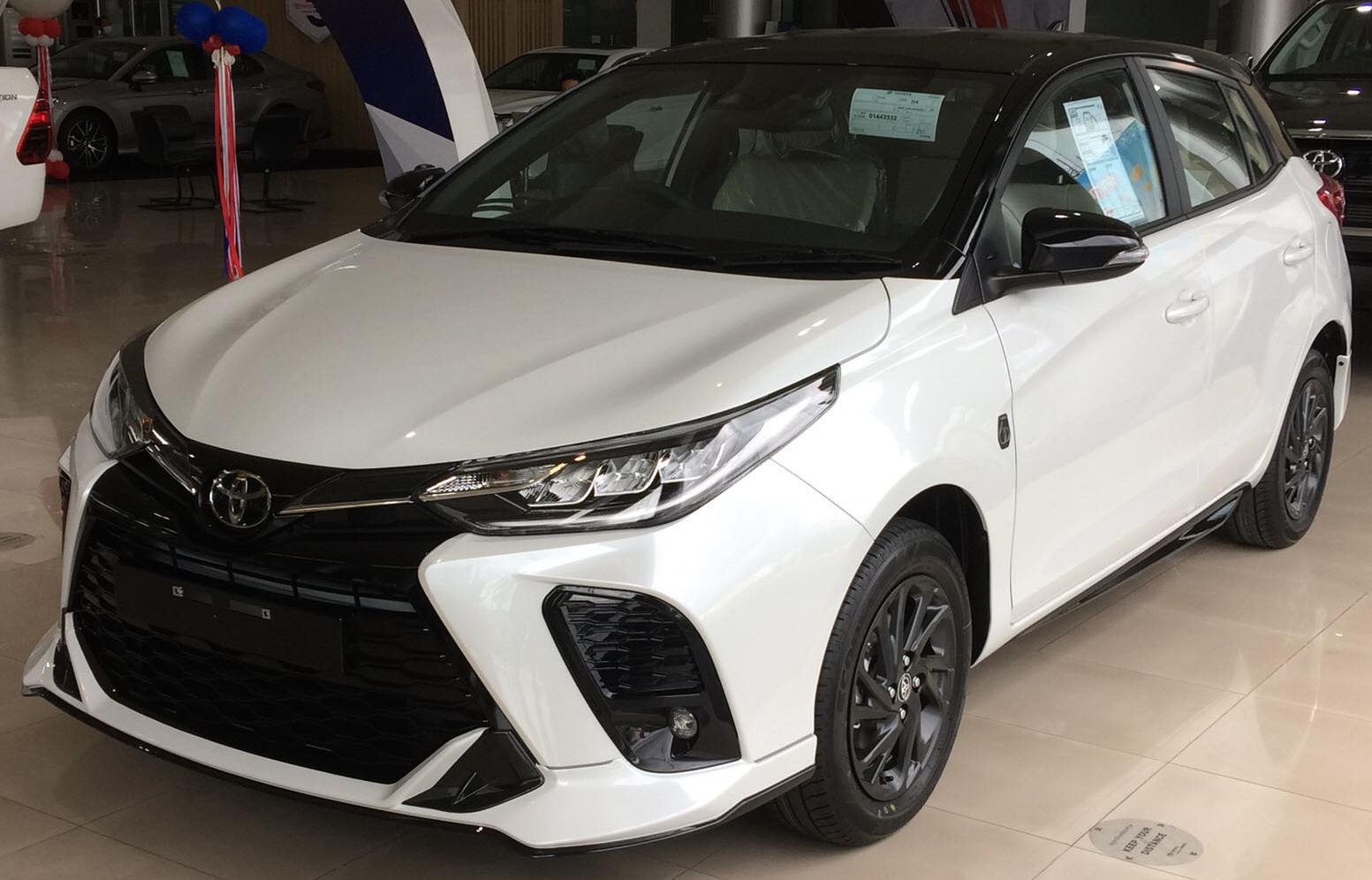
2022 Yaris Sport Premium 60th Anniversary (NSP152; second facelift, Thailand)

=== 2023 facelift ===
The Thai market Yaris hatchback received its third facelift on March 9, 2023 with 4 grade levels: Sport, Smart, Premium and Premium S. The front fascia incorporated Toyota's hammerhead design language. It continued to be powered by the 1.2-litre 3NR-FKE engine. Advanced driver-assistance systems package branded as Toyota Safety Sense is standard on Premium and Premium S grades.

The facelifted Yaris went on sale in Malaysia on 16 November 2026.

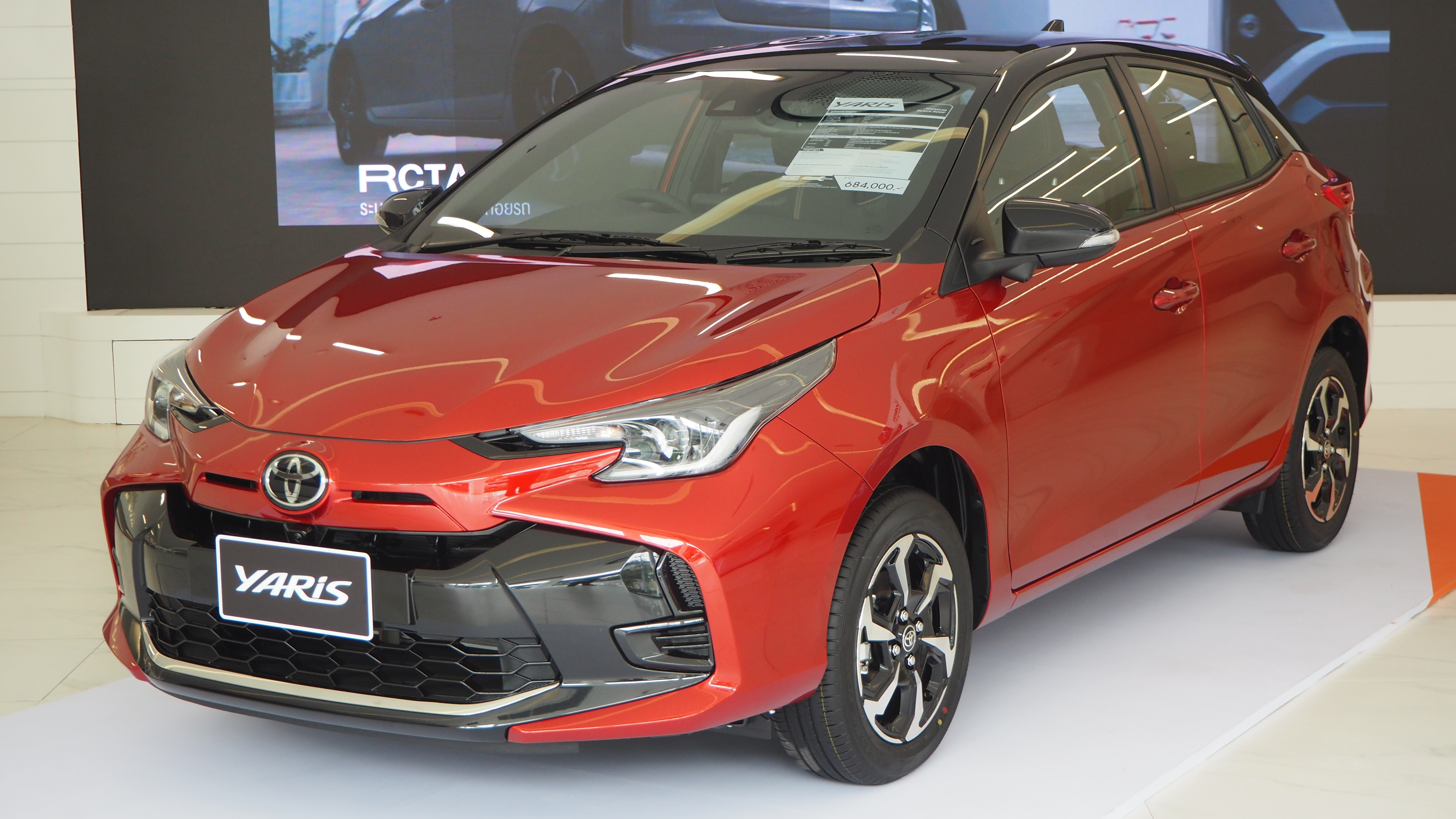
2023 Yaris Premium (NSP152; third facelift, Thailand)

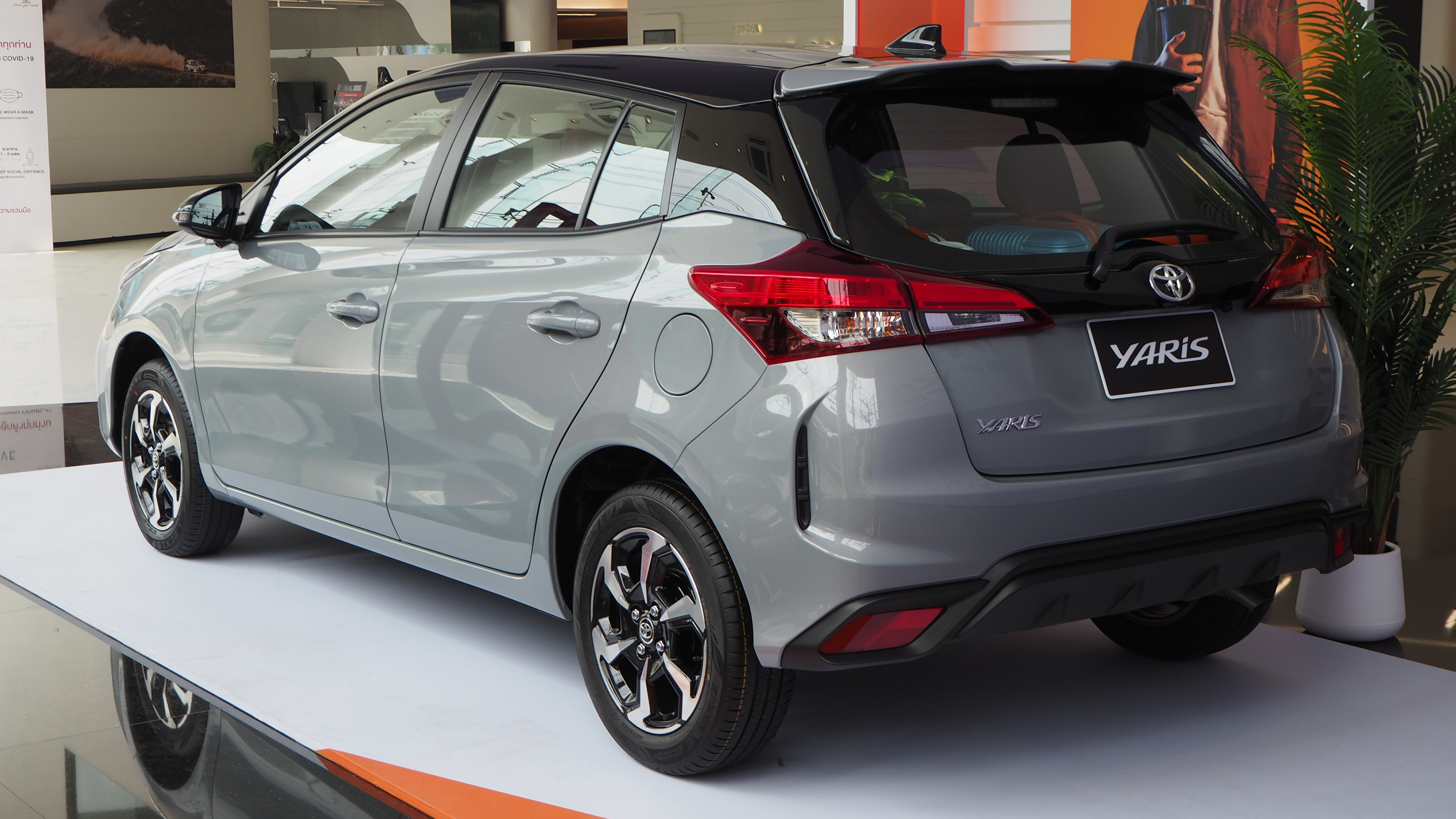
2023 Yaris Premium S (NSP152; third facelift, Thailand)

== Yaris Ativ ==
The Yaris Ativ sedan was launched in Thailand on August 15, 2017, using the same 1.2-litre 3NR-FE engine as the Thai market XP150 series Yaris hatchback paired to a Super CVT-i automatic transmission, with updated bodywork and interior styling (later used in the facelifted regular Yaris). The Yaris Ativ is positioned below the Vios in its sedan lineup in Thailand and uses a new model codename NSP152. The Yaris Ativ received its facelift together with its Yaris hatchback twin in late August 2020. Its lineup were revised to Entry, Sport and Sport Premium along with a new color called Grayish Blue Metallic.

The Yaris Ativ uses the XP150 series Vios platform and roof, but with the front end design cues from the facelifted Yaris hatchback and its own redesigned rear fascia. For the interior, it receives added features such as 7 airbags, revised dashboard, speedometer design and convenience features such as the shifting of cup holders to reside behind the gearshift, door pockets for the rear doors, centre cabin lights, reverse camera mount, "Follow-Me Home" delayed headlight dimming and Blind Spot Monitoring for some markets.

=== Southeast Asia ===
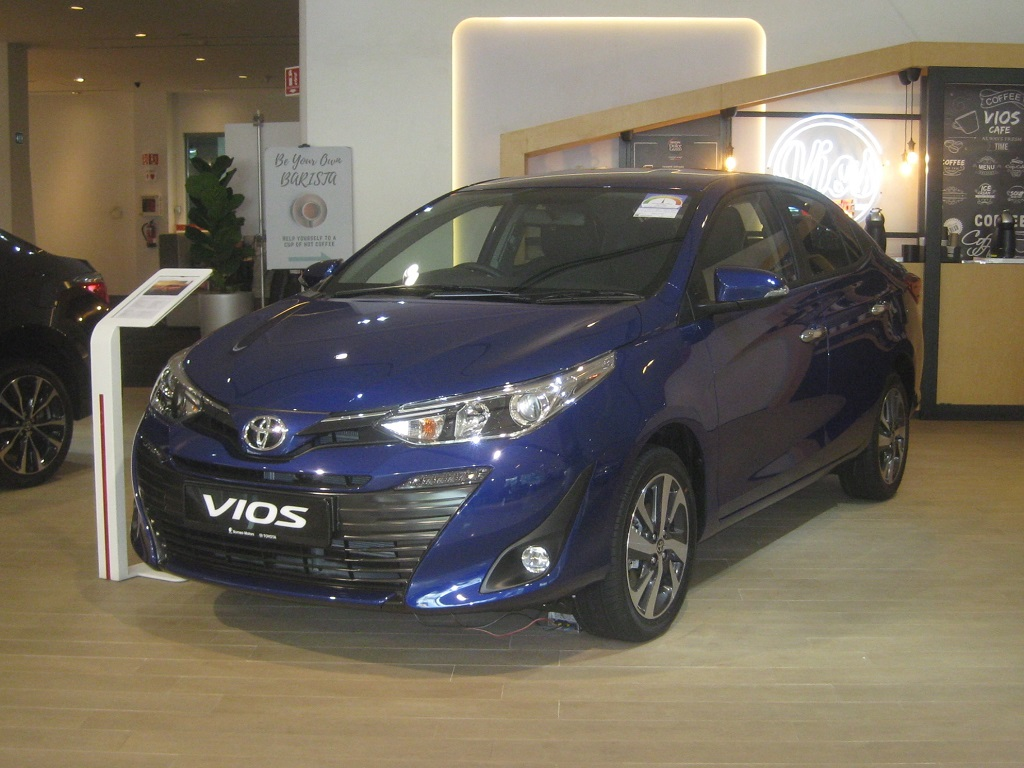
The Thai-built Yaris Ativ sold in Singapore as the Vios

The Yaris Ativ was later released in other Southeast Asian countries as a 2018 model to replace the pre-facelift third generation Vios sold at that time. It was launched in Singapore on December 14, 2017 as the Vios naming instead of Yaris Ativ, albeit with a larger 1.5-litre 2NR-FE engine. It is offered in E and G grades with 7-speed CVT. It was also unveiled in India as the Yaris sedan on February 7, 2018 at the Auto Expo 2018. For the Indonesian market, it was launched on April 3, 2018. The Indonesian market Yaris Ativ-based Vios is locally assembled at the Karawang plant, and several other Asian countries follow the equipment lineup offered in Indonesia. Meanwhile, in Brunei, the Yaris Ativ-based Vios was launched in May 2018, following the facelifted Yaris Hatchback. The Yaris Ativ-based Vios was also launched in the Philippines on July 19, 2018 and in Malaysia on November 22, 2018 at the Kuala Lumpur International Motor Show. It received a mild facelift in the Philippines in July 2020, featuring redesigned bumper fascia and new double LED lenses for the headlamp on the G model. The Yaris Ativ made its official facelift debut in Thailand in August 2020, with Toyota Safety Sense available in its higher Sport Premium trim.

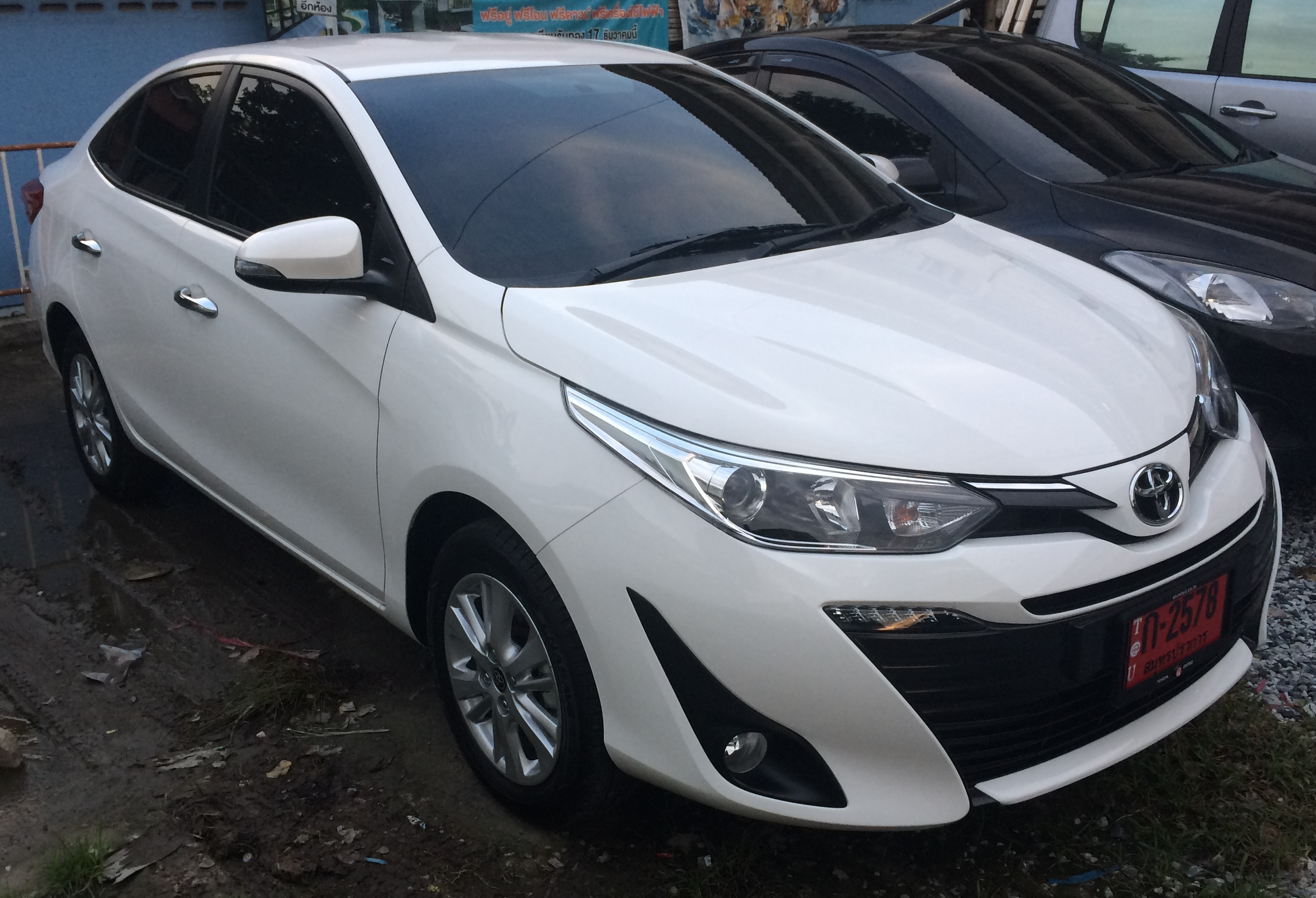
2017 Yaris Ativ 1.2 G (NSP152, Thailand)

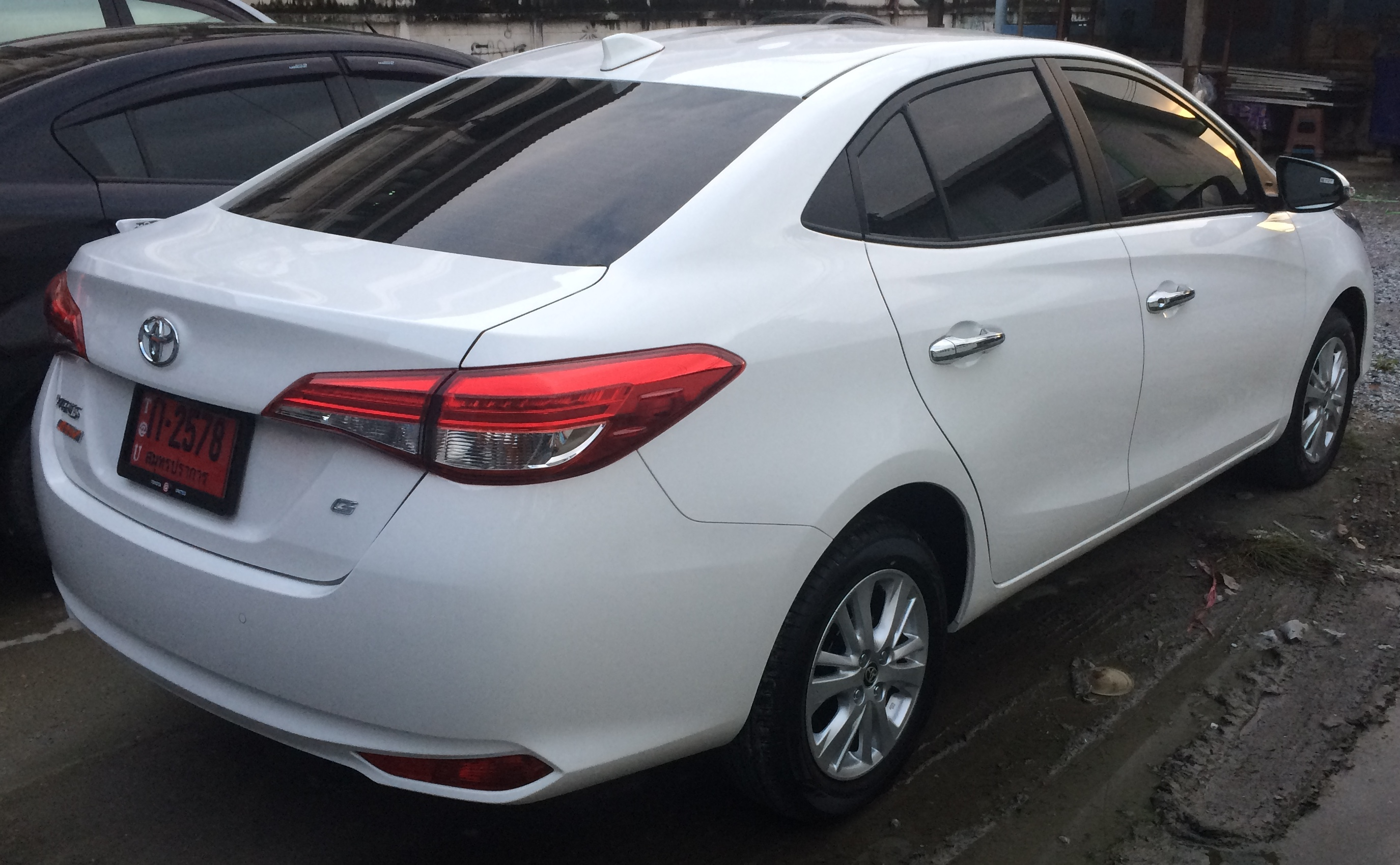
2017 Yaris Ativ 1.2 G (NSP152, Thailand)

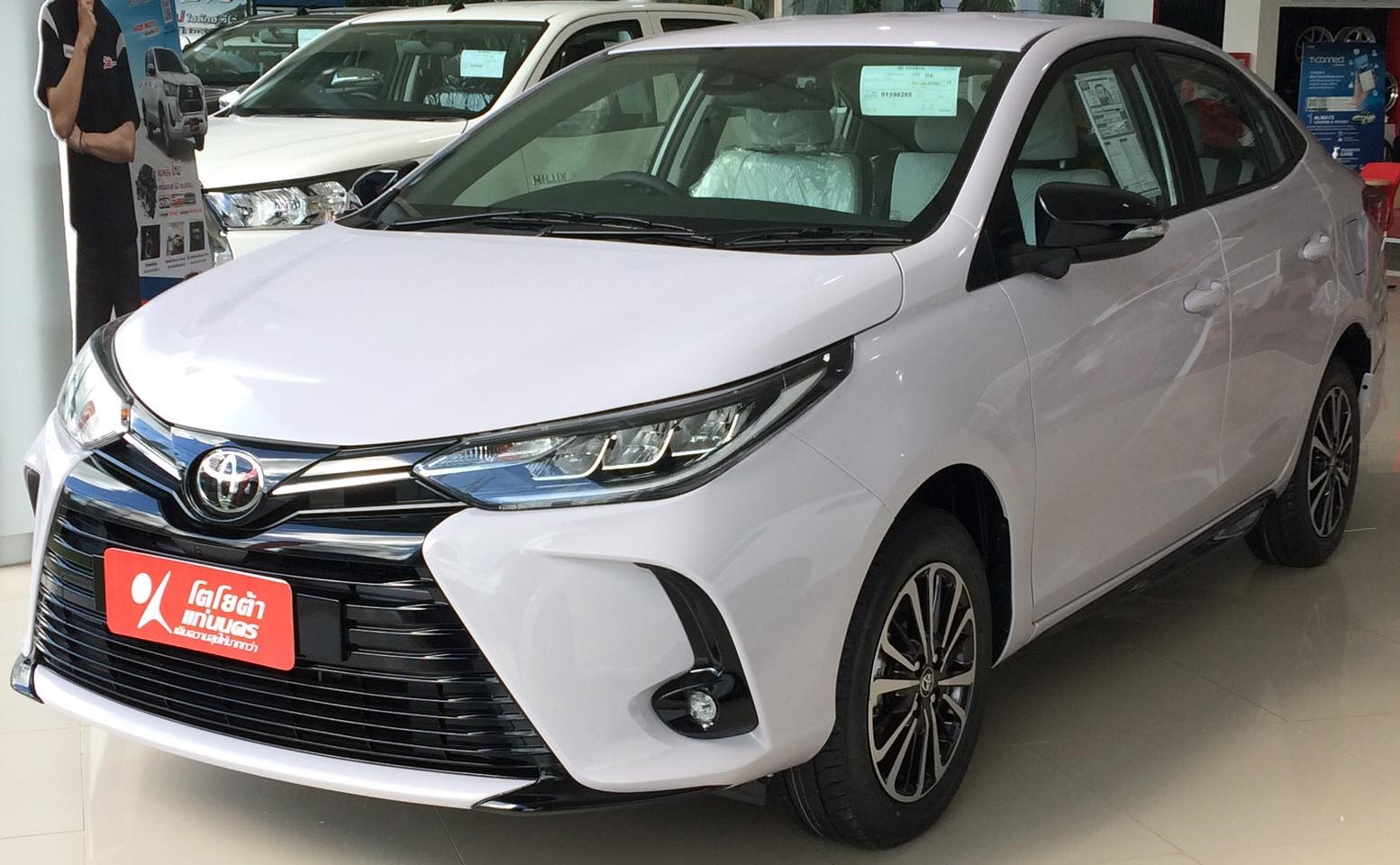
2021 Yaris Ativ Sport Premium Play Limited Edition (NSP152, Thailand)

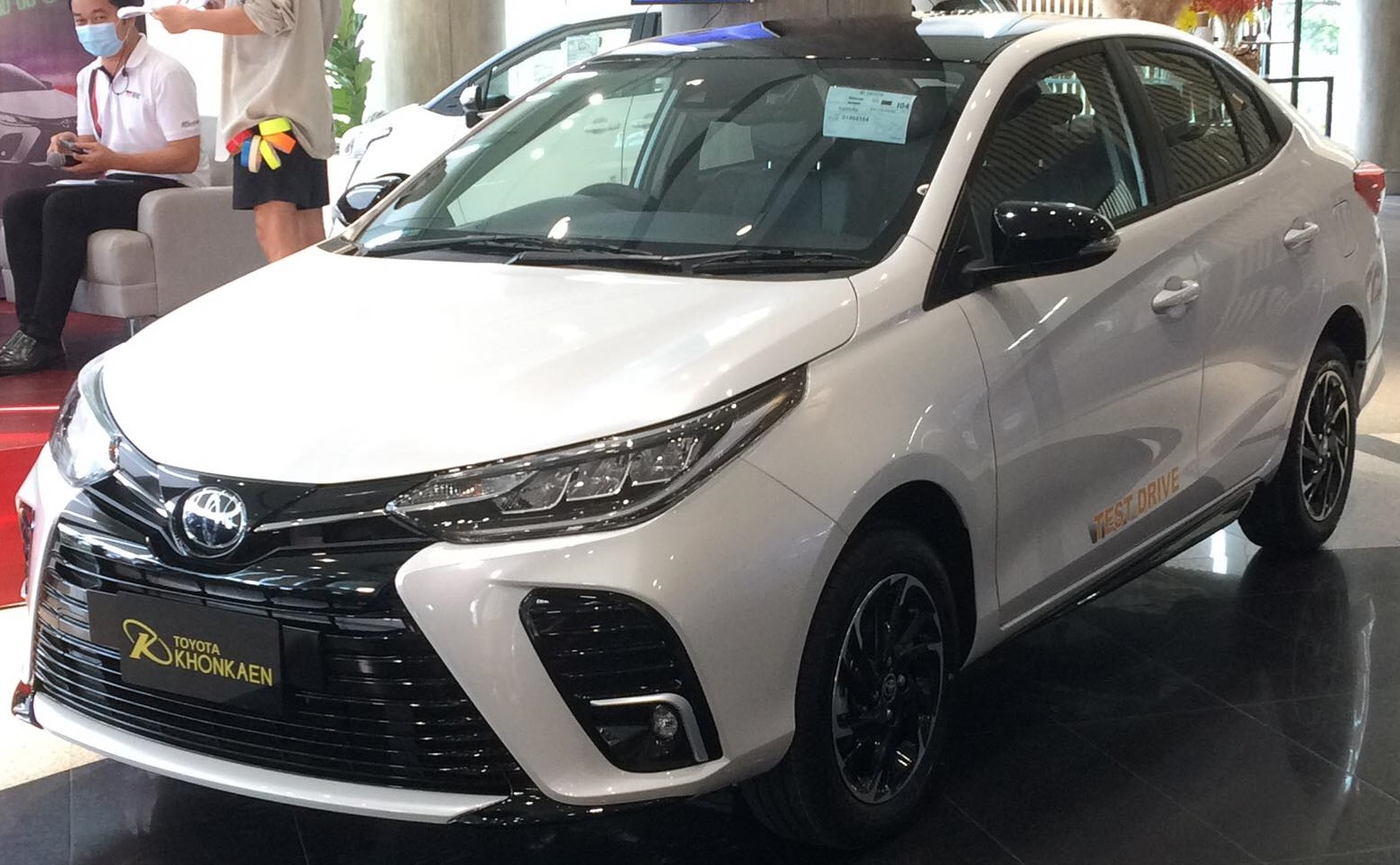
2021 Yaris Ativ Sport Premium (NSP152, Thailand)

=== Global markets ===
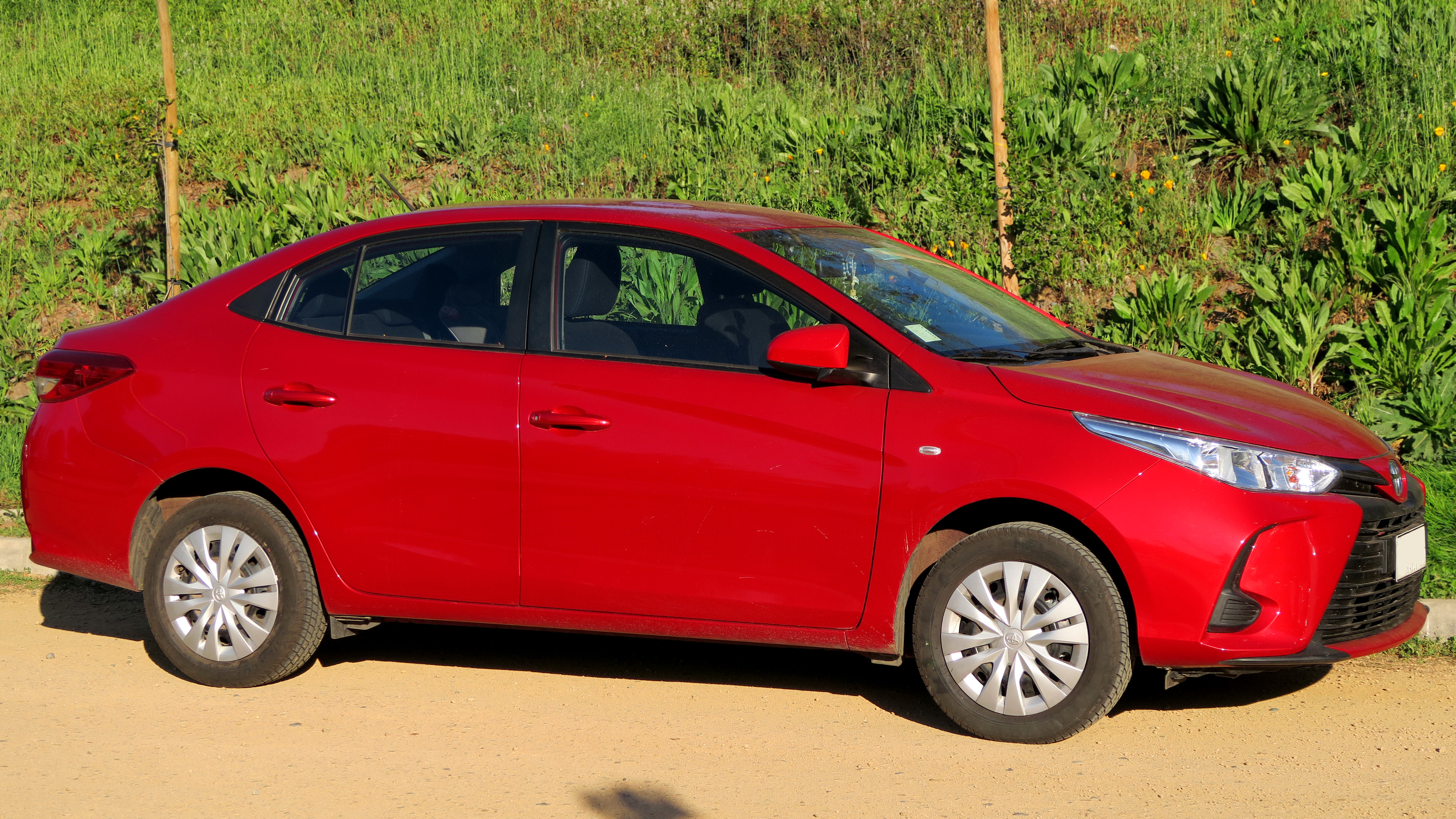
Facelift Toyota Yaris Sedan 1.5 E (NSP151, Chile)

For the general export markets, the Yaris Ativ is simply called Yaris sedan. It is sold in some Middle East and Latin American countries. In Costa Rica, it is marketed as the Yaris Advance. In Mexico, the Yaris sedan was sold alongside the Mazda 2-based Yaris R. Model grades for the Mexican Yaris sedan were Core and S. The S has red accent on the lower grille, and door mirrors, red "S" emblem on the trunk, and red stitching on the steering wheel.

The facelift model Yaris Sedan for the Latin American markets has the same fascia as the facelifted Vios sold in Asia.

For the Brazilian market, the locally built Yaris sedan is offered in XL, XL Plus, XS and XLS model grades. The XL can be purchased with either manual transmission or CVT, while the XL Plus, XS and sunroof-equipped XLS are only offered with CVT. The 2NR-FBE powered Brazilian Yaris can run on either petrol or ethanol. For the facelift model, the XL with manual gearbox was discontinued. Toyota Safety Sense (TSS) came standard on the XS and XLS. Paddle shifter and Multi-Information Display (MID) are only for the XLS.

The Yaris sedan lineup in Argentina initially came as manual only XL and a choice of manual or CVT in the XLS. For the facelift model, the line up was revised with the XLS manual and CVT, and the fully loaded CVT only XLS Pack. The XLS Pack got standard TSS, MID, paddle shifter, and 16-inch alloy wheels.

Although the new DNGA-based AC100 Yaris has been launched in some Central and South American countries, as of 2024, the Brazilian-manufactured XP150 models are still offered in Argentina, Brazil, and Uruguay. Production of the Yaris sedan in Brazil stopped at the end of 2024.

In India, the Yaris sedan was launched during the 14th Auto Expo in February 2018 and marketed from May of the same year. It was badged as the Yaris, and came with a 1.5-litre petrol engine that produces 106 hp. The car was available in J, G, V and VX trim levels. All trim levels are available with choice of either a 6-speed manual transmission or CVT. Rear disc brakes are standard on the V and VX. The Indian VX model came standard with electric driver seat adjustment, ceiling-mounted rear passenger AC and rear sunshade. Toyota India skipped the E model grade, but the Indian G is roughly the equivalent of the Vios E in the South Asian market, while the Indian Yaris V is similarly equipped to the Vios G. In September 2021, Toyota India officially discontinued the Yaris from the Indian market.

The Yaris sedan was launched in Pakistan in March 2020 as a locally assembled model. It is available in three variants with two engine options, 1.3-litre 1NR-FE and 1.5-litre 2NR-FE. The model grades are 1.3 GLi, 1.3 Ativ, and 1.5 Ativ X. Initially all models were offered with either 5-speed manual or simulated 7-speed CVT. In 2024, the 1.5 Ativ X with manual transmission was discontinued.

=== Safety ===
The Yaris in its most basic Latin American market configuration with 2 airbags and ESC received 2 stars for adult occupants and 4 stars for toddlers from Latin NCAP 2.0 in 2019.

The Brazilian or Thai-made Yaris in its most basic Latin American market configuration with 2 airbags and ESC received 1 star from Latin NCAP 3.0 in 2021 (similar to Euro NCAP 2014).

== Crossover-inspired variants ==
Together with the updated standard Yaris, Toyota Astra Motor in Indonesia introduced the crossover-inspired variant, marketed as Yaris Heykers in late 2016. It came with different front and rear bumper designs, the addition of black overfenders, roof side ornaments and TRD coil springs. It was discontinued in January 2018 with 7,346 units sold.

After the production of the Yaris Heykers in Indonesia discontinued, Toyota in South Africa, Taiwan, Thailand, Brazil and China offers the similar concept to the Yaris Heykers, called the Yaris Cross/Crossover/X Way/X-Urban, which is based on the facelifted regular Yaris hatchback, while the Chinese-market Yaris L X is based on Chinese facelift model of the Yaris L.

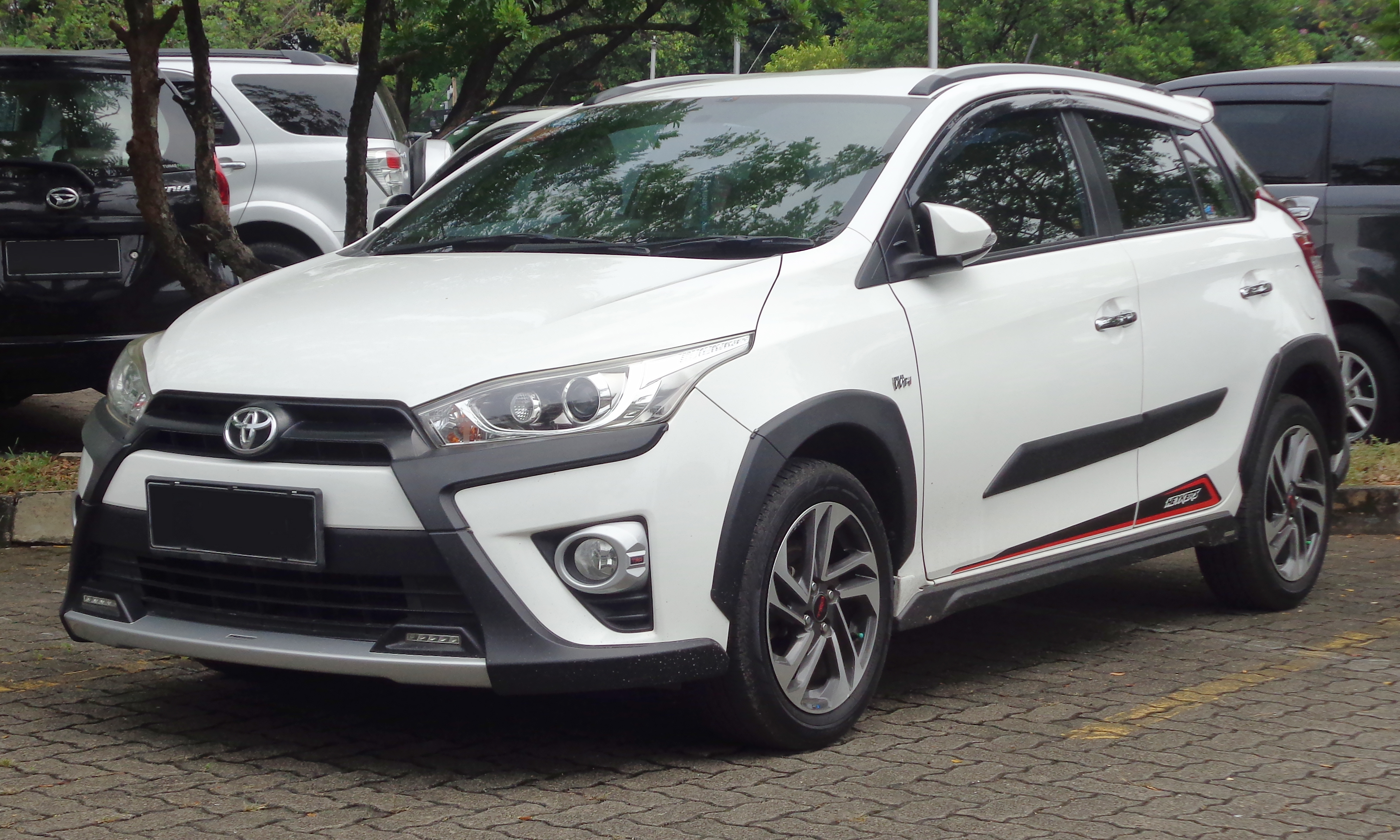
2018 Yaris 1.5 TRD Sportivo Heykers (NSP151, Indonesia)

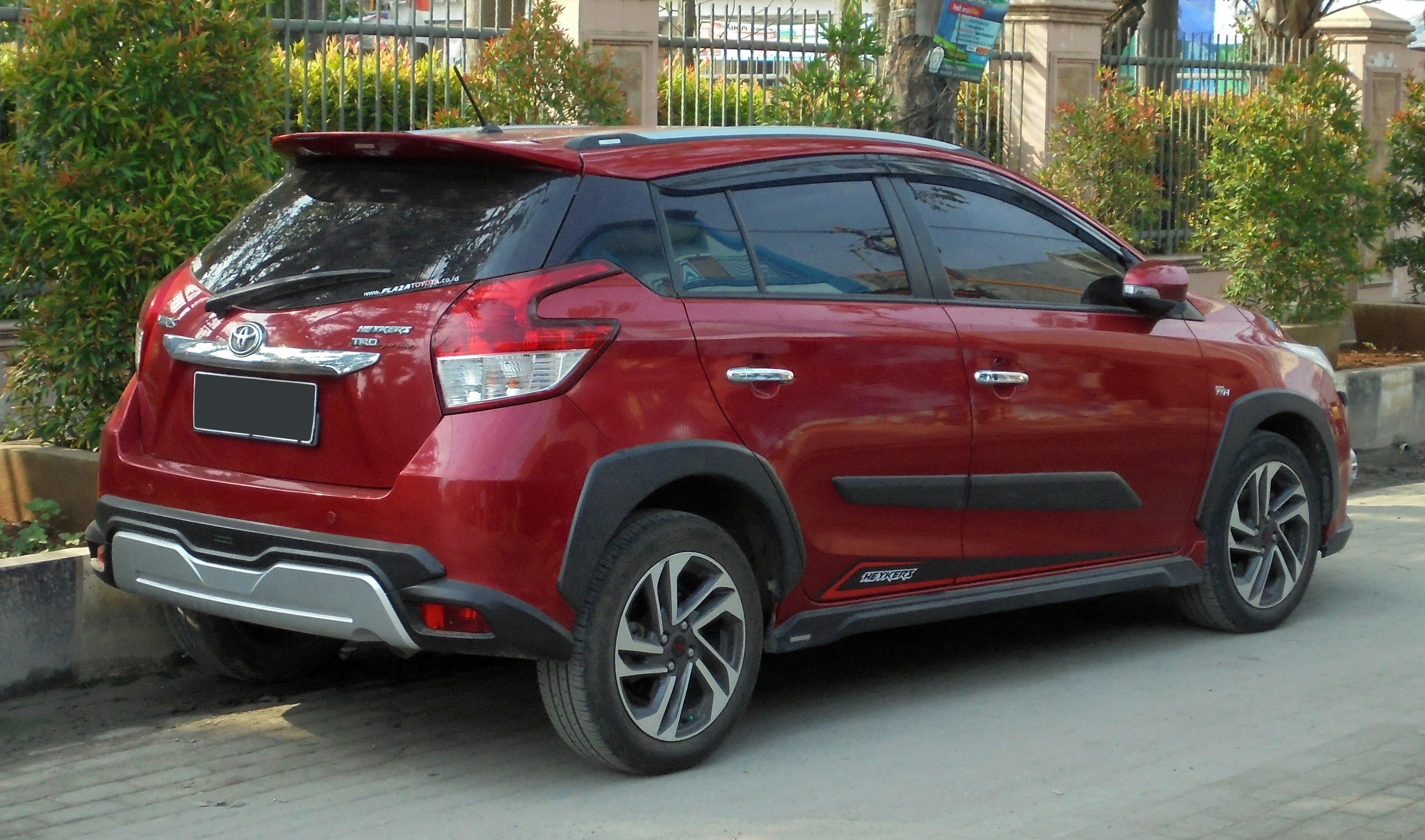
2017 Yaris 1.5 TRD Sportivo Heykers (NSP151, Indonesia)

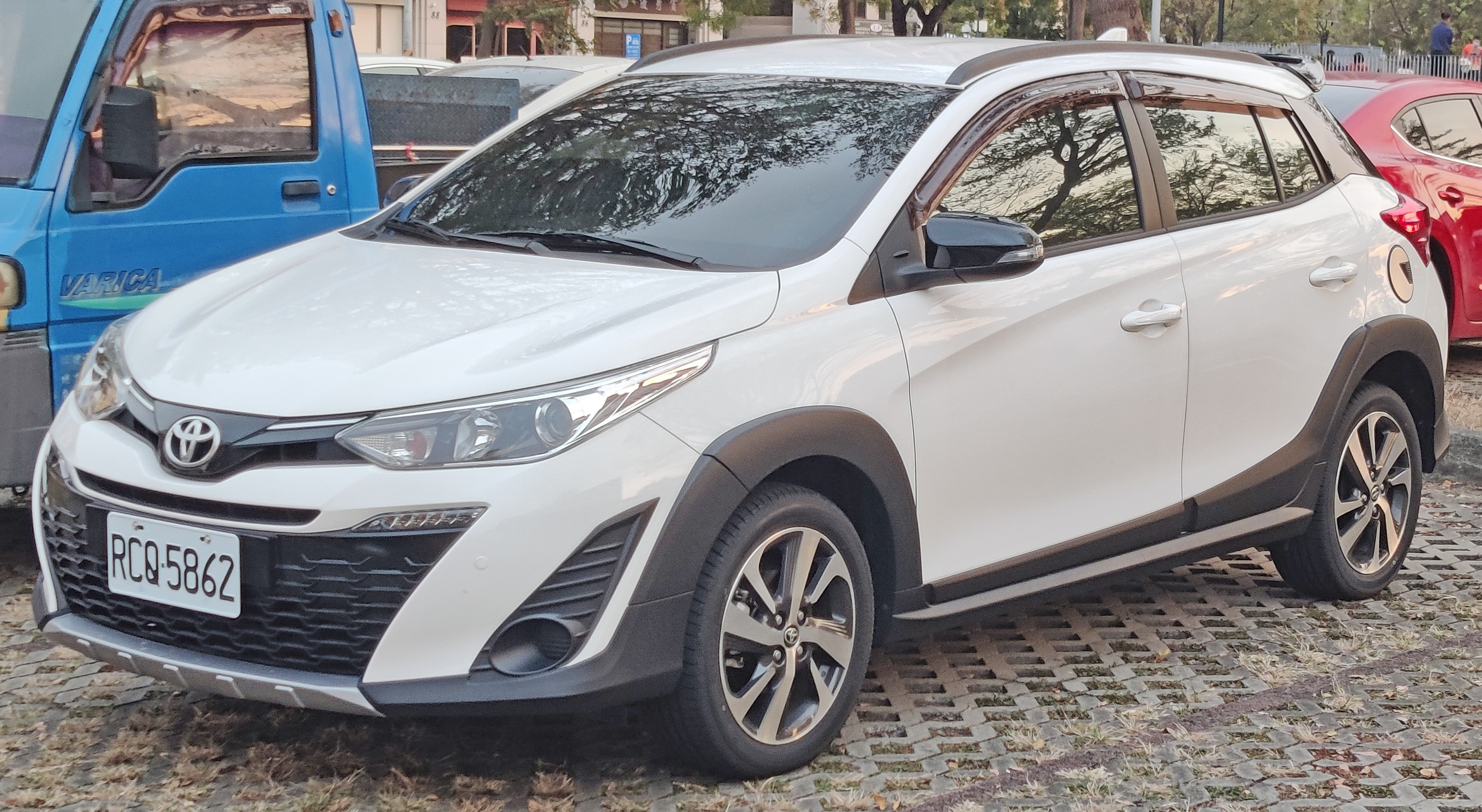
2018 Yaris Crossover (Taiwan)

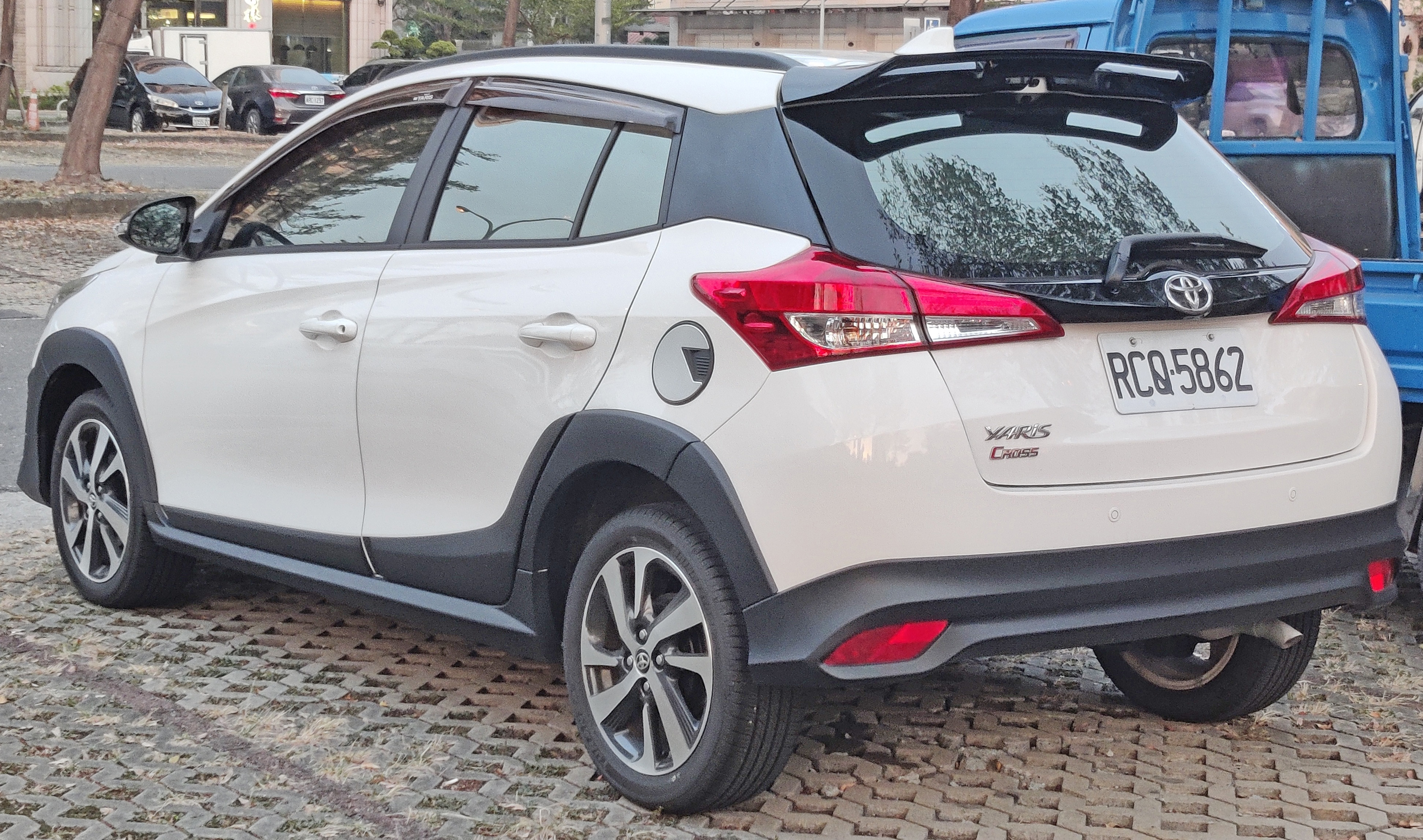
2018 Yaris Crossover (Taiwan)

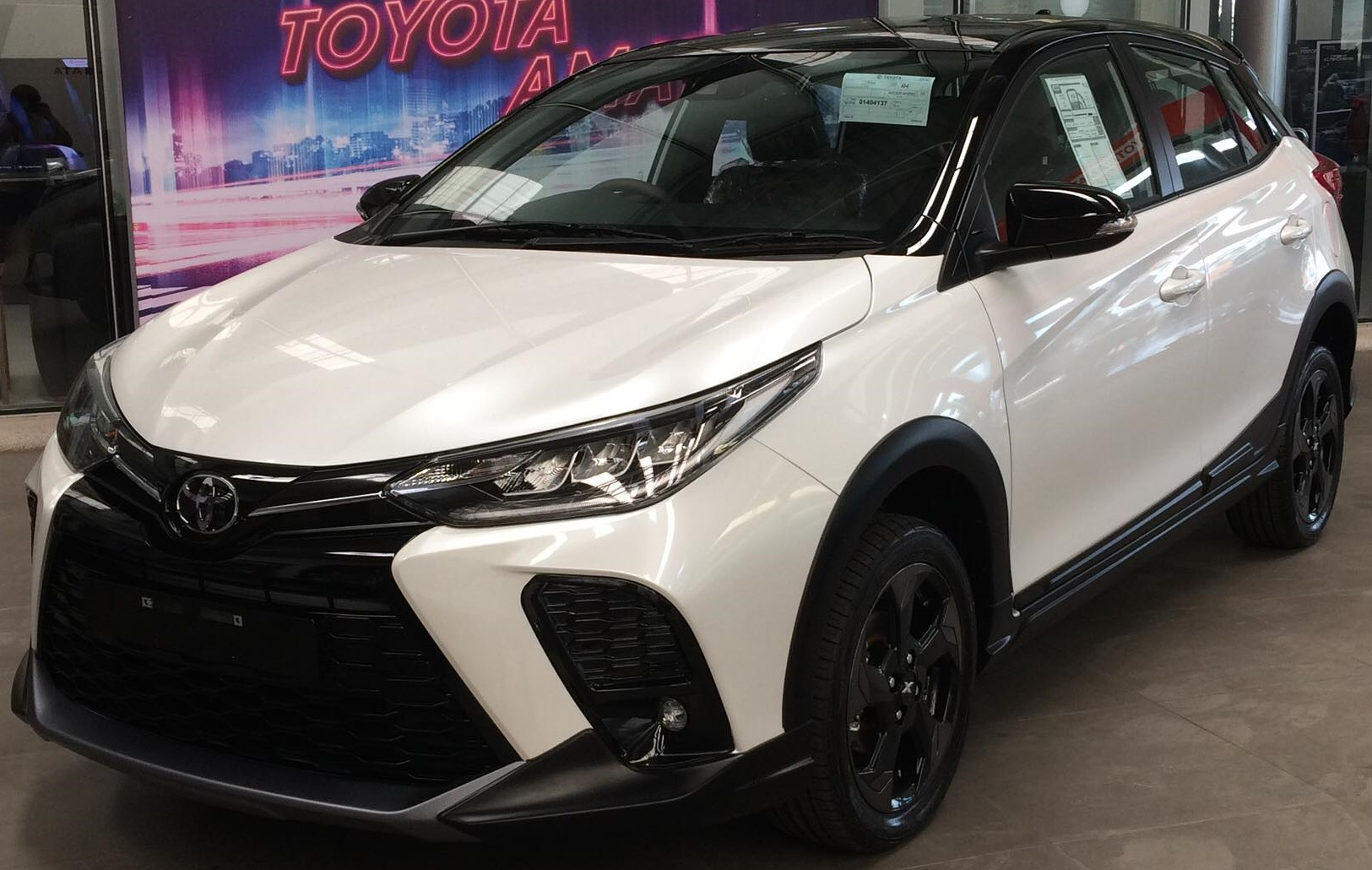
2021 Yaris X-Urban (Thailand)

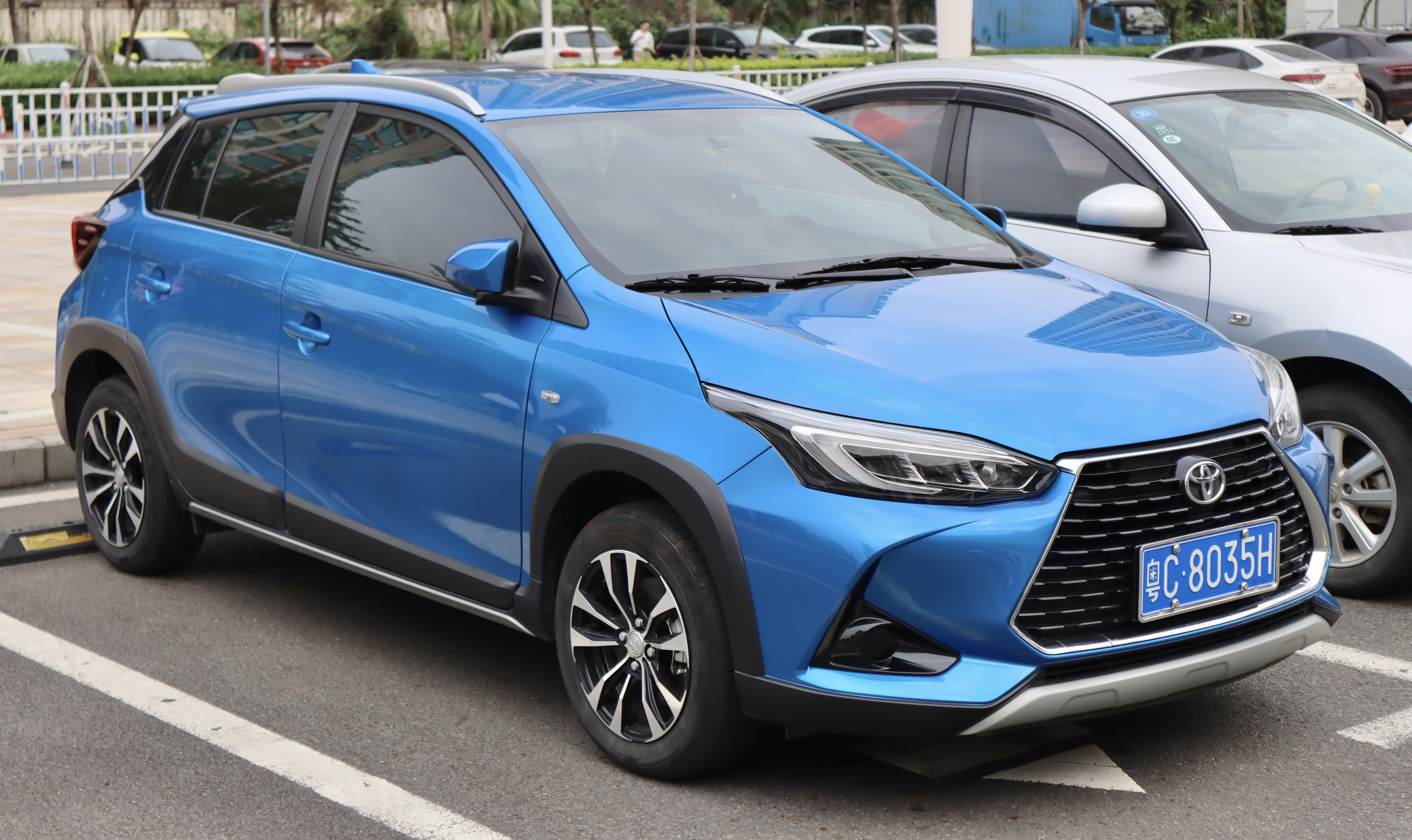
Yaris L X (China)

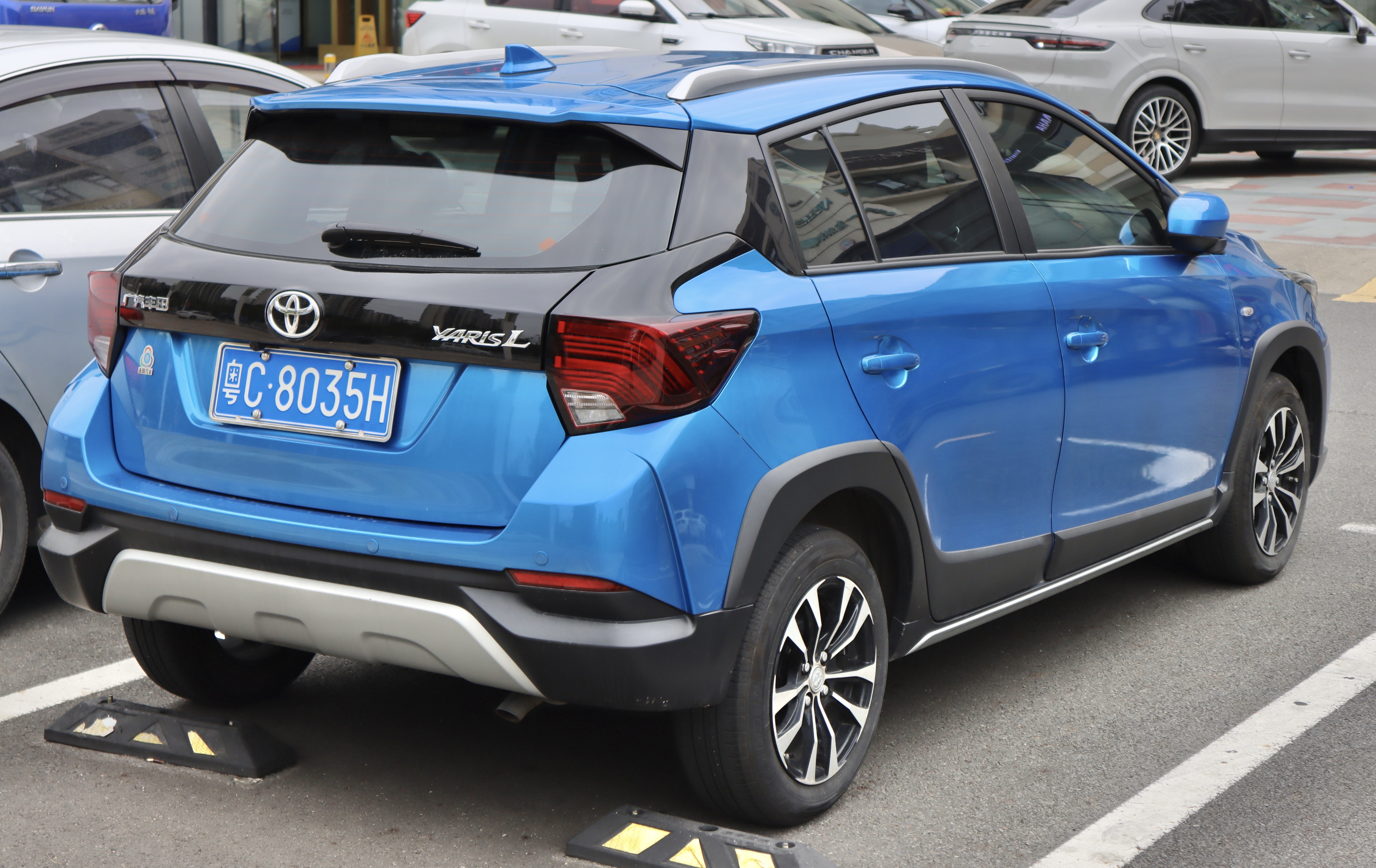
Yaris L X (China)

== Yaris Legian ==
The Yaris Legian is a concept convertible based on the pre-facelift XP150 series Yaris hatchback which was shown at the 23rd Gaikindo Indonesia International Auto Show in August 2015. It is similar in concept to the XP10 series Yaris hatchback-based Yaris Cabrio concept car that was presented at the March 2000 Geneva Motor Show.

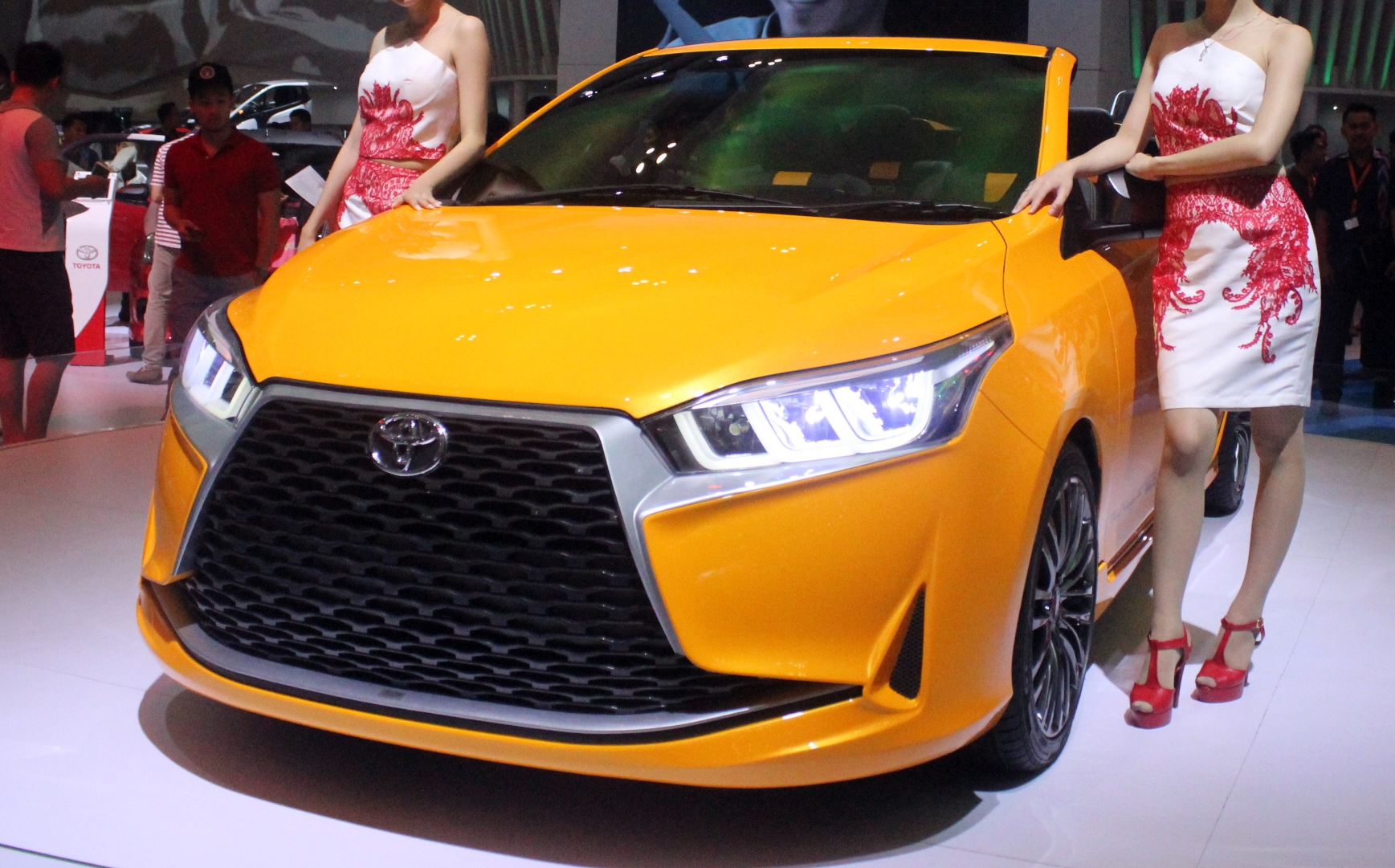
Yaris Legian (front)

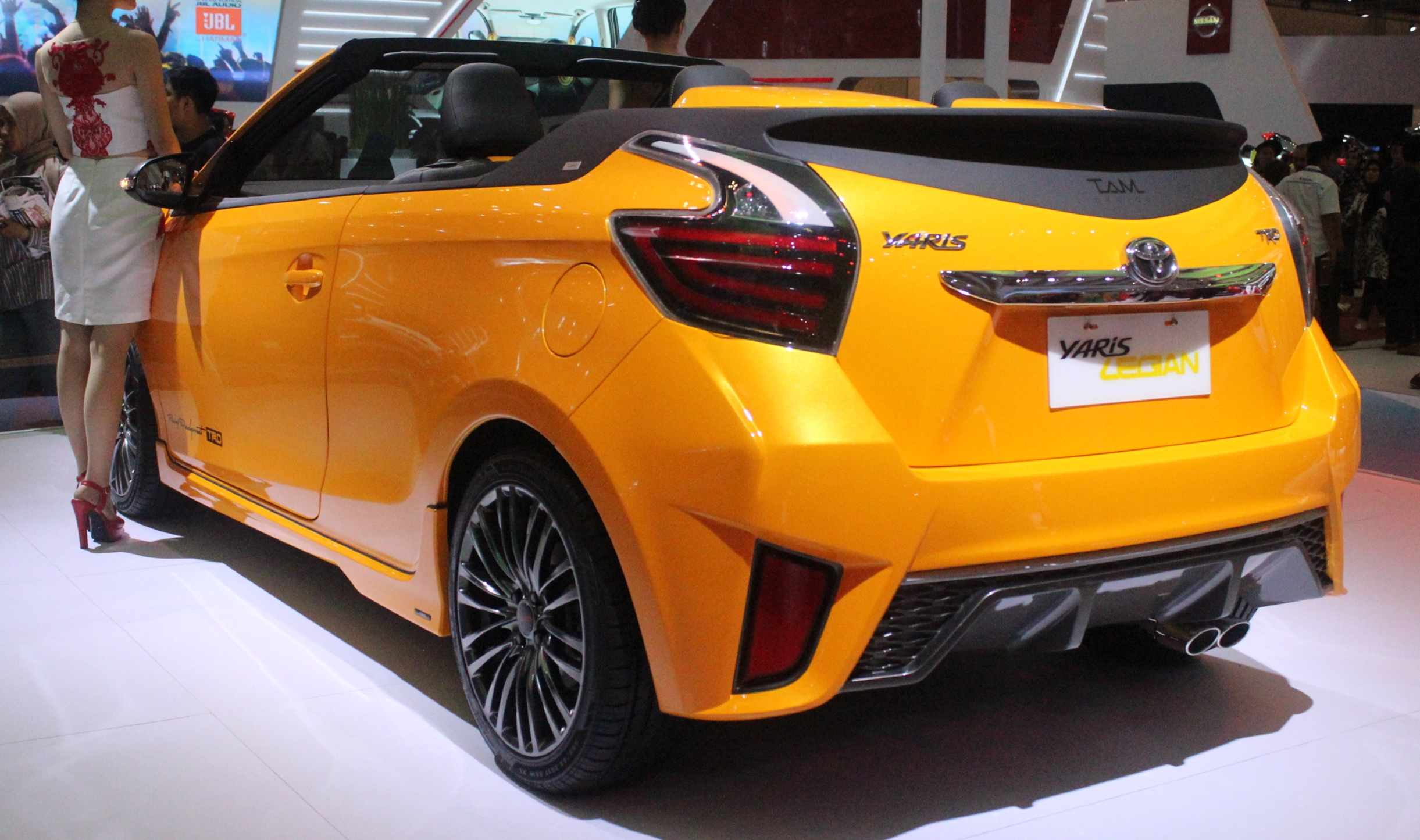
Yaris Legian (rear)

== Sales ==
Excluding models with Vios nameplate
Year	Thailand		Indonesia	Philippines	Malaysia	China		Brazil		Argentina	Mexico	Saudi Arabia
Year	Yaris	Ativ	Indonesia	Philippines	Malaysia	Hatchback	Sedan	Hatchback	Sedan	Argentina	Mexico	Saudi Arabia
2014	52,809		17,774	1,408	12	73,299						
2015	36,212		18,151	1,474	8	64,724						
2016	36,684		15,368	1,581	1	63,443						
2017	44,200		10,750	1,212	1	54,089	40,414			2,294		
2018	35,845	32,419	10,030	746	0	54,335	41,355	18,585	13,671	2,558	20,573	
2019	36,284		8,033	182	10,803	66,062	49,062	37,690	29,763	10,003	11,367	22,167
2020	26,240	20,337	4,556	31	14,511	88,300	25,436	21,799	16,131	6,594	8,021	17,432
2021	25,149	19,613	6,819	24	14,607	80,873	12,310	21,130	12,438	11,780	10,646	
2022	25,264	30,091	3,187		13,857			26,614	15,783	14,316	11,628	
2023	16,305	58,061	1,436		12,480	—	31	23,340	20,572	11,152	13,977	
2024	7,117	43,912	373		10,710	3	2	25,965	21,934	20,862	14,116	
2025						11	—	3,588	3,959	30,150		
