= Toyota Astra Motor =

Indonesian automobile manufacturer

PT Toyota-Astra Motor
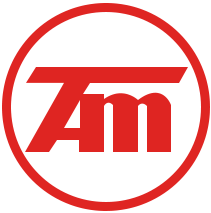

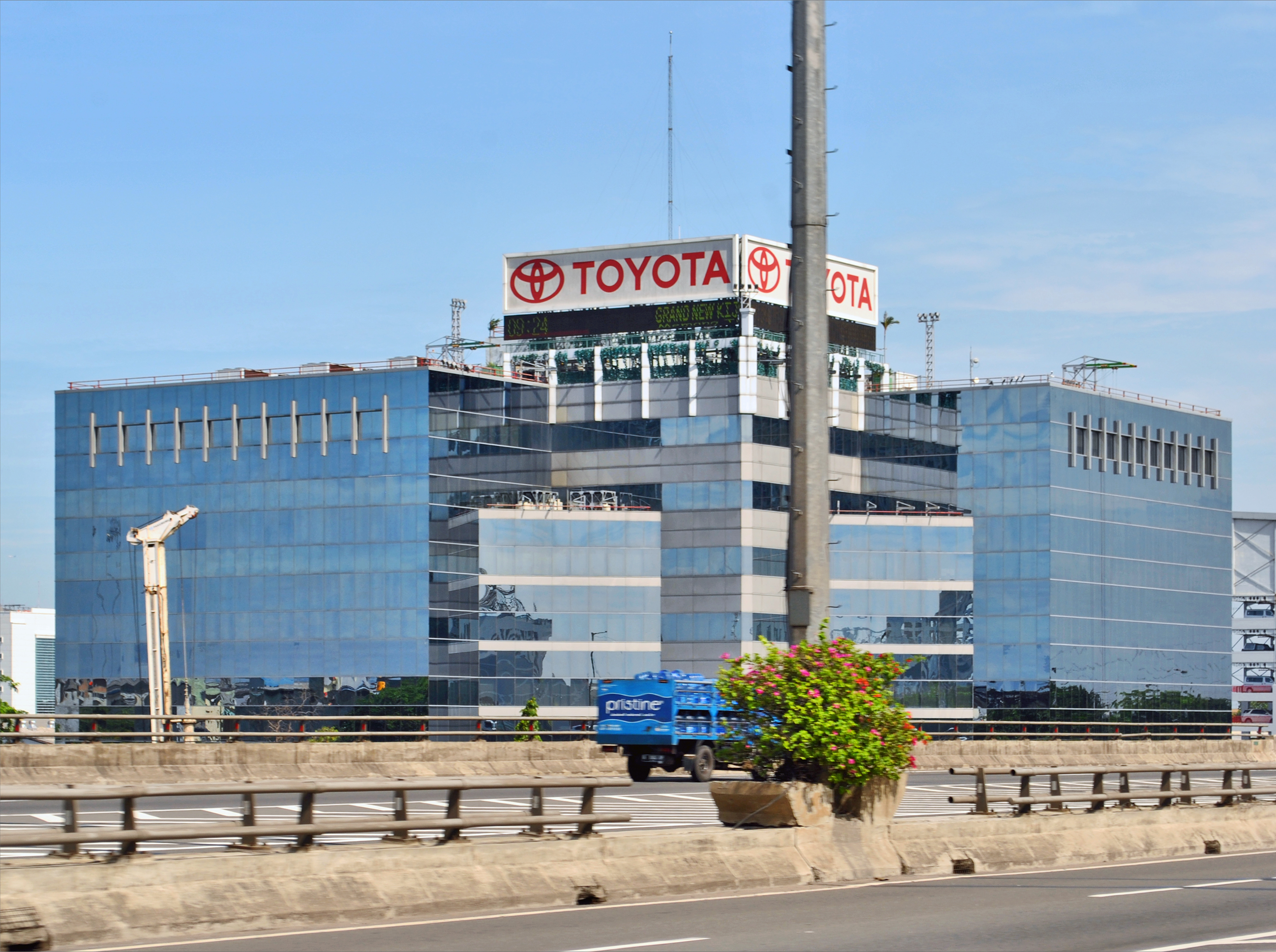
- Headquarters in Sunter, Jakarta
- Type: Joint venture
- Industry: Automotive
- Founded: 12 April 1971; 55 years ago
- Headquarters: Sunter, Jakarta
- Area served: Indonesia
- Key people: Djony Bunarto Tjondro (chairman); Takuya Yokohama (president); Jap Ernando Demily (vice president)
- Products: Automobiles
- Brands: Toyota; Lexus
- Owner: Toyota Motor Corporation (50%); Astra International (50%)
- Website: www.toyota.astra.co.id

PT Toyota-Astra Motor (also called TAM) is an automobile trading company based in Jakarta, Indonesia. It is a joint venture company between Toyota Motor Corporation and Astra International with a distribution of 50% shares each, acting as the sole agent, distributor, and importer of Toyota vehicles in Indonesia.

Toyota has been the best-selling car brand in Indonesia every year in a row since 1997. The country is also Toyota's fourth largest single market after the US, China and Japan.

PT Toyota Motor Manufacturing Indonesia
- Type: Subsidiary
- Industry: Automotive
- Founded: 1973; 53 years ago (as PT Multi Astra); 2003; 23 years ago (as TMMIN)
- Headquarters: Sunter, Jakarta
- Key people: Nandi Julyanto (president director - Board of Directors); Masahiko Maeda (President Director - Board of Commissioners
- Products: Automobiles
- Production output: ▲278,141 (2023)
- Owner: Toyota Motor Corporation (95%); Astra International (5%)
- Number of employees: 8,100
- Website: www.toyota.co.id

A separate company, PT Toyota Motor Manufacturing Indonesia (also called TMMIN) operated five Toyota manufacturing plants in the country and exported Toyota vehicles abroad. TMMIN is owned 95% by Toyota Motor Corporation and 5% by Astra International.

== History ==
TAM was established in 1971 as an importer for Toyota vehicles and transformed into a distributor company for the same brand a year later. The earliest models introduced by TAM were Corona and Corolla. Corona, a mid-size family sedan, which periodically changed models in 1974, 1978 and every other four years until in 1999 when it was discontinued to undergo a model change to Camry.

The Corolla was also introduced in Indonesia in the early 1970s, and entered its third generation by 1975. The sedan had captured the Indonesian market at the time. Toyota had created a new trend in sedan design: small, compact, and with rear-wheel drive. Both Corona and Corolla were highly accepted in the market during the early years. Later, other Toyota sedans entered the Indonesian market, such as the Starlet which was discontinued in 1998, the locally produced Soluna which was launched in 2000 and discontinued in 2003, and Cressida introduced in 1977 and discontinued in 1992, along with the Crown.

In the 4x4 class, Toyota introduced Land Cruiser which initially produced in 1951 and entered the Indonesian market in mid-1970s and was colloquially called "Toyota Hardtop". The vehicle was not only used for individual purposes, but also for industrial and military purposes. For commercial purposes, Toyota launched Toyota Dyna and Toyota HiAce; the latter was discontinued, only to return in September 2012 as a large van.

In 1977, the Kijang was launched in Jakarta. Developed as a basic utility vehicle specifically for Indonesia and the Philippines, the Kijang was later known for its easy and low-cost maintenance and later became a major success in the Indonesian automotive market. The first generation Kijang sold only 1,168 units during 1977, but a year later it increased to 4,629 units, four times as many as the year before. The number continued to rise during the next several years. The second generation was launched in 1981 with a production volume of 19,323 units in 1985. The third generation was later introduced in 1986 and sold 82,687 units in 1987, the largest sale ever in Kijang's history. Around 500,000 Kijang had been sold in Indonesia up to 1995, while the 1 millionth Kijang rolled out of the assembly line on 23 September 2003.

On 31 December 1998, TAM merged with three other companies: PT Multi Astra (a manufacturing company), PT Toyota Mobilindo (body parts manufacturing company), PT Toyota Engine Indonesia (specializing in engine manufacturing) under the name PT Toyota Astra Motor. Toyota stated the merger was carried out with the goal of improving efficiency, to meet increasing consumers’ demand for quality, and to effectively face competition in automotive industry. TAM initially consisted of two major departments, which are production and marketing departments.

In 2003, the production department was spun off from TAM, creating PT Toyota Motor Manufacturing Indonesia (TMMIN). TMMIN conducted functional activities included casting, engine, stamping and assembling automobiles. Some components were directly supplied from Japan by Toyota Motor Corporation and the remaining was supplied by local components suppliers. Its marketing division is divided into domestic and overseas (export) markets.

In 2003, TAM launched its first collaboration project with Daihatsu, the Avanza. The Avanza was developed as an entry-level small MPV cheaper and smaller than Kijang, manufactured entirely by partner company Astra Daihatsu Motor. A year later, the fifth-generation Kijang was introduced as the Kijang Innova. It was built above the IMV platform, which also spawned the Fortuner SUV and Hilux pick-up.

TAM started selling Lexus vehicles in mid 2007 along with the opening of the Lexus Gallery in Jakarta.

=== Slogans ===
- Terpilih Karena Tepercaya (1980s–1989)
- Leads You Ahead (1989–2001)
- Moving Forward (2006–2015)
- Let's Go Beyond (2015–present)

== Facilities ==
In 1998, TAM established a new manufacturing plant together with by parts and engine manufacturing plants in Karawang with the intention of establishing an integrated plant. The role of manufacturing has been passed to TMMIN since 2003 which operated two centers of production (Sunter and Karawang) and one parts center, the largest in Indonesia, which had been computerized since 1982 and was directly on line with Toyota's parts center in Haruhi, Japan. The Karawang plants (first operated in 1998 with total investment Rp 462.2 billion) were considered to be one of the most advanced in Indonesia at the time, built in 100 acres land with a test course and modern installation for environmental safety purposes.

=== Plants ===
Plant	Opened	Capacity/year (units)	Production line-up
Plant 1 Sunter (Engine Assy)	1973	195,000	Vehicle components, engine block
Plant 2 Sunter (Packing Center)	1977	10.25 million stroke	Stamping
Plant 1 Karawang	1998	130,000	IMV platform: Fortuner, Kijang Innova (AN140); TNGA-C platform: Kijang Innova Zenix (AG10); e-TNGA platform: bZ4X
Plant 2 Karawang	2013	120,000	Calya; EFC platform: Yaris; DNGA-B platform: Avanza, Veloz, Yaris Cross
Plant 3 Karawang	2016	218,000	1NR, 2NR, 1TR, 2TR engines

== Models ==
=== Current models ===
==== Manufactured locally ====
Model	Introduction	Indonesian production	Current model		Notes
Model	Introduction	Indonesian production	Indonesia introduction	Update/facelift	Notes
Avanza	2003	2021	2021 (W100)	–	Previously, the Toyota Avanza was produced independently by TMMIN between 2008 and 2011
bZ4X	2022	2025	2022 (EA10)	2025	Previously imported from Japan until 2025
Calya	2016	2019	2016 (B400)	2022	
Fortuner	2005	2007	2016 (AN150)	2020	Previously imported from Thailand until 2007
Kijang Innova (Note: Exported as Toyota Innova)	2004	2004	2015 (AN140) 2022 (AG10)	2020 –	
Yaris	2006	2014	2014 (XP150)	2020	Previously imported from Thailand between 2006 and 2014
Yaris Cross	2023	2023	2023 (AC200)	–	
Veloz	2021 (as nameplate)	2021	2021 (W100)	–	

==== Manufactured locally by Daihatsu ====
Model	Introduction	Indonesian production	Current model		Notes
Model	Introduction	Indonesian production	Indonesia introduction	Update/facelift	Notes
Agya (Note: Exported as Toyota Wigo for some markets)	2012	2013	2023 (A350)	–	
Avanza	2003	2003	2021 (W100)	–	
Calya	2016	2016	2016 (B400)	2022	
Raize	2021	2021	2021 (A250)	–	
Rush	2006	2006	2017 (F800)	2024	

==== Manufactured locally by Hino ====
- Toyota Dyna (2009–present)

==== Imported ====
Toyota

- Toyota Alphard (2008–present, imported from Japan)
- Toyota Camry (2002–present, imported from Thailand) (Note: Previously assembled locally between 1999 and 2002)
- Toyota Corolla Altis (2001–present, imported from Thailand) (Note: Previously assembled locally between 1971 and 2001)
- Toyota Corolla Cross (2020–present, imported from Thailand)
- Toyota GR86 (2012–present, imported from Japan) (Note: Previously known as Toyota 86)
- Toyota GR Corolla (2024–present, imported from Japan)
- Toyota GR Yaris (2021–present, imported from Japan)
- Toyota HiAce (2012–present, imported from Japan) (Note: Previously assembled locally between 1971 and 1985)
- Toyota Hilux (2007–present, imported from Thailand)
- Toyota Hilux Rangga (2024–present, imported from Thailand)
- Toyota Land Cruiser (imported from Japan)
- Toyota Land Cruiser FJ (2026–present, imported from Thailand)
- Toyota Urban Cruiser (2025–present, imported from India)
- Toyota Vellfire (2015–present, imported from Japan)
- Toyota Vios (2022–present, imported from Thailand) (Note: Previously assembled locally between 2013 and 2022)
- Toyota Voxy (2017–present, imported from Japan)

Lexus

- Lexus ES (2013–present, imported from Japan)
- Lexus LBX (2024–present, imported from Japan)
- Lexus LM (2020–present, imported from Japan)
- Lexus LX (2011–present, imported from Japan)
- Lexus NX (2015–present, imported from Japan)
- Lexus RX (2009–present, imported from Japan)
- Lexus RZ (2023–present, imported from Japan)
- Lexus UX (2019–present, imported from Japan)

=== Former models ===
==== Manufactured locally ====
- Toyota Corona (1971–1998)
- Toyota Corona Mark II (1980–1985)
- Toyota Cressida (1985–1989)
- Toyota Crown (1976–1984, 1989–2000)
- Toyota Etios Valco (2013–2017)
- Toyota Kijang (1977–2007)
- Toyota NAV1 (2012–2017)
- Toyota Sienta (2016–2023)
- Toyota Soluna (2000–2003)
- Toyota Starlet (1985–1998)

==== Imported ====
- Lexus LC (2017–2026, imported from Japan)
- Lexus LS (2007–2026, imported from Japan)
- Toyota C-HR (2018–2023, imported from Thailand)
- Toyota Crown (1971–1974, 2000–2019, imported from Japan)
- Toyota C+pod (2021, imported from Japan) (Note: This model only serves a rental system (Bali and Lake Toba).)
- Toyota COMS (2021, imported from Japan) (Note: This model only serves a rental system (Bali).)
- Toyota GR Supra (2019–2026, imported from Austria)
- Toyota Land Cruiser Prado (1998–2001, imported from Japan)
- Toyota Mark X (2012–2013, imported from Japan)
- Toyota Previa (2000–2011, imported from Japan)
- Toyota Prius (imported from Japan)
- Toyota RAV4 (imported from Japan)
