= Toyota Yaris Cross =

Subcompact crossover SUV

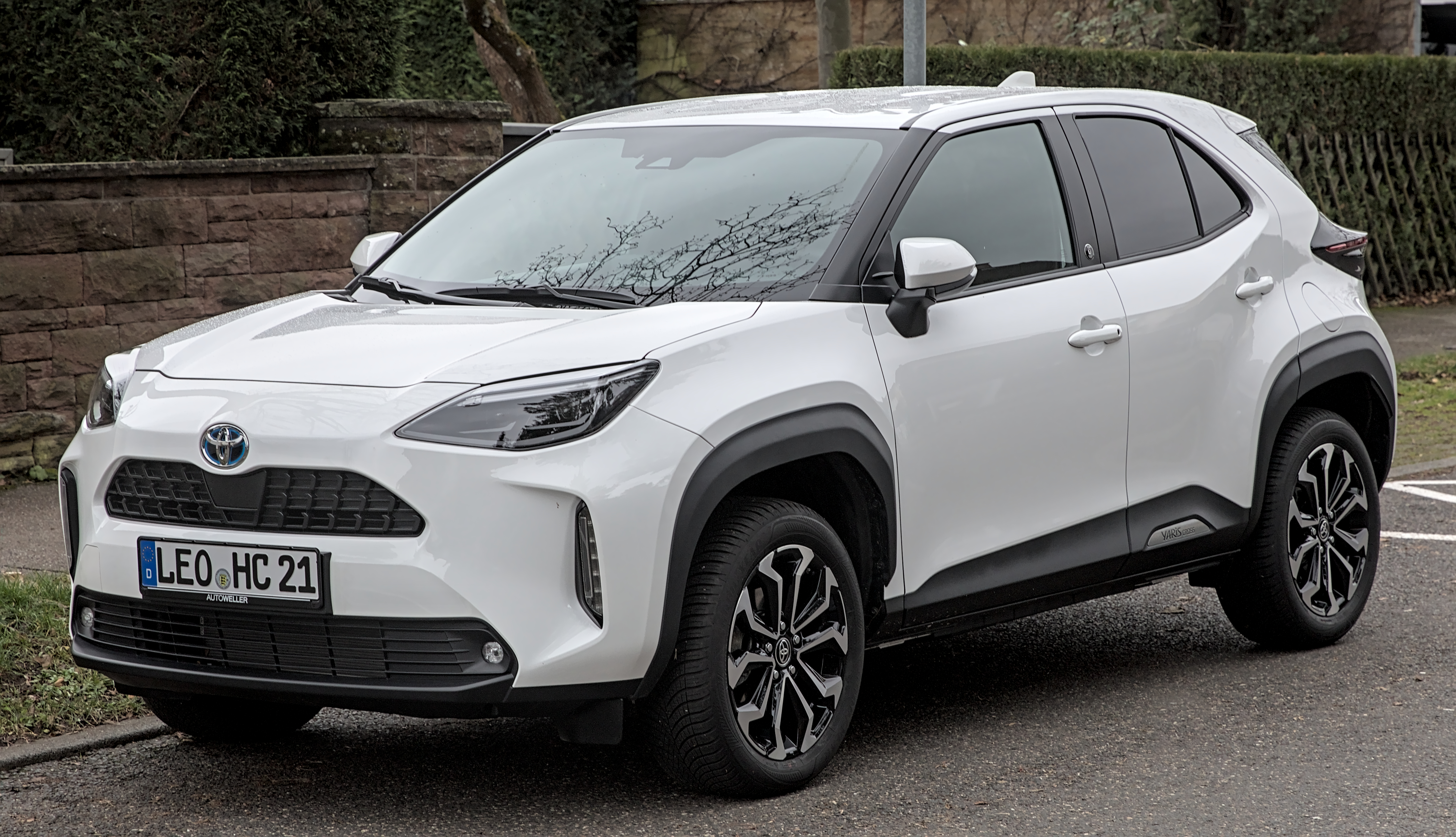
- Toyota Yaris Cross (XP210)

Overview
- Manufacturer: Toyota
- Production: 2020–present (XP210); 2023–present (AC200)

Body and chassis
- Class: Subcompact SUV (B)
- Body style: 5-door crossover SUV

The Toyota Yaris Cross (Japanese: トヨタ・ヤリスクロス, Hepburn: Toyota Yarisu Kurosu) is a nameplate used by the Japanese automaker Toyota for two vehicles in the subcompact SUV category (B-segment). The nameplate first appeared for the crossover SUV counterpart of the XP210 model Yaris based on the Toyota New Global Architecture, which went on sale in August 2020 in Japan and in 2021 in Europe with the model code XP210.

In May 2023, Toyota released another vehicle with the same name in Indonesia, which is larger and based on the Daihatsu New Global Architecture, with the model code AC200. This version is available in most of Southeast Asia, Taiwan, and other emerging markets in Latin America and the Caribbean.

== XP210 series (2020) ==
XP210
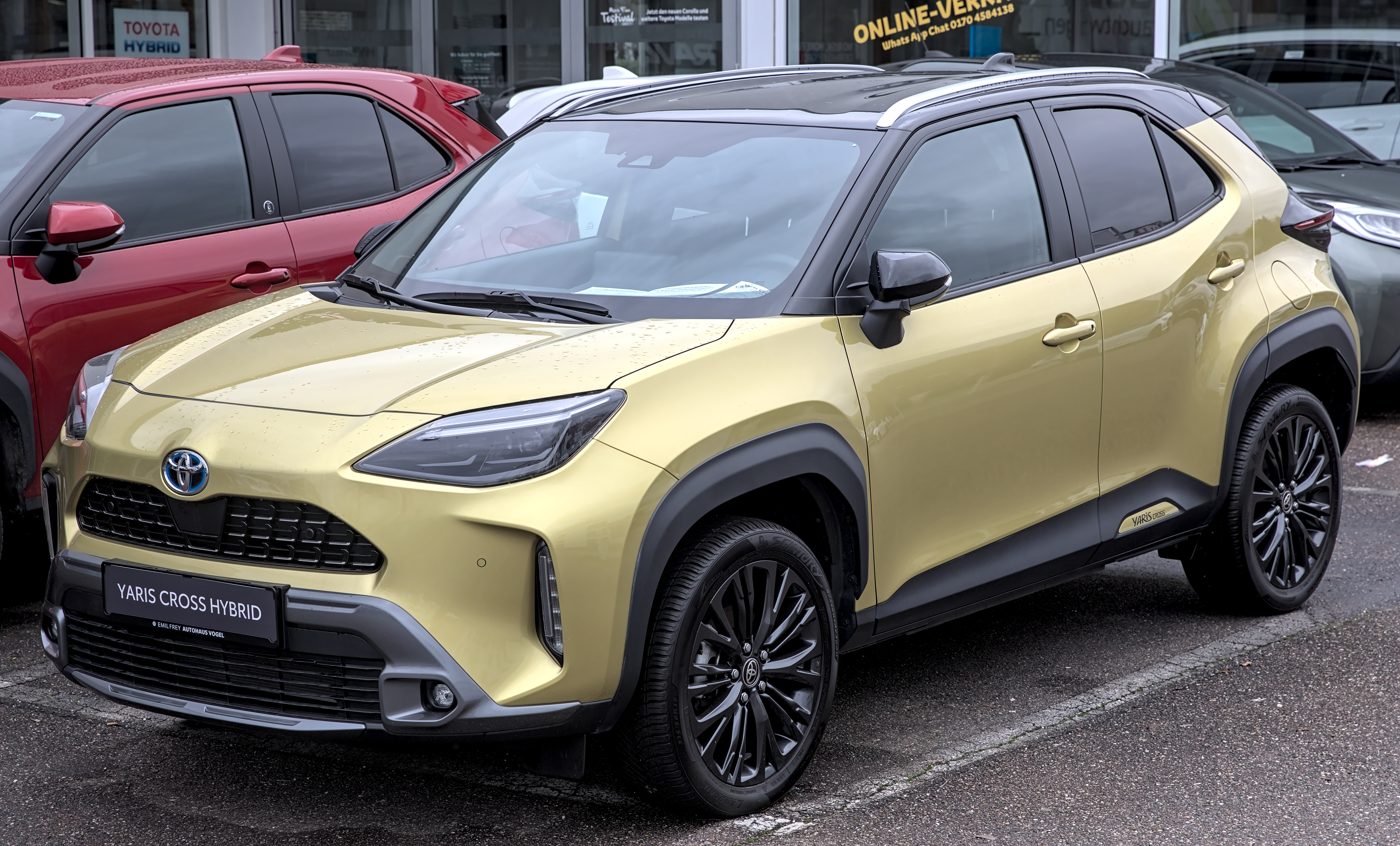
- 2023 Yaris Cross Hybrid (Europe)

Overview
- Model code: XP210
- Production: August 2020 – present
- Assembly: Japan: Kanegasaki, Iwate (TMEJ); France: Onnaing (TMMF)
- Designer: Hideaki Iida, Jun Takahashi, Maki Kobayashi and Yoshikazu Shoji

Body and chassis
- Layout: Front-engine, front-wheel-drive; Front-engine, all-wheel-drive (E-four/AWD-i)
- Platform: TNGA: GA-B
- Related: Toyota Yaris (XP210); Toyota Aqua (XP210); Toyota Sienta (XP210); Lexus LBX

Powertrain
- Engine: Petrol: 1490 cc M15A-FKS I3 (2020-2024); Petrol hybrid: 1490 cc M15A-FXE I3
- Electric motor: 1NM AC synchronous (front, hybrid models); 1MM AC synchronous (rear, hybrid models)
- Transmission: 6-speed manual (2020-2024); CVT (2020-2024); eCVT
- Hybrid drivetrain: Power-split
- Battery: 177.6 V lithium-ion (hybrid models)

Dimensions
- Wheelbase: 2,560 mm (100.8 in)
- Length: 4,180–4,200 mm (164.6–165.4 in)
- Width: 1,765 mm (69.5 in)
- Height: 1,560–1,590 mm (61.4–62.6 in)
- Kerb weight: 1,110–1,270 kg (2,447–2,800 lb)

Chronology
- Predecessor: Toyota Ist/Urban Cruiser (XP110)

Primarily marketed for the Japanese, European, Oceanian, and Singaporean markets, the XP210 series Yaris Cross is built on GA-B platform as the XP210 series Yaris hatchback and positioned between the Aygo X or Raize and C-HR in Toyota's crossover SUV lineup. It replaces the Japanese/European market XP110 series Ist/Urban Cruiser.

The Yaris Cross was originally planned to be unveiled at the 2020 Geneva Motor Show; however, the show was cancelled due to the COVID-19 pandemic. Toyota then released the first pictures and specifications of the Yaris Cross on 23 April 2020. The model went on sale in Japan in September 2020, Australia in November 2020 and in Europe in mid-2021.

Development was done alongside the Yaris hatchback, led by Yasunori Suezawa as chief engineer and Hideaki Hayashi as deputy chief engineer under the internal "Toyota Compact Car Company". The design of the Yaris Cross is a collaboration between Toyota's European and Japanese studios, combining cues from the Yaris with features from Toyota's larger SUVs such as the more angular RAV4. According to Toyota, the Yaris Cross resembles a diamond when viewed from above because of its wider midsection, which allowed the designers to broaden the wheel arches to achieve a more 'rugged' styling. The dashboard design shares many components with the Yaris hatchback. The wheelbase of the Yaris Cross is identical to the European market Yaris, but the ground clearance is increased by 30 mm (1.2 in) over the standard Yaris.

Toyota offers an all-wheel-drive variant (Intelligent All-Wheel Drive, AWD-i) for the hybrid version, unlike other B-segment SUVs which are predominantly front-wheel drive especially in Europe. The system does not require a driveshaft, and instead utilising an electrified rear axle that supplies power during acceleration or when more traction is required. Under the WLTP test cycle, the i-AWD version of the new Yaris Cross emits 135 g/km of CO_{2}, and 120 g/km for the front-wheel drive variant.

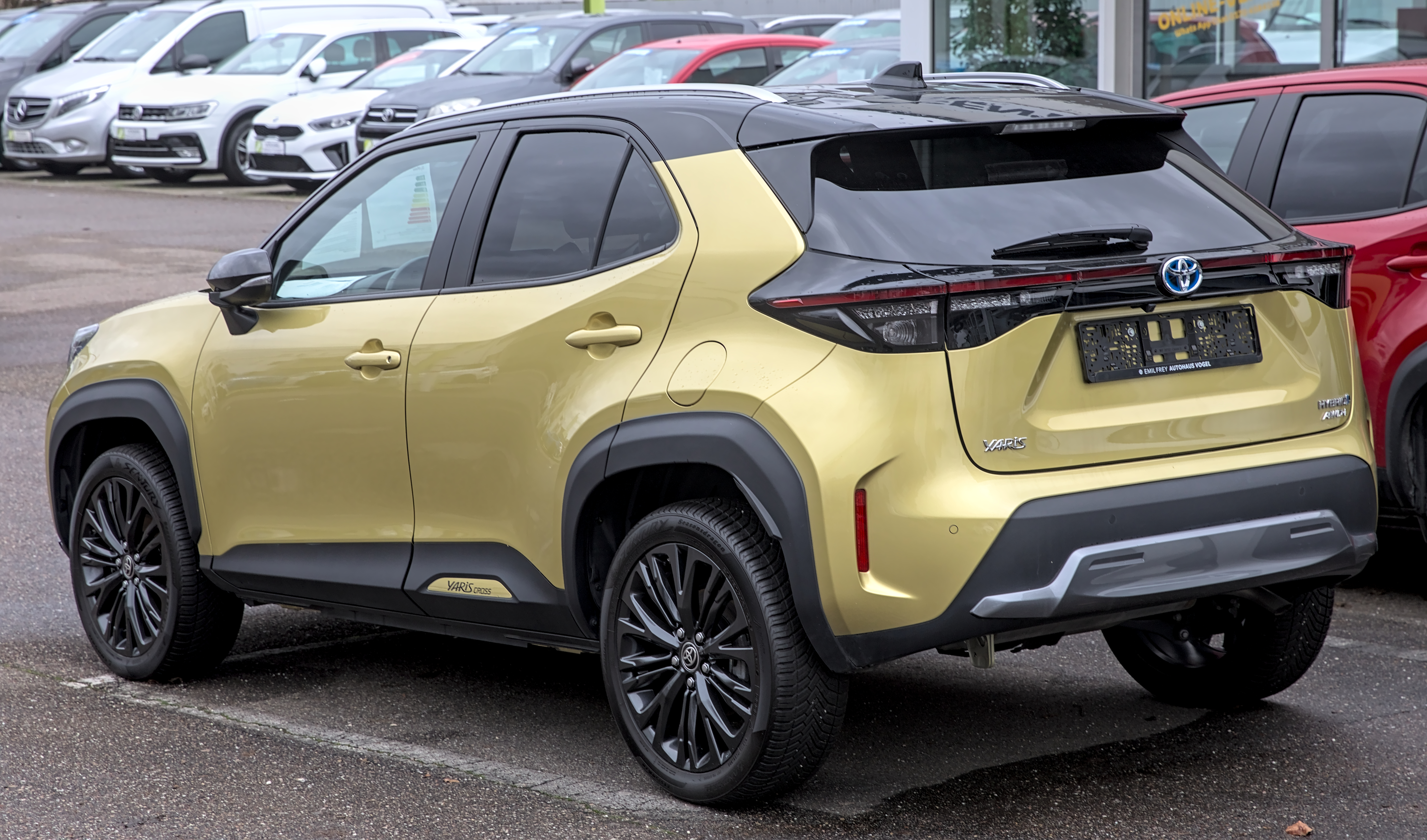
Rear view

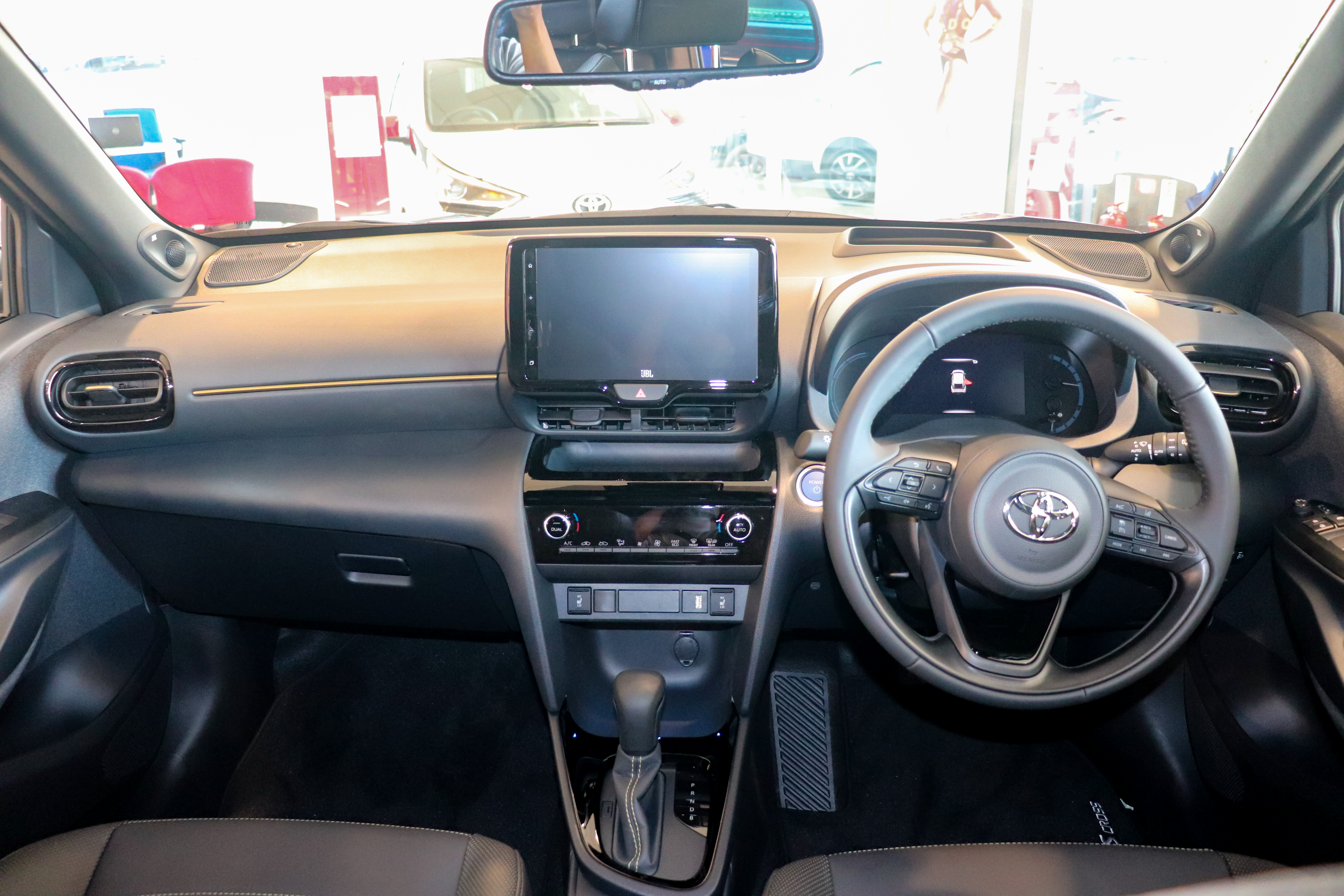
Interior

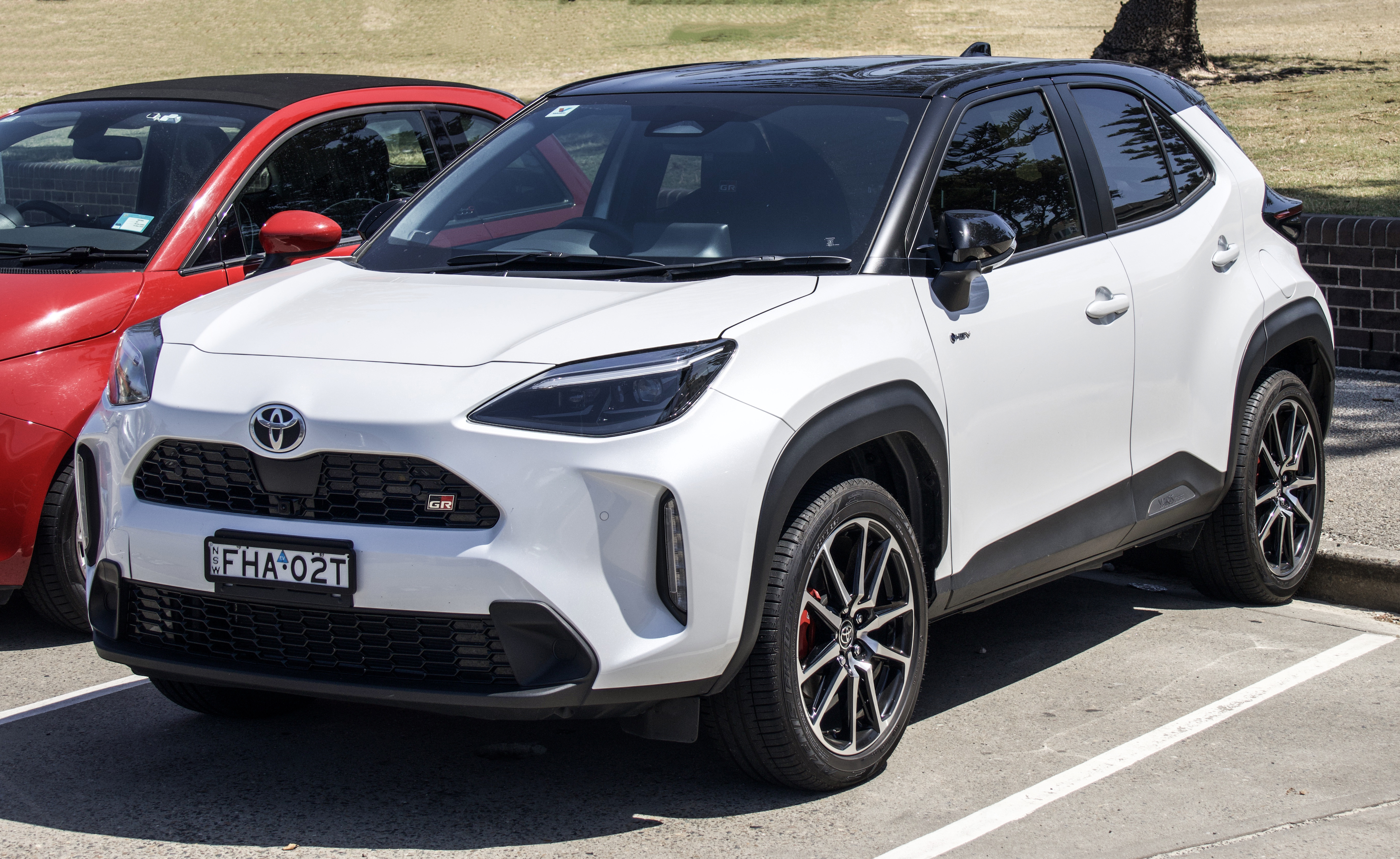
Yaris Cross GR Sport (front)

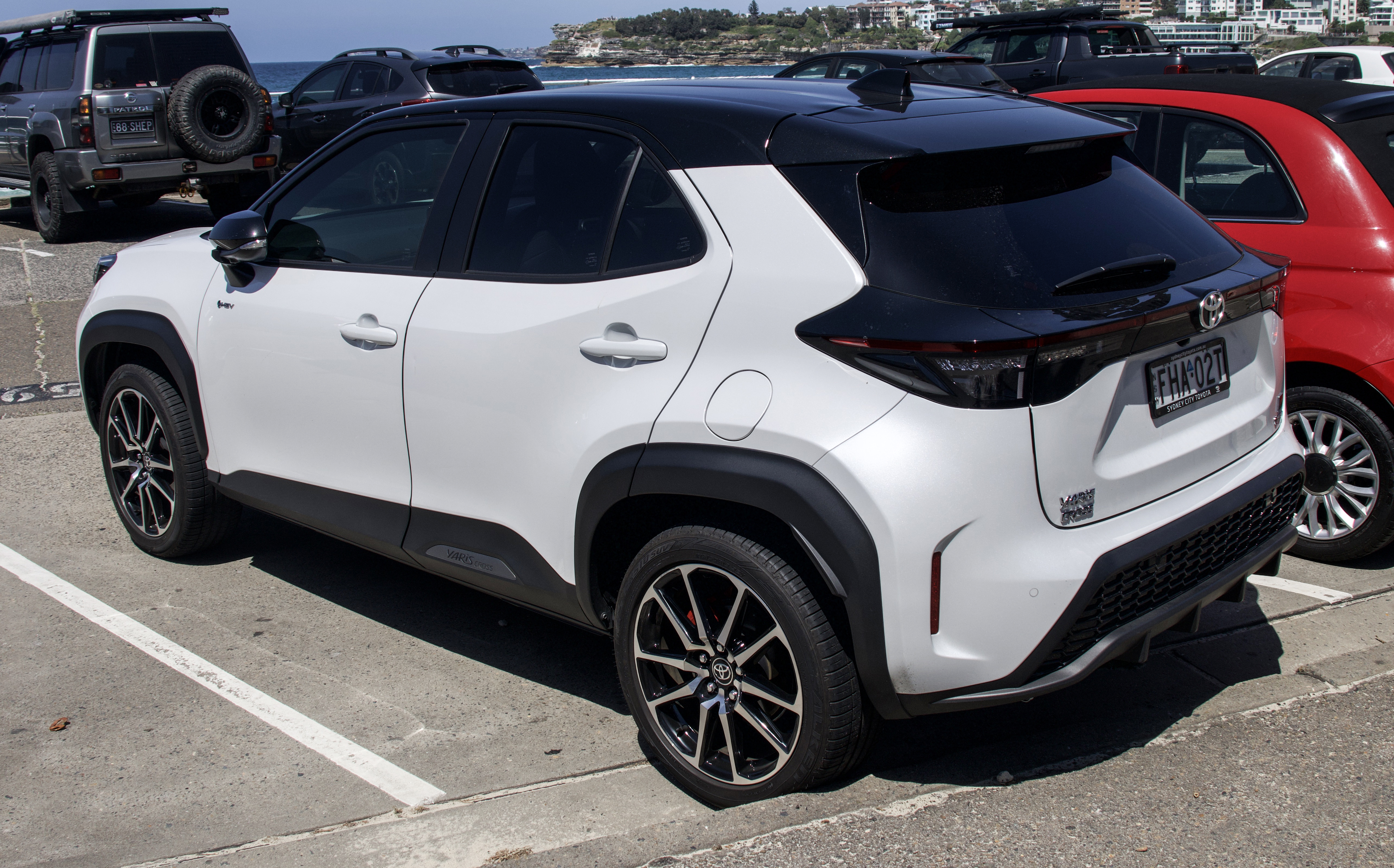
Yaris Cross GR Sport (rear)

=== Production ===
The Yaris Cross is manufactured in Japan at Toyota Motor East Japan and France at Toyota Motor Manufacturing France, the same as the standard Yaris. The company planned to produce 150,000 units of the Yaris Cross per year in its French factory. The first Yaris Cross unit rolled out from the French factory in July 2021.

=== 2023 update ===
The Yaris Cross was updated on 21 November 2023 in Europe. Updates consists of a new "Premiere Edition" trim, which includes a new Urban Khaki two-tone paint, redesigned 18-inch alloy wheels, and green accents on the upholstery, instrument panel and doors. Other changes include a choice of new electric motor which improves the power output to 130 hp (97 kW; 132 PS) and 185 N⋅m (18.9 kg⋅m; 136 lb⋅ft) of torque, new Toyota Smart Connect multimedia system with a choice of 12.3-inch instrument panel and 10.5-inch head unit, improved NVH levels, thicker glass on the windscreen and side windows, revised Toyota Safety Sense features, new upholstery patterns, a soft lower instrument panel covering, and a new Juniper Blue paint option.

=== 2026 facelift ===
The facelift was unveiled on 16 April 2026 in Europe. Changes include redesigned front fascia, LED headlights, honeycomb grille, redesigned 18- and 17-inch alloy wheels, new Precious Bronze paint option and SakuraTouch leather material for upholstery for the Trail grade, which is made with PVC with recycled materials.

2026 facelift

Rear view

=== Markets ===
==== Asia ====
===== Japan =====
In Japan, the Yaris Cross was sold from August 2020 and is available in both petrol and hybrid variants. All-wheel drive is available as an option and Toyota Safety Sense is standard across the line-up. It was initially available in X, G and Z trim levels. On 19 July 2022, two new trim levels were added: GR Sport and Z Adventure.

In 2024, a new grade level was added: U. The U grade is only available for lease through the company's Kinto service, along with the Yaris hatchback.

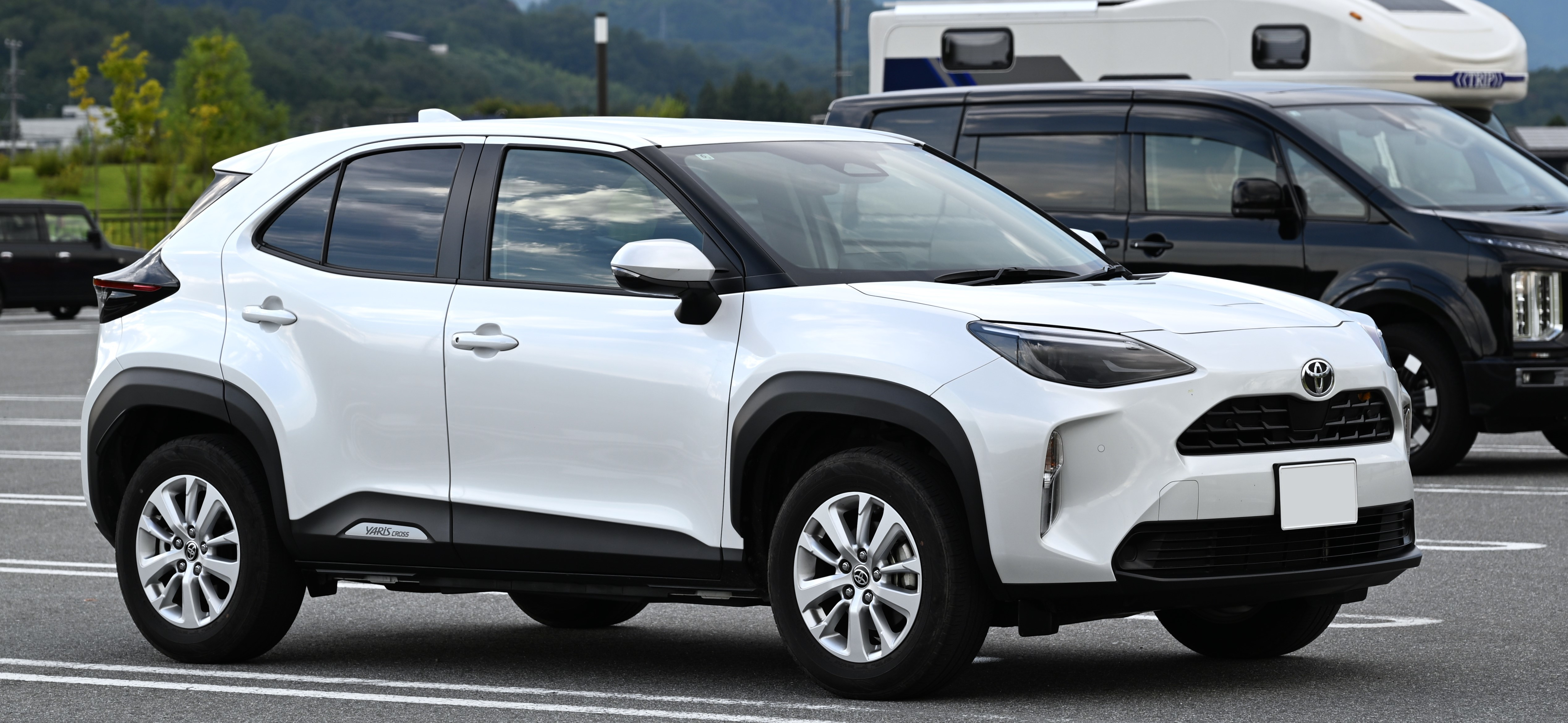
Toyota Yaris Cross Hybrid G; 2024 revision

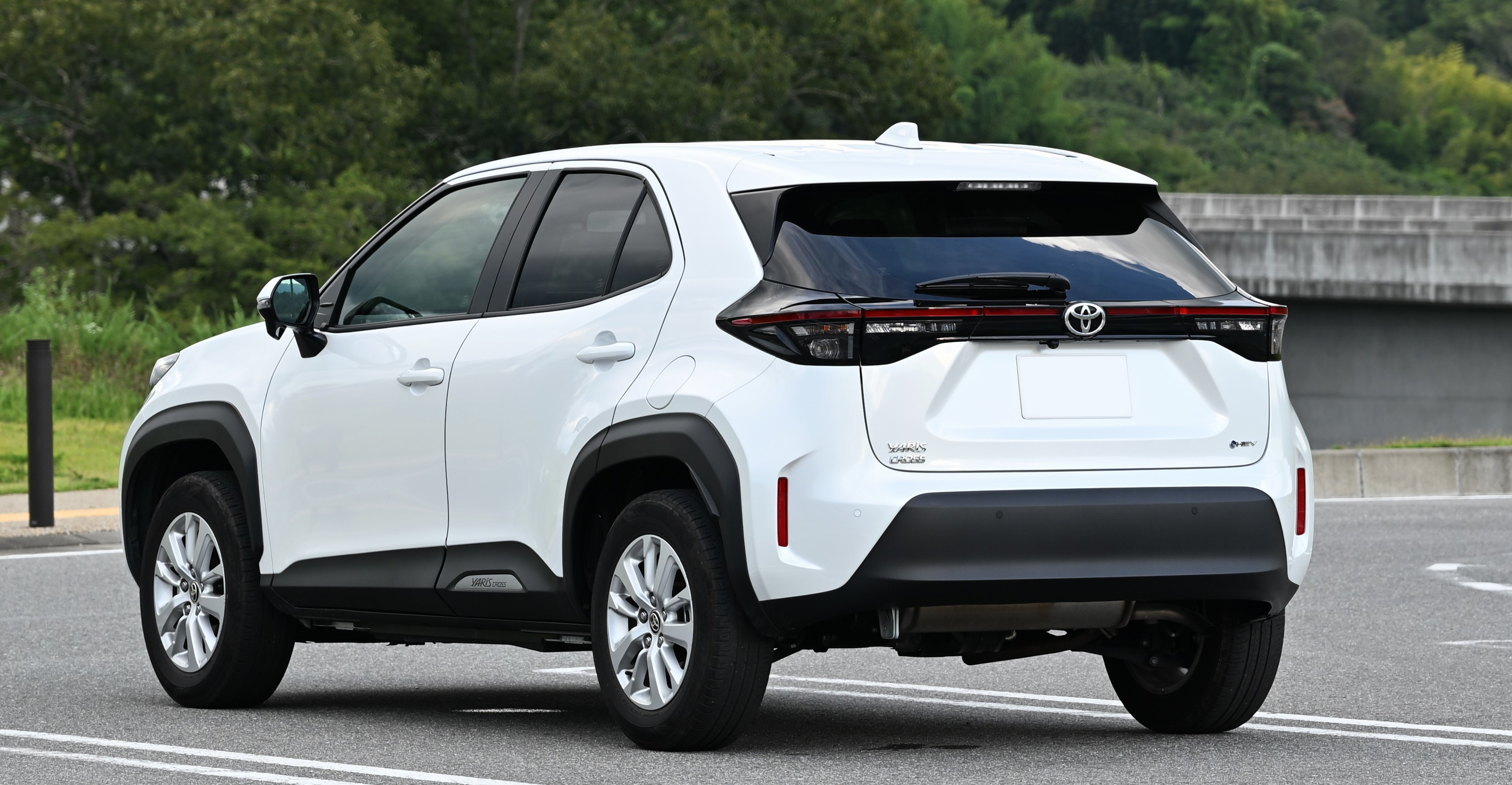
Toyota Yaris Cross Hybrid G; 2024 revision

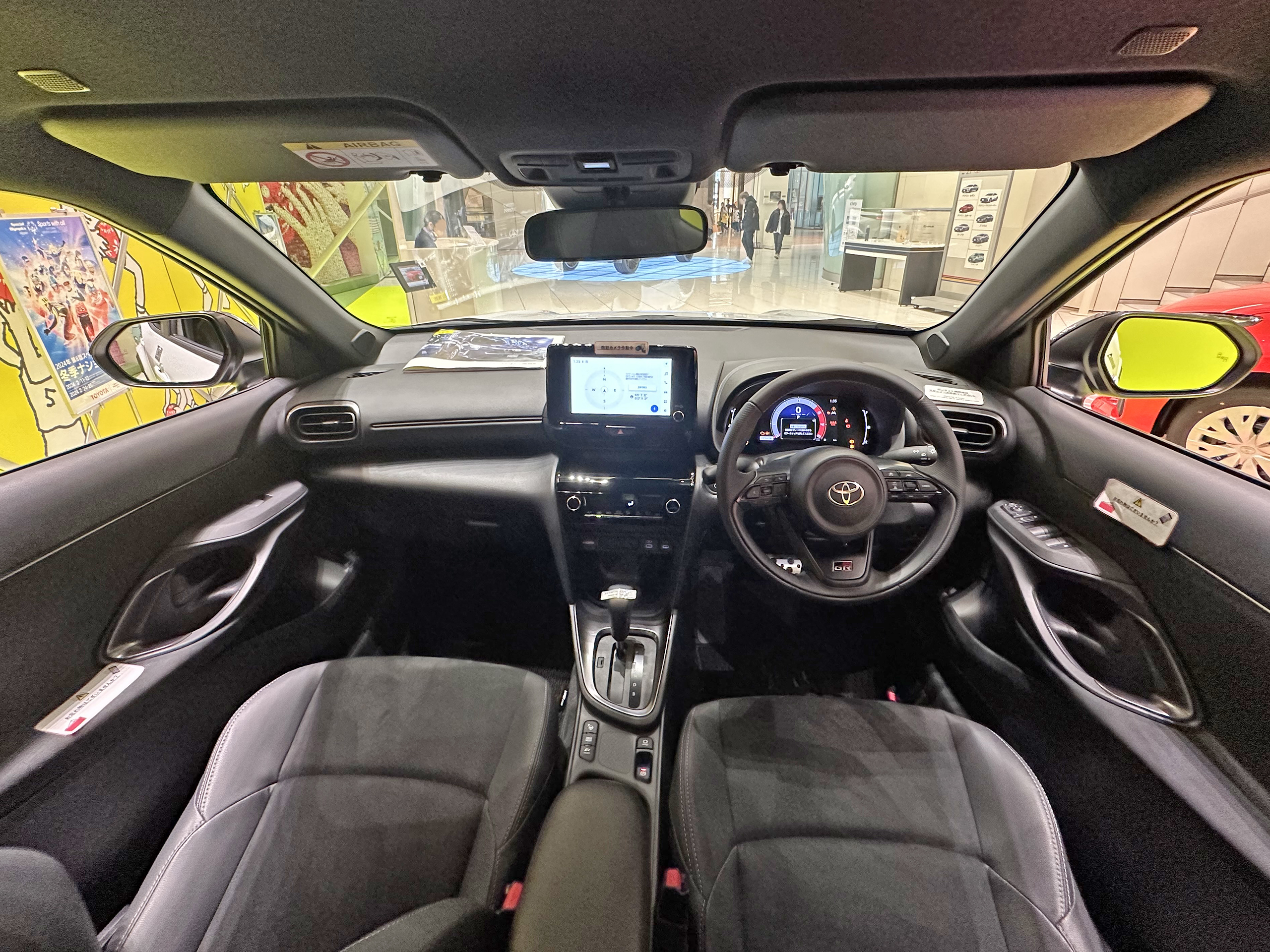
Yaris Cross interior (2024 improvement)

===== Singapore =====
The Yaris Cross was launched by Borneo Motors in Singapore on 14 January 2021, with two trim levels: Active and Excite, it is powered by a M15A-FXE hybrid powertrain.

==== Oceania ====
===== Australia =====
The Yaris Cross was launched in Australia in November 2020, with three trim levels available: GX, GXL, and Urban. It is available with petrol and hybrid powertrains for each trim, and the AWD-e all-wheel drive option is available across the line-up. In December 2022, the GR Sport trim for the Yaris Cross was introduced, powered only by a hybrid powertrain.

===== New Zealand =====
The Yaris Cross was launched in New Zealand in November 2020, with three variants available: GX, Hybrid GX and Hybrid Limited. In January 2023, a GR Sport trim was added to the line-up, powered only by a hybrid powertrain.

==== South America ====
===== Colombia =====
The Yaris Cross XP210 made its South American debut in Colombia in December 2021, with two trim levels: XS and XLS. The M15A-FXE hybrid powertrain is available for the latter trim.

===== Ecuador =====
The Yaris Cross was launched in Ecuador on 13 May 2022, in a sole variant, powered only by M15A-FXE hybrid powertrain. Toyota Safety Sense is available as an option.

=== Powertrain ===
Type	Engine code	Displ.	Power	Torque	Combined system output	Electric motor	Battery	Transmission	Model code	Layout	Cal. years
Petrol	M15A-FKS	1,490 cc (1.5 L) I3	88 kW (118 hp; 120 PS) @ 6,600 rpm	145 N⋅m (14.8 kg⋅m; 107 lb⋅ft) @ 4,800–5,200 rpm	-	-	-	6-speed manual, CVT	MXPB10	FWD	2020–2024
Petrol	M15A-FKS	1,490 cc (1.5 L) I3	88 kW (118 hp; 120 PS) @ 6,600 rpm	145 N⋅m (14.8 kg⋅m; 107 lb⋅ft) @ 4,800–5,200 rpm	-	-	-	6-speed manual, CVT	MXPB15	AWD	2020–2024
Petrol hybrid	M15A-FXE	1,490 cc (1.5 L) I3	Engine: 67 kW (90 hp; 91 PS) @ 5,500 rpm Front motor: 59 kW (79 hp; 80 PS)	Engine: 120 N⋅m (12.2 kg⋅m; 88.5 lb⋅ft) @ 3,600–4,800 rpm Front motor: 141 N⋅m (14.4 kg⋅m; 104 lb⋅ft)	85 kW (114 hp; 116 PS)	1NM AC synchronous (front)	177.6 V lithium-ion	eCVT	MXPJ10	FWD	2020–present
Petrol hybrid	M15A-FXE	1,490 cc (1.5 L) I3	+ Rear motor: 3.9 kW (5.2 hp; 5.3 PS)	+ Rear motor: 52 N⋅m (5.3 kg⋅m; 38 lb⋅ft)	85 kW (114 hp; 116 PS)	+ 1MM AC synchronous (rear)	177.6 V lithium-ion	eCVT	MXPJ15	AWD-i	2020–present

=== Safety ===
The Yaris Cross was tested for automotive safety by ANCAP and Euro NCAP in September 2021 and October 2021 respectively (their protocols are aligned). It received five stars out of a possible five from both tests.

ANCAP test results Toyota Yaris Cross all variants excluding GR Sport (2021, aligned with Euro NCAP)
Test	Points	%
Overall:	5 /5 stars	
Adult occupant:	32.98	86%
Child occupant:	42.29	86%
Pedestrian:	42.57	78%
Safety assist:	13.22	82%

Euro NCAP test results Toyota Yaris Cross (2021)
Test	Points	%
Overall:	5 /5 stars	
Adult occupant:	33.0	86%
Child occupant:	41.2	84%
Pedestrian:	42.6	78%
Safety assist:	13.0	81%

Euro NCAP test results Toyota Yaris Cross (2025)
Test	Points	%
Overall:	4 /5 stars	
Adult occupant:	31.8	79%
Child occupant:	41.7	85%
Pedestrian:	52.9	83%
Safety assist:	13.8	76%

=== Awards ===
The Yaris Cross was awarded as the 2022 "World Urban Car of The Year".

== AC200 series (2023) ==
AC200
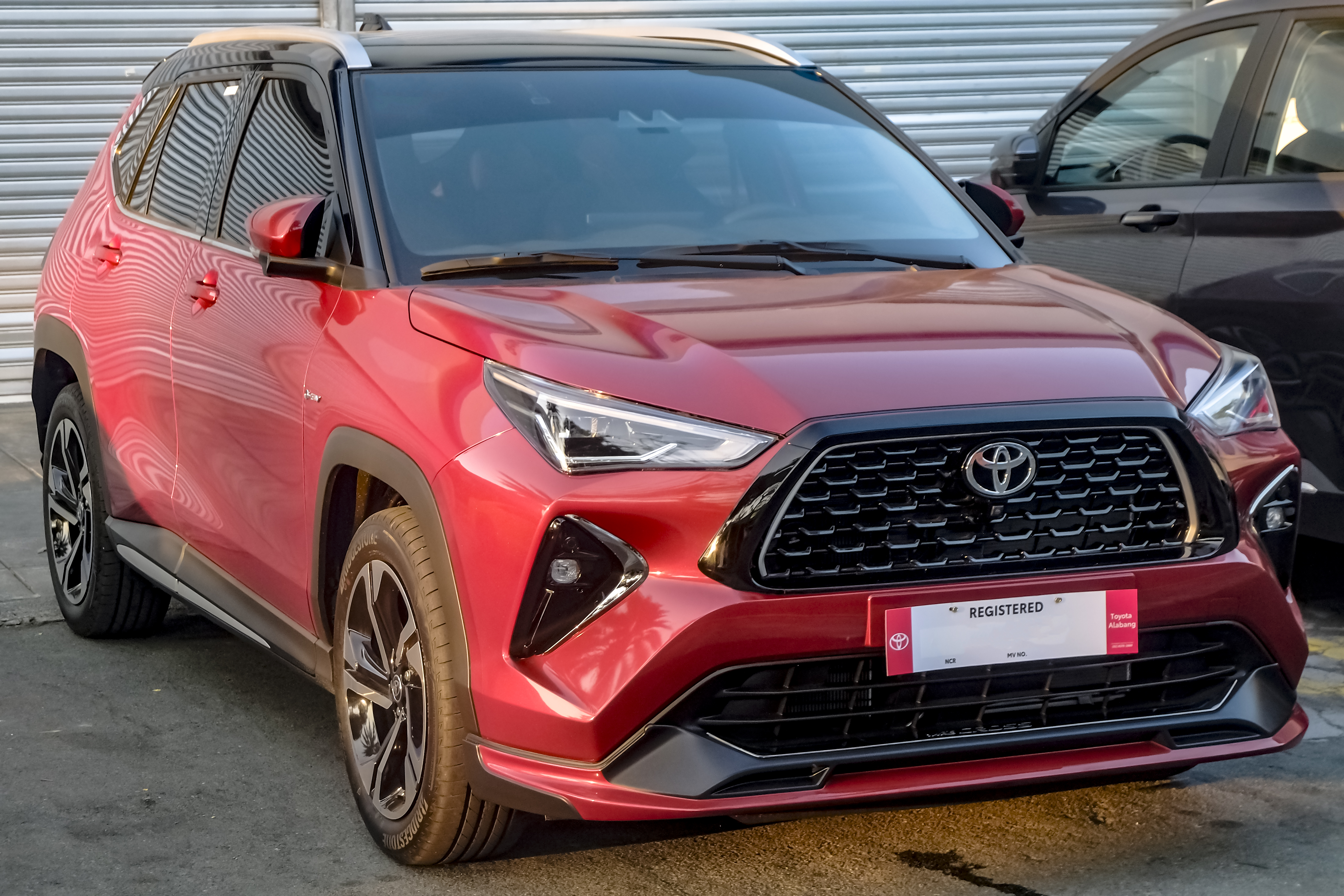
- 2025 Yaris Cross SE HEV (NYC200, Philippines)

Overview
- Model code: AC200
- Also called: Perodua Traz (Malaysia)
- Production: June 2023 – present
- Assembly: Indonesia: Karawang (TMMIN); Taiwan: Guanyin (Kuozui Motors); Thailand: Chachoengsao (TMT); Brazil: Sorocaba (Toyota do Brasil); Malaysia: Rawang, Selangor (PMSB, for Perodua Traz); Bukit Raja (UMW)
- Designer: Atsushi Ikeuchi and Shun Ohoka

Body and chassis
- Layout: Front-engine, front-wheel-drive
- Platform: Daihatsu New Global Architecture: DNGA-B
- Related: Toyota Avanza/Veloz (W100); Toyota Vios / Yaris / Yaris Ativ (AC100)

Powertrain
- Engine: Petrol: 1.5 L 2NR-VE I4; Petrol hybrid: 1.5 L 2NR-VEX I4
- Electric motor: 1NM AC synchronous (hybrid)
- Transmission: 5-speed manual; CVT; eCVT (hybrid)
- Hybrid drivetrain: Power-split
- Battery: 0.7 kWh lithium-ion (hybrid)

Dimensions
- Wheelbase: 2,620 mm (103.1 in)
- Length: 4,310 mm (169.7 in)
- Width: 1,770 mm (69.7 in)
- Height: 1,615 mm (63.6 in); 1,655 mm (65.2 in) (Malaysia)
- Kerb weight: 1,175–1,285 kg (2,590–2,833 lb)

The AC200 series Yaris Cross was first unveiled in Indonesia on 15 May 2023, and started production on 13 June 2023 at Toyota Motor Manufacturing Indonesia facility in Karawang, West Java, for both local and export markets amounting to 25 countries. Indonesian sales commenced on the same date.

The development of the model was done by Daihatsu through a joint Toyota-Daihatsu internal company known as Emerging-market Compact Car Company (ECC), under the lead of chief engineer Toru Uda. It shares the DNGA-B platform with the AC100 series Vios/Yaris sedan. The front section of the platform such as the engine compartment is shared with the Avanza/Veloz, while the under section and wheelbase was reworked. The ground clearance is rated at 210 mm (8.3 in).

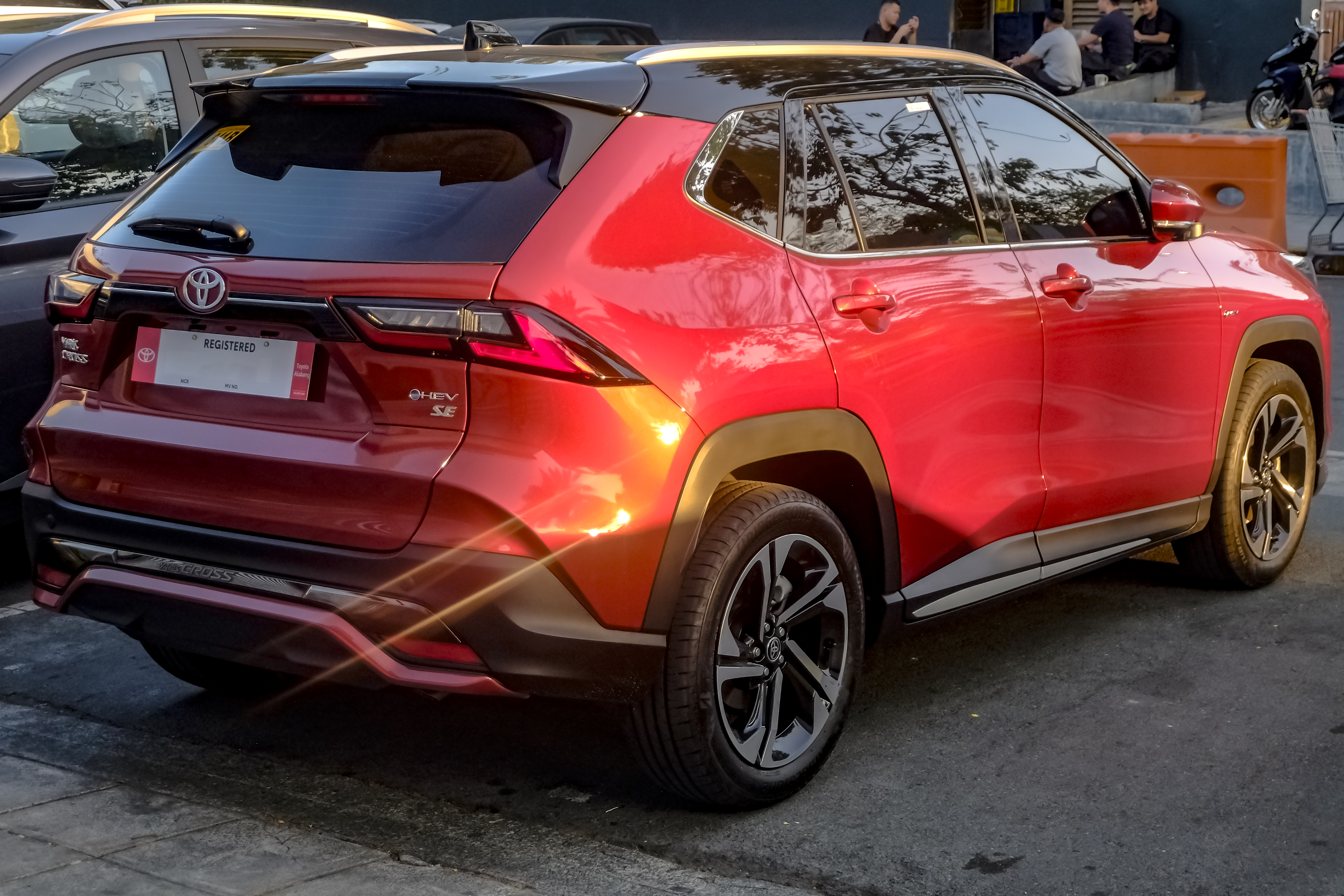
Rear view

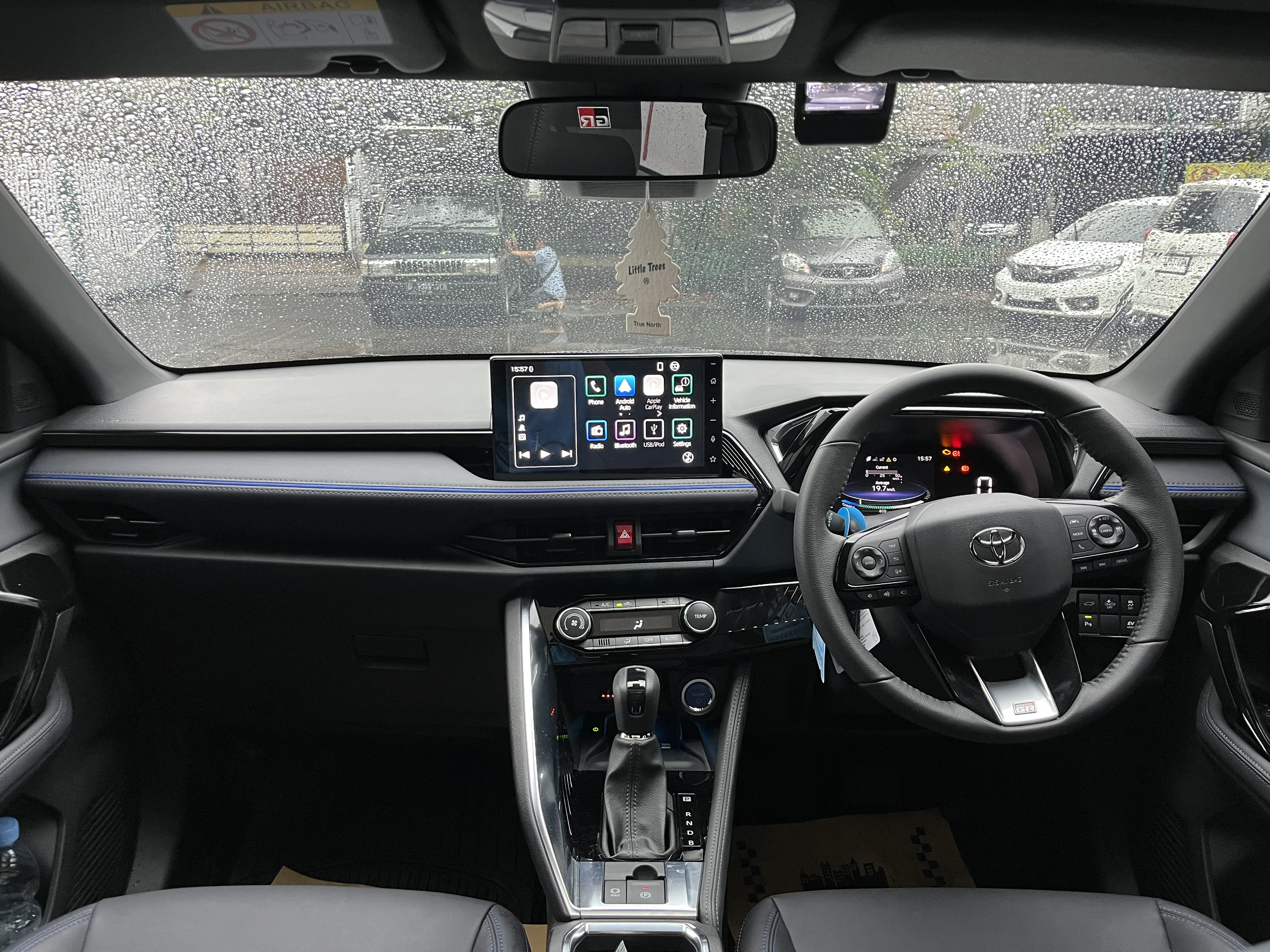
Interior

=== Markets ===
==== Americas ====
===== Argentina =====
The AC200 series Yaris Cross was launched in Argentina on 23 February 2026, with five variants: XLI 1.5 CVT, XEI 1.5 CVT, SEG 1.5 CVT, XEI HEV 1.5 e-CVT and SEG HEV 1.5 e-CVT.

===== Bolivia =====
The AC200 series Yaris Cross was launched in Bolivia on 22 September 2023, with four variants: Mid M/T, Mid CVT, High CVT, and HEV e-CVT.

===== Brazil =====
The AC200 series Yaris Cross was launched at the São Paulo Auto Show on 19 November 2025. Locally produced in Sorocaba, São Paulo, it is available in five trim levels: XR, XRE, XRE Hybrid, XRX and XRX Hybrid. Toyota Safety Sense is standard.

===== Chile =====
The AC200 series Yaris Cross was launched in Chile on 11 October 2023, with three variants: XI M/T, XI CVT, and XG CVT.

===== Costa Rica =====
The AC200 series Yaris Cross was launched in Costa Rica on 17 August 2023. It is available in New Line, High Line and Hybrid trim levels, the former two trims are powered with the 1.5-litre 2NR-VE engine, while the latter is powered by the 1.5-litre 2NR-VEX hybrid powertrain.

===== Guatemala =====
The AC200 series Yaris Cross was launched in Guatemala on 18 October 2023. Three trim levels are available, the highest trim is powered by the 1.5-litre 2NR-VEX hybrid powertrain. Toyota Safety Sense is standard.

===== Honduras =====
The AC200 series Yaris Cross was launched in Honduras on 17 November 2023, in the sole variant powered by a 1.5-litre 2NR-VEX hybrid powertrain.

===== Jamaica =====
The AC200 series Yaris Cross was launched in Jamaica on 5 October 2023, with the 1.5-litre 2NR-VE engine.

===== Panama =====
The AC200 series Yaris Cross was launched in Panama on 13 October 2023. It is available in two trim levels: Base and Full, both are only powered by the 1.5-litre 2NR-VE petrol engine mated to a CVT.

===== Paraguay =====
The AC200 series Yaris Cross was launched in Paraguay on 3 November 2023, with two powertrains: 1.5-litre 2NR-VE engine, and the 1.5-litre 2NR-VEX hybrid powertrain.

===== Peru =====
The AC200 series Yaris Cross made its South American debut in Peru on 21 September 2023, with four variants: Full M/T, Full CVT, HEV Full e-CVT, and Full D-Lux CVT.

===== Trinidad and Tobago =====
The AC200 series Yaris Cross was launched in Trinidad and Tobago on 7 October 2023. It is available in the sole trim, powered solely by the 1.5-litre 2NR-VEX hybrid powertrain. Toyota Safety Sense is standard.

===== Venezuela =====
The AC200 series Yaris Cross was launched in Venezuela on 23 November 2023, in the sole variant powered by a 1.5-litre 2NR-VE engine.

==== Asia ====
===== Brunei =====
The AC200 series Yaris Cross was launched in Brunei on 17 January 2024. It is offered in two trim levels: G with a 1.5-litre 2NR-VE engine and S with a 1.5-litre 2NR-VEX hybrid powertrain. Toyota Safety Sense is standard for the S Hybrid variant.

===== Cambodia =====
The AC200 series Yaris Cross was launched together with the Wigo in Cambodia on 7 July 2023. Initially, it was offered in a single trim level, paired only with the 1.5-litre 2NR-VE engine. A new trim with the hybrid powertrain was added on 17 November 2023. Toyota Safety Sense is standard.

===== Indonesia =====
The Indonesian market Yaris Cross is initially available in three trim levels: G, S and S HEV, the former can be equipped with either a 5-speed manual or a CVT while the latter two can be only equipped with a CVT. It is the second Toyota hybrid model produced in Indonesia, following the Kijang Innova Zenix HEV. A total of 116 suppliers contribute up to 80 percent of the local content value, including batteries and engines. Toyota Safety Sense is standard on the S and S Hybrid trim levels, while a GR Parts package consisting of body kits and other cosmetic parts are optional on either S and S Hybrid trim levels.

A new G HEV trim level was added at the 33rd Indonesia International Motor Show on 5 February 2026.

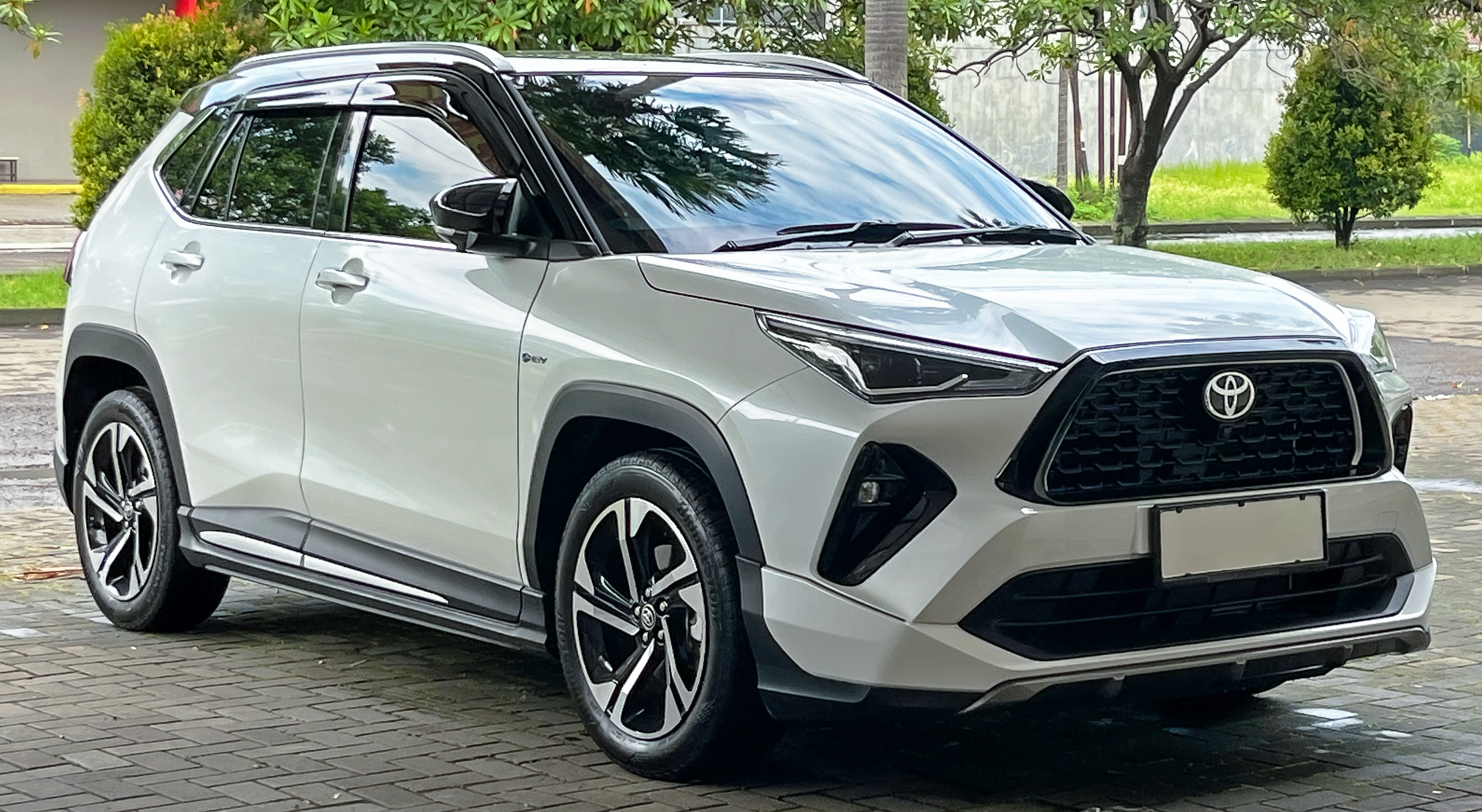
2023 Yaris Cross S HEV with GR Parts (NYC200, Indonesia)

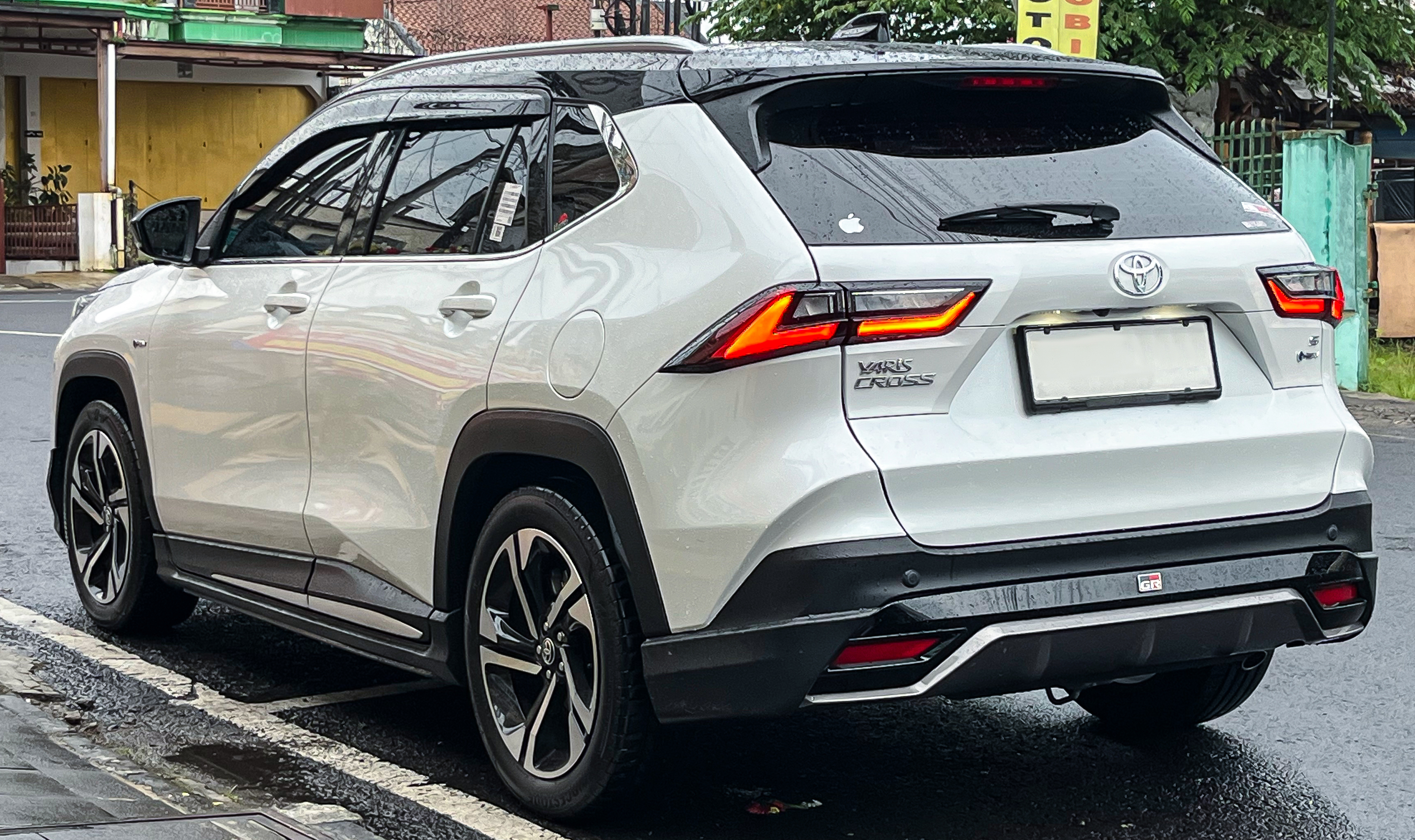
Rear view with GR Parts

===== Laos =====
The AC200 series Yaris Cross was launched in Laos on 22 September 2023. It is only offered with the 1.5-litre 2NR-VEX hybrid powertrain trim level. Toyota Safety Sense is standard.

===== Malaysia =====
The AC200 series Yaris Cross was launched in Malaysia on 8 May 2026. Locally assembled (CKD) at the Bukit Raja plant, it is available with two variants: 1.5S and 1.5S HEV.

===== Philippines =====
The AC200 series Yaris Cross was launched in the Philippines on 4 August 2023 and is available in three trim levels: G, V and S HEV, the former two trim levels are powered with the 1.5-litre 2NR-VE engine, while the latter is powered by the 1.5-litre 2NR-VEX hybrid powertrain. The petrol models are equipped with Daihatsu's Dual Mode CVT or D-CVT, while the Hybrid trim is paired with Toyota's eCVT transmission. Toyota Safety Sense is standard for the V and S Hybrid trim levels. In August 2025, the SE HEV variant was added to the line-up, slotted above the S HEV grade.

===== Taiwan =====
The Taiwanese market Yaris Cross was unveiled in August 2023 and it was officially launched on 28 September 2023. Three trim levels: Hedonic Edition, Cool Edition and Trendy Edition, all powered by the 1.5-litre petrol engine paired to a CVT transmission. Toyota Safety Sense is standard. It is locally assembled by Kuozui Motors.

===== Thailand =====
The AC200 series Yaris Cross was launched in Thailand on 5 October 2023. Produced at the Gateway plant in Chachoengsao, it is offered in three trim levels: Smart, Premium and Premium Luxury, it is only offered with a 1.5-litre 2NR-VEX hybrid powertrain. Toyota Safety Sense is standard for the Premium and Luxury trims. In November 2025, the HEV Nightshade Edition variant was added to the line-up.

===== Vietnam =====
The Vietnamese market Yaris Cross was released on 19 September 2023. It is offered in two trim levels, the highest trim is offered with the 1.5-litre 2NR-VEX hybrid powertrain. Toyota Safety Sense is standard.

=== Perodua Traz ===
The model is produced and marketed in Malaysia by Perodua as the Perodua Traz and was released on 17 December 2025. It is available in two trims: X and H, powered by a 1.5-litre 2NR-VE petrol engine paired with a D-CVT transmission. The Advanced Safety Assist (ASA) systems package is standard on both trim levels, with the omission of cruise control. The name Traz derived from the Malay word teras which means 'core'.

The Perodua model has a differentiated front fascia design, front and rear bumpers and wheel designs for the exterior, the interior dashboard features body coloured trim pieces and red stitching, a 9-inch touchscreen infotainment system, and equipped with the Idle Stop feature. Unlike the Toyota, the Traz is not available with the 1.5-litre 2NR-VEX petrol hybrid.

=== Powertrain ===
For the petrol model, the AC200 series Yaris Cross is powered by the 1.5-litre 2NR-VE engine rated at 78 kW (106 PS; 105 hp) and 138 N⋅m (14.1 kg⋅m; 102 lb⋅ft). The hybrid model is powered by the 1.5-litre 2NR-VEX engine, which is a world-first application. It is an Atkinson cycle engine based on the 2NR-VE rated at 67 kW (91 PS; 90 hp), combined with a single electric motor producing 59 kW (80 PS; 79 hp) with a total output of 82 kW (111 PS; 110 hp). It is supplemented with a 0.7 kWh lithium-ion battery, which is mounted under the rear seats.

Type	Engine code	Displ.	Power	Torque	Combined system output	Electric motor	Battery	Transmission	Model code	Layout	Cal. years
Petrol	2NR-VE	1,496 cc (1.5 L) I4	78 kW (105 hp; 106 PS) @ 6,000 rpm	138 N⋅m (14.1 kg⋅m; 102 lb⋅ft) @ 4,200 rpm	-	-	-	5-speed manual Dual Mode CVT (D-CVT)	NGC200	FWD	2023–present
Petrol hybrid	2NR-VEX	1,496 cc (1.5 L) I4	Engine: 67 kW (90 hp; 91 PS) @ 5,500 rpm Motor: 59 kW (79 hp; 80 PS)	Engine: 121 N⋅m (12.3 kg⋅m; 89.2 lb⋅ft) @ 4,000–4,800 rpm Motor: 141 N⋅m (14.4 kg⋅m; 104 lb⋅ft)	82 kW (110 hp; 111 PS)	1NM AC synchronous	0.7 kWh lithium-ion	eCVT	NYC200	FWD	2023–present

=== Safety ===
==== ASEAN NCAP ====
In July 2025, the vehicle was tested for automotive safety by ASEAN NCAP. It received five stars out of a possible five.

ASEAN NCAP test results Toyota Yaris Cross (2025)
Test	Points
Overall:	5 /5 stars
Adult occupant:	36.60
Child occupant:	17.32
Safety assist:	16.89
Motorcyclist Safety:	12.21

ASEAN NCAP test results Perodua Traz (2025)
Test	Points
Overall:	5 /5 stars
Adult occupant:	38.57
Child occupant:	17.21
Safety assist:	18.57
Motorcyclist Safety:	12.50

==== Latin NCAP ====
In 2025, the vehicle in its most basic Latin American configuration with 6 airbags was tested for automotive safety by Latin NCAP 3.0 (similar to Euro NCAP 2014). It received 2 stars out of a possible 5.

Latin NCAP 3.5 test results Toyota Yaris Cross + 6 Airbags (2025, similar to Euro NCAP 2017)
Test	Points	%
Overall:	2 /5 stars	
Adult occupant:	30.80	77%
Child occupant:	33.95	69%
Pedestrian:	26.69	56%
Safety assist:	25.00	58%

==== TNCAP ====
TNCAP (2025, 1.0 test result Toyota Yaris Cross 'Delight' (similar to Euro NCAP 2017)
Test	Points	%
Overall:	4 /5 stars	
Adult occupant:	30.515	80%
Child occupant:	34.905	71%
Pedestrian:	34.792	82%
Safety assist:	8.024	66%

=== Motorsport ===
In 2024, a Yaris Cross Hybrid was modified by Toyota Gazoo Racing Thailand (TGRT) to participate in RAAT Thailand Rally Championship 2024. According to TGRT, the car retained the hybrid system but it was modified to meet RC 2.1 class specifications. In the first round of the race, the car finished 1st in its category, and 18th place overall out of 52 entries.

=== Awards ===
The AC200 Yaris Cross Hybrid won the 2024 Car of the Year by Otomotif Award.

=== Recall ===
In February 2024, Toyota issued a recall for the AC200 Yaris Cross marketed in Indonesia and the Philippines. The vehicle received an incorrect tightening of the front shock absorber nuts, which may cause damage to the vehicle posing risk to stability. A total of 5,130 units in Indonesia and 3,378 units in the Philippines, all of which produced between May and September 2023 were affected.

Another recall was issued for the AC200 Yaris Cross Hybrid marketed in Indonesia and the Philippines in May 2025. The vehicle received an incorrect application of glass primer, which could have a reduced adhesive bond between the roof glass and panel. In worst cases, the panoramic glass roof could detach from the vehicle’s structure and increase the risk of accident to other road users. A total of 8,288 units in Indonesia and 5,086 units in the Philippines, all of which produced between May 2023 and November 2024 were affected.

== Sales ==
=== XP210 model ===
Year	Japan	Europe (Note: Toyota Motor Europe: Europe including Russia and Turkey + Armenia, Georgia, Azerbaijan, Kazakhstan and Israel)	Australia
2020	32,570		
2021	98,160	22,743	7,828
2022	82,710	156,086	8,432
2023	101,060	195,569	6,514
2024	79,600	204,797	8,206
2025	86,910	200,477	

=== AC200 model ===
Year	Indonesia	Philippines	Thailand	Taiwan	Vietnam
2023	7,550	5,353	8,522	4,500	3,065
2024	4,823	8,199	35,500	17,052	11,174
2025	3,637	5,950	36,085	15,000	14,601
