= Sunter, Jakarta =

Area of North Jakarta, Indonesia

Coordinates: 6.136937°S 106.862089°E

Sunter is a neighborhood in North Jakarta, Indonesia. The neighborhood corresponds roughly with the Sunter Agung and Sunter Jaya administrative village (Indonesian: kelurahan, desa) of Tanjung Priok subdistrict of North Jakarta. Zip code of the area is 14350. The area is adjacent to Plumpang Semper in the north, Kemayoran in the west, Kelapa Gading in the east and Cempaka Mas in the south. The area probably named after Sunter River, which flows through the neighborhood. The area is a low terrain and prone to flooding during heavy rain.

== Facilities ==
Sunter is now a place for a lot of luxury housing complexes and offices, warehouses and showroom for cars. There is a baseball, softball, cricket batting facility called Amerindo Batting Cages. There is a Radio Controlled has/electric car race track called Warung RC. There is Radio Controlled gas powered boat racing in Sunter Lake. There are peddle boat rentals at Sunter Lake. There are sports and outdoor exercise areas at Gelora Sunter. Several car wash facilities are around Astra Motors distribution center.

=== Residential ===
Sunter Agung is a planned residential area by a private developer. The area has both cluster of housing estate as well as many high rise apartment complex.

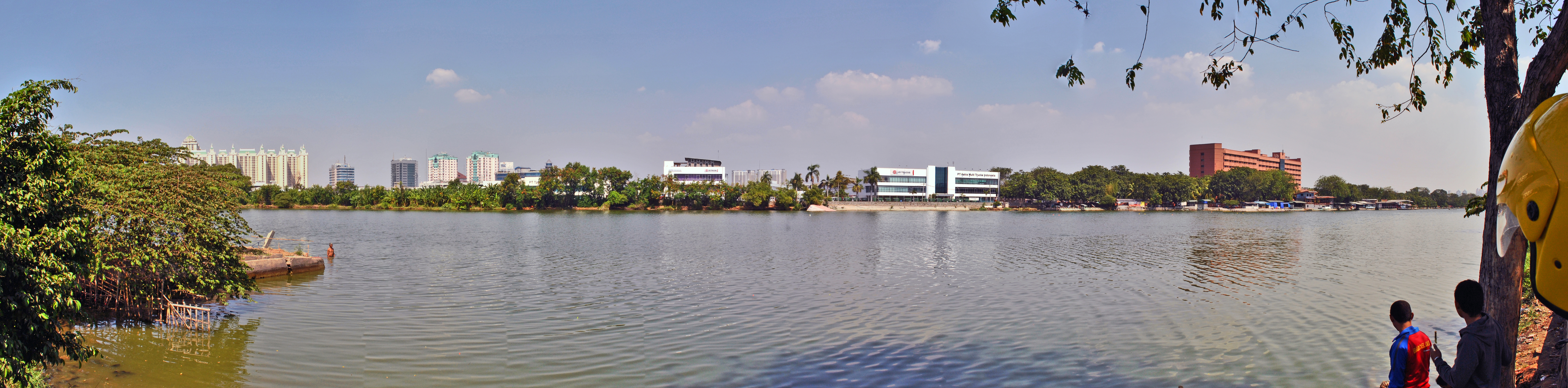
Panoramic view of Sunter Lake

=== Commercial ===
There are numerous shop-house complex, retail supermarket and hypermarket located within the area. Sunter Mall is located within the neighborhood. The area has plenty of warehouse because of its close location to Port of Tanjung Priok and industrial area of Pulo Gadung. The area also has many food courts, hotels, restaurants and cafes.

== Lake Sunter ==
Lake Sunter was built as water reservoirs in the 1970s to mitigate flooding in the area during heavy rain. Lake Sunter has an area of about 33 hectares, and divided into two: Lake Sunter 1 in the west and Sunter 2 in the east. This is not just a geographical division, but also in terms of function.

Lake Sunter 1 functions mainly as a water reservoir. There is a small island less than one hectare in the middle of the lake.

While Lake Sunter 2 (east side) is often also often referred to as Lake Sunter Agung. This area is a recreational area for residents. It is also an arena for water sports enthusiasts, from fishing, water skiing to sightseeing.

== Transport ==
The area is served by TransJakarta corridor 12. Kopaja also has routes to connect the neighborhood with other parts of Jakarta. Kemayoran and Tanjung Priuk railway station of Commuter rail is close to the neighborhood.

== See also ==
- Tanjung Priok
