= Toyota NR engine =

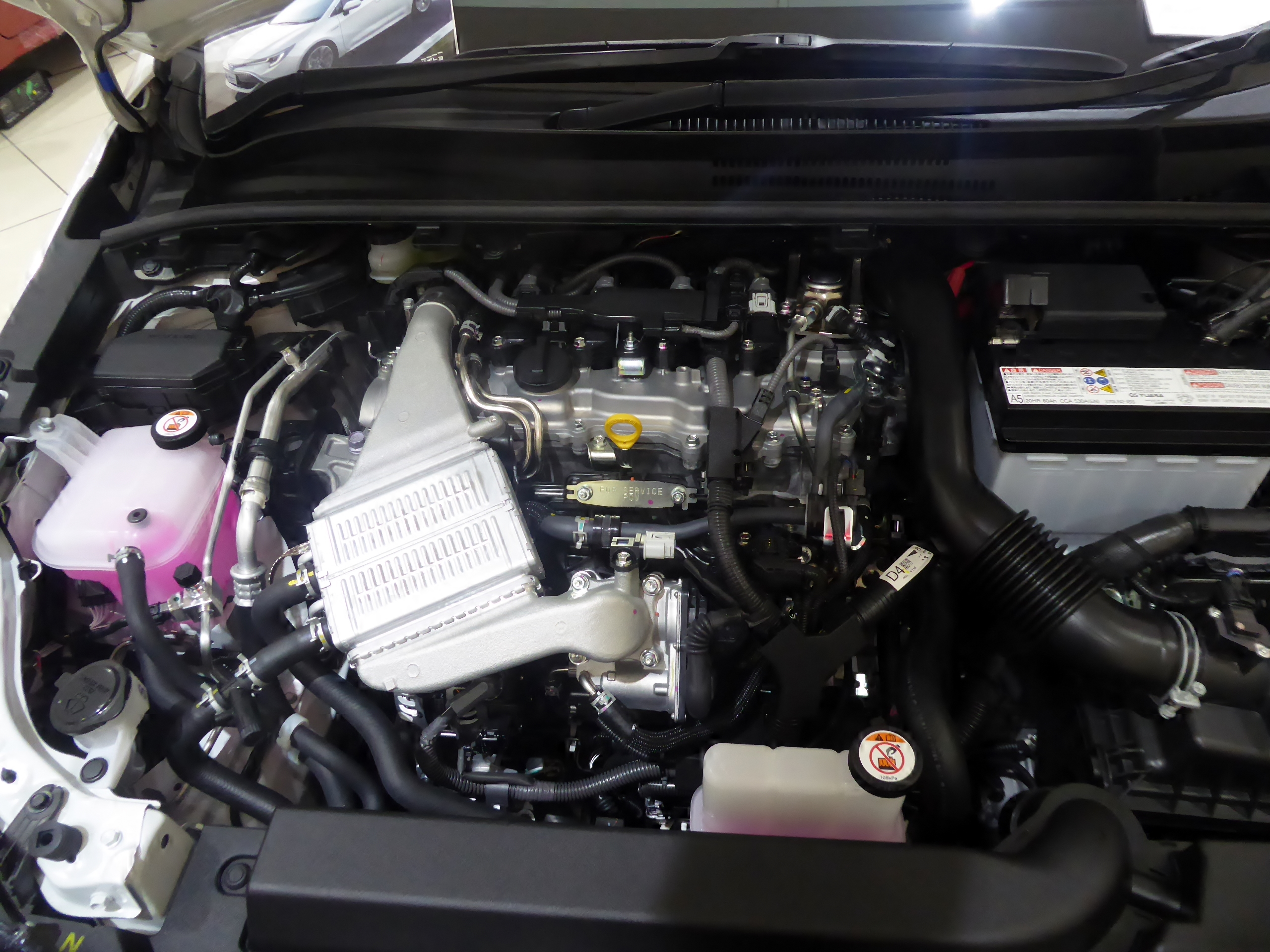
- 8NR-FTS engine

Overview
- Manufacturer: Toyota
- Production: 2008–present

Layout
- Configuration: Inline-4
- Cylinder block material: Aluminium
- Cylinder head material: Aluminium

Combustion
- Fuel system: Electronic fuel injection
- Fuel type: Gasoline
- Cooling system: Water-cooled

Output
- Power output: 65–85 kW (87–114 bhp; 88–116 PS)
- Torque output: 120–185 N⋅m (89–136 lb⋅ft)

Chronology
- Predecessor: Toyota SZ engine (most models); Toyota NZ engine (for 2NR-FE)
- Successor: Toyota M15A engine (I3, for 2NR-FKE); Daihatsu WA engine (I3, for 3NR-VE)

The Toyota NR engine family is a series of small inline-four piston engines designed and manufactured by Toyota, with capacities between 1.2 and 1.5 litres (1,197 and 1,498 cc).

== Common features of this series ==
The NR series uses an aluminium engine block and cylinder head. The valve mechanism is equipped with 4-valves per cylinder, DOHC, and implemented Toyota's Dual VVT-i and VVT-iW. It also uses multi-point or direct fuel injection. The 1NR, 2NR, 3NR, 4NR, 5NR, 6NR, and 7NR engines have Dual VVT-i standard and the 8NR engine has VVT-iW, enabling it to operate in the Otto cycle as well as a modified-Atkinson cycle to improve thermal efficiency.

== 1NR-FE ==
The 1NR-FE is a compact 1.3-litre inline-four piston engine featuring Stop & Start technology and Dual VVT-i. It was introduced into the European market in late 2008 with the Yaris XP9F. Improved engine performance combined with low emissions and fuel consumption was the principal aim during its development.

Advanced engineering has been applied throughout the 1NR-FE engine. Toyota engineers streamlined the engine's intake channel, used computer simulation to optimize airflow, smoothened all surfaces for less turbulence and rounded off all angles and sharp edges inside the engine. One of the key elements of the 1NR-FE engine is its piston design. Smaller and lighter than on the previous 1.3 L (1,297 cc) unit, they are designed with a smaller contact area and use carbon ceramide, an advanced material commonly used in Formula One engineering, to reduce friction. The engine also features cooled exhaust gas recirculation (cold area specification models only) to reduce pumping losses and reduce NO_{x} emissions.

Technical specifications of the engine:

- Displacement: 1.3 L; 81.1 cu in (1,329 cc)
- Bore x Stroke: 72.5 mm × 80.5 mm (2.85 in × 3.17 in)
- Max. Output: Euro 4 Version: 105 PS (104 hp; 77 kW) at 6000 rpm, Euro 5 Version: 73 kW (98 bhp; 99 PS) at 6000 rpm, Indonesia Euro 4 Version: 72 kW (97 bhp; 98 PS) at 6000 rpm, Malaysia version: 71 kW (95 bhp; 97 PS) at 6000 rpm
- Max. Torque: Euro 4 Version: 132 N⋅m (97 lb⋅ft) at 3800 rpm, Euro 5 Version: 128 N⋅m (94 lb⋅ft) at 3800 rpm, Indonesia Euro 4 Version: 120 N⋅m (89 lb⋅ft), Malaysia Version: 121 N⋅m (89 lb⋅ft) at 4000 rpm
- Compression Ratio: 11.5:1; Indonesia Euro 4 Version: 10.5:1
- Valve Mechanism: 16-valve DOHC, Chain Drive (with Dual VVT-i)
- Fuel Injection System: Multi-point fuel injection
- Emission Regulation: Euro 4 (Complies with Euro 5 after optimizations introduced in July 2010)
- Engine Service Mass (incl. coolant & oil): 89.5 kg (197 lb)
- Idling speed: 700 rpm
- Redline: 6200 rpm

Applications:

- Subaru Trezia
- Toyota Auris
- Toyota Corolla
- Toyota Corolla Axio (NRE160) (Japan)
- Toyota Etios (South America)
- Toyota iQ
- Toyota Passo
- Toyota Probox
- Toyota Ractis
- Toyota Urban Cruiser
- Toyota Verso-S
- Toyota Vios (XP150)
- Toyota Yaris (XP150)

== 1NR-VE ==
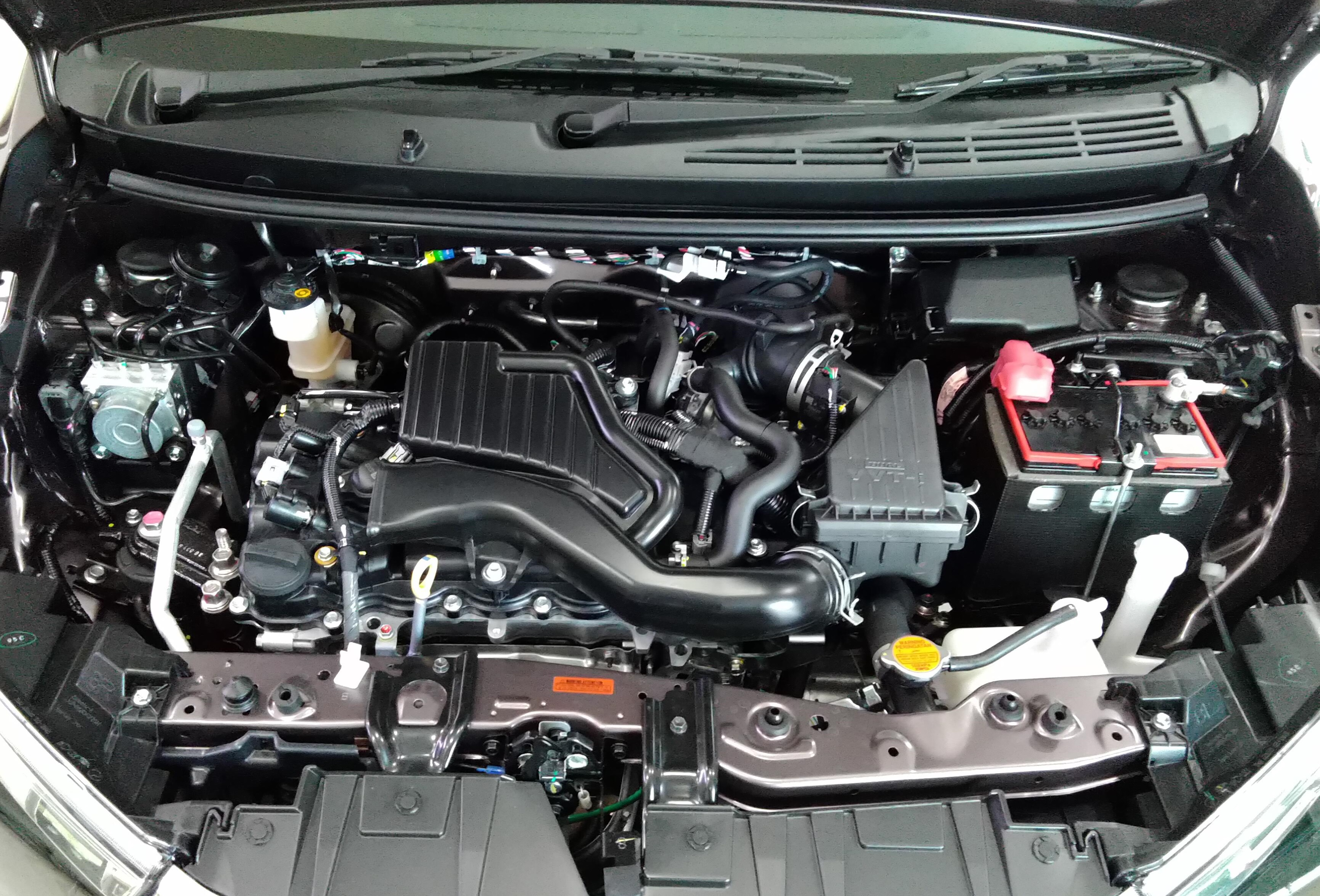
1NR-VE engine on a Perodua Bezza

The new 1NR-VE engine was improvised by Daihatsu for the Toyota Avanza and Daihatsu Xenia, and then later used by Perodua for the Perodua Bezza, which is based on the 1.3-litre 1NR-FE. It has ECE fuel consumption figures of 21.7 km/L (4.6 L/100 km; 51 mpg_{‑US}; 61 mpg_{‑imp}) for the manual variant and 21 km/L (4.8 L/100 km; 49 mpg_{‑US}; 59 mpg_{‑imp}) for the automatic. The engine produces 69–73 kW (93–98 hp) and 121 N⋅m (89 lbf⋅ft) of torque.

The Perodua Bezza Advance variant and all variants of the new third generation Myvi are capable of 22 km/L (4.5 L/100 km; 52 mpg_{‑US}; 62 mpg_{‑imp}), courtesy of the new Eco Idle stop-start system and regenerative braking better than the previous generation engines.

Applications:

- Transversal:
  - Perodua Bezza (B301, 2016–present)
  - Perodua Myvi / Daihatsu Sirion (M800, 2017–present)
  - Toyota Yaris/Vios (NGC101, 2022–present)
  - Toyota Avanza/Transmover / Daihatsu Xenia (W100, 2021–present)
- Longitudinal:
  - Toyota Avanza/Transmover / Daihatsu Xenia (F653, 2015–2023)

== 1NR-FBE ==
Fitted to the Toyota Etios and Yaris hatchback made in Brazil, available only as a flexfuel, 1.3 litre, with VVT-i. Replaced by a flexfuel version of the 1NR-FKE in 2016.

== 1NR-FKE ==
The 1NR-FKE is a variant of the 1NR-FE introduced in the second quarter of 2014. Toyota claims it will have a maximum thermal efficiency of 38 per cent. This 1.3-litre petrol engine is employing the Atkinson cycle like hybrid-dedicated Toyota engines. The maximum torque is lower, but, this time, the maximum output is not reduced. Valves are driven with Variable Valve Timing-intelligent Electric VVT-iE. The intake port has a new shape that generates a strong vertical tumble flow. Combustion is improved, and loss reduced. Toyota says that with idling stop and other functions, it will lead to fuel efficiency gains of approximately 15 per cent.

Main differences between 1NR-FE :

- Max. output: 73 kW (99 PS; 98 bhp) at 6000 rpm
- Max. torque: 121 N⋅m (89 lb⋅ft) at 4400 rpm
- Max. thermal efficiency : 38%
- Expansion ratio: 13.5:1
- Valve mechanism: VVT-iE

Applications:

- Toyota Etios
- Toyota Yaris
- Toyota Vitz after April 2014
- Subaru Trezia after May 2014

== 2NR-FE ==
2NR-FE engine on a Toyota Sienta

A 1.5 L (1,496 cc) variant of the NR series engine, first introduced in the fourth quarter of 2010 for the Toyota Etios. It is the first new engine Toyota developed for over 8 years without VVT-i made to lower costs for the Toyota Etios. A new innovation was introduced to this engine with the integration of the exhaust manifold into the cylinder head to reduce emissions. A Dual VVT-i equipped version was later introduced and first used in Toyota Avanza and in many 1.5L models in the Asian market from the 2017 model year.

Technical specifications of the engine:

- Displacement: 1.5 L (1,496 cc)
- Bore x Stroke: 72.5 mm × 90.6 mm (2.85 in × 3.57 in)
- Max. output:
  - 66 kW (90 PS; 89 bhp) at 5600 rpm (w/o Dual VVT-i)
  - 79 kW (107 PS; 106 bhp) at 6000 rpm (with Dual VVT-i)
- Max. torque:
  - 132 N⋅m (97 lbf⋅ft) at 3000 rpm (w/o Dual VVT-i)
  - 140 N⋅m (103 lbf⋅ft) at 4200 rpm (with Dual VVT-i)
- Compression ratio: 11.5:1; Indonesian Euro 4 version: 10.5:1
- Idling speed: 700 rpm
- Redline: 6200 rpm

Applications:

- Toyota Etios (NGK12/15, 2010–2020)
- Toyota Sienta (NSP170, 2016–2024)
- Toyota Vios/Yaris/Limo (NSP151, 2016–present)

== 2NR-VE ==
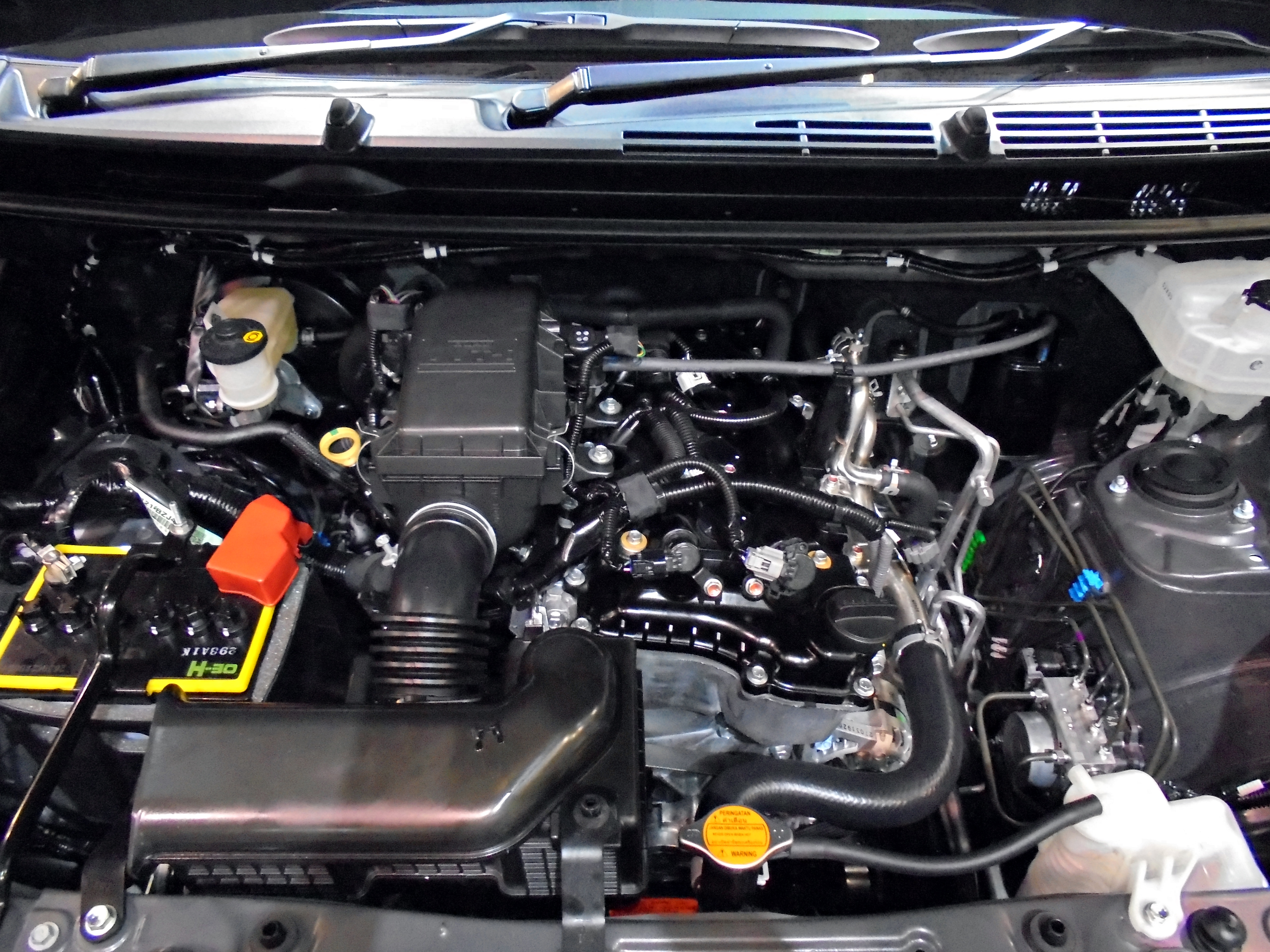
2NR-VE engine on a Toyota Rush (positioned longitudinally)

Based on the 1.5-litre 2NR-FE engine, The 2NR-VE was adapted by Daihatsu for its products and it's also used by Toyota for their products based on Daihatsu New Global Architecture (DNGA). An idle stop-start system is introduced for the Perodua Myvi and Toyota Rush (since 2021) to enhance fuel efficiency. The commercial variant used in the Daihatsu Gran Max has different output adjustment but still features Dual VVT-i.

Max. output:

- 97–106 PS (71–78 kW; 96–105 hp) at 6000 rpm

Max. torque:

- 134–140 N⋅m (99–103 lbf⋅ft) at 4200-4400 rpm

Compression Ratio: 11.5:1; Indonesian Euro 4 version: 10.5:1

Applications:

- Transversal:
  - Perodua Myvi / Daihatsu Sirion (M801, 2017–present)
  - Toyota Avanza / Daihatsu Xenia (W101, 2021–present)
  - Toyota Veloz (W101/W151, 2021–present)
  - Perodua Alza (W151, 2022–present)
  - Toyota Yaris/Vios (NGC102, 2022–present)
  - Toyota Yaris Cross / Perodua Traz (NGC200, 2023–present)
- Longitudinal:
  - Toyota Avanza / Daihatsu Xenia (F654, 2015–2021)
  - Daihatsu Terios / Toyota Rush (F800, 2017–present) / Perodua Aruz (F850, 2019–present)
  - Toyota TownAce / Daihatsu Gran Max / Mazda Bongo (S403/S413, 2020–present)

== 2NR-VEX ==
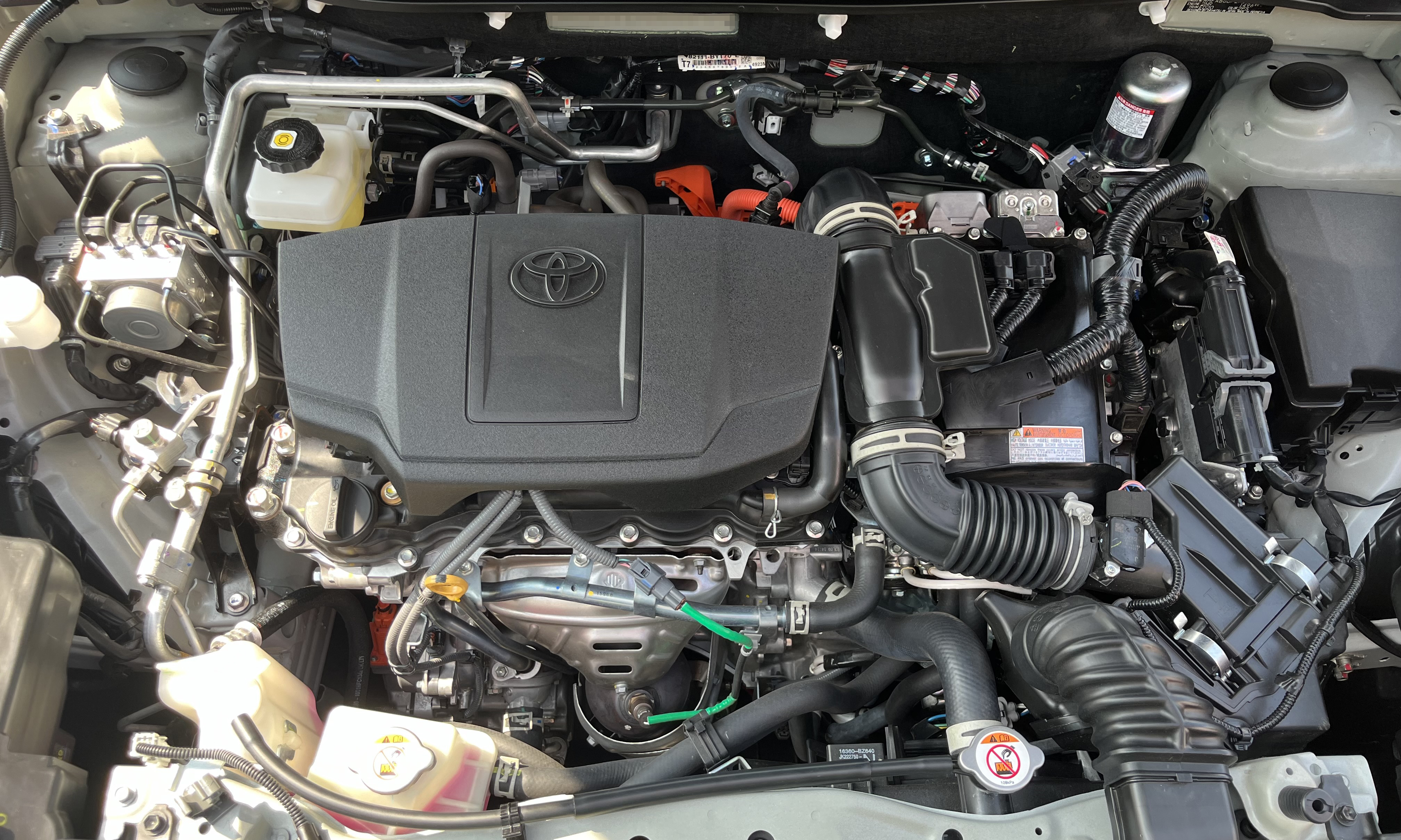
2NR-VEX engine on a Toyota Yaris Cross

Based on the 1.5-litre 2NR-VE engine, the 2NR-VEX unit is an Atkinson cycle engine used with a hybrid system paired with an electric motor and a lithium-ion battery.

Maximum output:

- 67 kW (90 hp; 91 PS)

Maximum torque:

- 121 N⋅m (89 lb⋅ft)

Applications:

- Toyota Yaris Cross Hybrid (NYC200, 2023–present)
- Toyota Vios / Yaris Ativ Hybrid (NYC100, 2025–present)
- Toyota Veloz Hybrid (W102, 2025–present)

== 2NR-FBE ==
A flex fuel engine for Etios and Yaris in Brazil. It can run on gasoline or any mixture of gasoline and ethanol, up to full ethanol (E100).

Main differences between 2NR-FE:

- Max. Power output: 108 bhp (81 kW; 109 PS) at 5600 rpm
- Max. Torque: 149 N⋅m (110 lbf⋅ft) at 4000 rpm

Applications:

- Toyota Etios (Brazil only)
- Toyota Yaris (Brazil only)
- Toyota Vios (2016–present)

== 2NR-FKE ==
Implements variable valve timing system VVT-iE and engine operation by Miller / Atkinson cycle.

Main differences between 2NR-FE :

- Max. Output: 109 PS (80 kW; 108 bhp) at 6000 rpm
- Max. Torque: 136 N⋅m (100 lb⋅ft) at 4400 rpm
- Compression ratio: 13.5:1

Applications:

- Toyota Corolla Axio (April 2015 – present)
- Toyota Porte/Spade (XP140) (2015–2020)
- Toyota Sienta (Japan, 2015–present)
- Toyota Yaris (Europe, 2017–2020)

== 3NR-FE ==
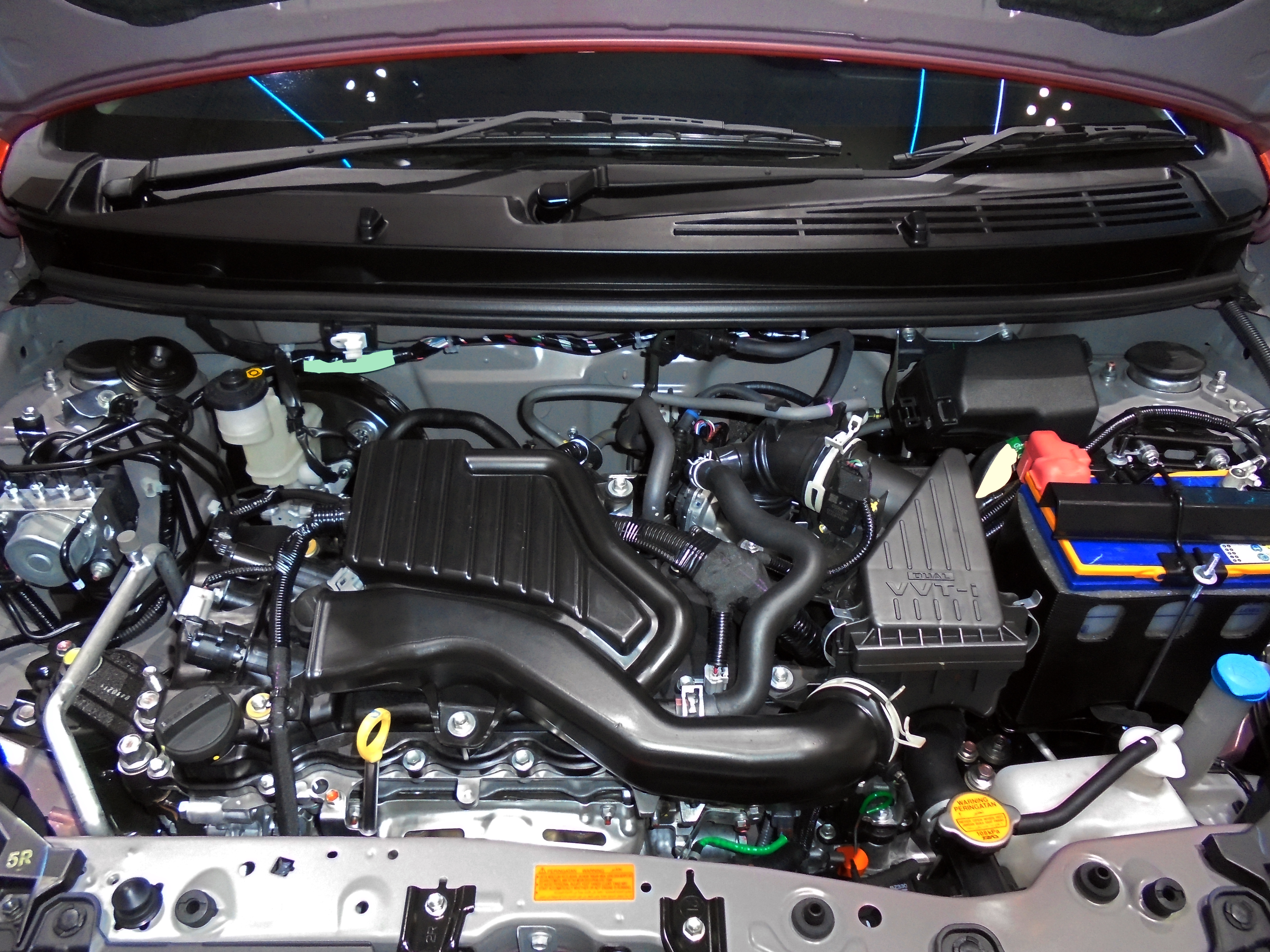
3NR-VE engine on a Daihatsu Ayla

A 1.2 L (1,197 cc) variant of the NR series engine. First introduced in the second quarter of 2011 for the Etios Liva. Toyota later implemented Dual VVT-i mechanism and increased the compression ratio to 11.5:1 for Toyota Yaris models (Thailand).

Technical specifications of the engine:

- Displacement: 1.2 L (1,197 cc)
- Bore x Stroke: 72.5 mm × 72.5 mm (2.85 in × 2.85 in)
- Max. Output: 88 PS (65 kW; 87 bhp) at 5600 rpm / 88 PS (65 kW; 87 bhp) at 6000 rpm (with Dual VVT-i)
- Max. Torque: 104 N⋅m (77 lbf⋅ft) at 3100 rpm / 108 N⋅m (80 lbf⋅ft) at 4200 rpm (with Dual VVT-i)
- Compression ratio 11.5:1; Indonesia

Applications:

- Toyota Etios (NGK10)
- Toyota Yaris (XP150) (NSP152, 2013–2019; Thailand)
- Toyota Yaris Ativ (XP150) (NSP152, 2017–2019; Thailand)

== 3NR-VE ==
A Daihatsu variant of the 3NR-FE. Some technologies used in the Daihatsu-made 3NR-VE engine are:

- The application of intake valve type roller rocker arm, which reduces the friction produced when the camshaft is running.
- The application of Dual VVT-i system, which adjusts timing on both intake and exhaust camshafts.
- Improved cylinder head design.
- Longer intake valve, which improves lower-end torque.
- Compatible with E20 fuel (Dual VVT-iE version)

Technical specifications of the engine:

- Displacement: 1.2 L (1,197 cc)
- Bore x Stroke: 72.5 mm × 72.5 mm (2.85 in × 2.85 in)
- Max. Output: 88 PS (65 kW; 87 bhp) at 6000 rpm (with Dual VVT-i); 94 PS (69 kW; 93 bhp) at 6000 rpm (with Dual VVT-iE)
- Max. Torque 108 N⋅m (80 lbf⋅ft) at 4200 rpm (with Dual VVT-i); 110 N⋅m (81 lbf⋅ft) at 4400 rpm (with Dual VVT-iE)
- Compression ratio: 10.3:1 (with Dual VVT-i); 13.5:1 (with Dual VVT-iE)

Applications:

- Toyota Calya / Daihatsu Sigra (B401, 2017–present)
- Toyota Agya / Daihatsu Ayla (B101, 2017–2023)
- Toyota Yaris Ativ (NGC100, 2022–present, with Dual VVT-iE)

== 3NR-FKE ==
Implements variable valve timing system VVT-iE and engine operation by Miller / Atkinson cycle.

Main differences between 3NR-FE:

- Max. Output: 92 PS (68 kW; 91 bhp) at 6000 rpm
- Max. Torque: 109 N⋅m (80 lb⋅ft) at 4400 rpm
- Expansion ratio: 13.5:1
- CO_{2} output: 99 g/km
- Fuel consumption: 23.25 km/L (54.7 mpg_{‑US})

Applications:

- Toyota Yaris (XP150) (Thailand, 2019–present)
- Toyota Yaris Ativ (XP150) (Thailand, 2019–2022)

== 4NR-FE ==
A 1.3 L (1,329 cc) variant of the NR series engine. First introduced for the third generation Toyota Vios.

Technical specifications of the engine:

- Displacement: 1.3 L (1,329 cc)
- Max. Output: 99 PS (73 kW; 98 bhp) at 6000 rpm
- Max. Torque: 123 N⋅m (91 lbf⋅ft) at 4200 rpm

Applications:

- Toyota Vios (NCP150) (China only)

== 5NR-FE ==
A 1.5 L (1,496 cc) variant of the NR series engine. First introduced for the third generation Toyota Vios.

Technical specifications of the engine:

- Displacement: 1.5 L (1,496 cc)
- Max. Output: 107 PS (79 kW; 106 bhp) at 6000 rpm
- Max. Torque: 140 N⋅m (103 lbf⋅ft) at 4200 rpm

Applications:

- Toyota Vios (NCP150) (China only)

== 6NR-FE ==
A 1.3 L (1,329 cc) variant of the NR series engine. First introduced for the third generation Toyota Yaris.

Technical specifications of the engine:

- Displacement: 1.3 L (1,329 cc)
- Max. Output: 99 PS (73 kW; 98 bhp) at 6000 rpm
- Max. Torque: 123 N⋅m (91 lbf⋅ft) at 4200 rpm

Applications:

- Toyota Yaris (XP150) (China only)

== 7NR-FE ==
A 1.5 L (1,498 cc) variant of the NR series engine. First introduced for the third generation Toyota Yaris.

Technical specifications of the engine:

- Displacement: 1.5 L (1,498 cc)
- Max. Output: 107 PS (79 kW; 106 bhp) at 6000 rpm
- Max. Torque: 140 N⋅m (103 lbf⋅ft) at 4200 rpm

Applications:

- Toyota Yaris (XP150) (China only)

== 8NR-FTS ==
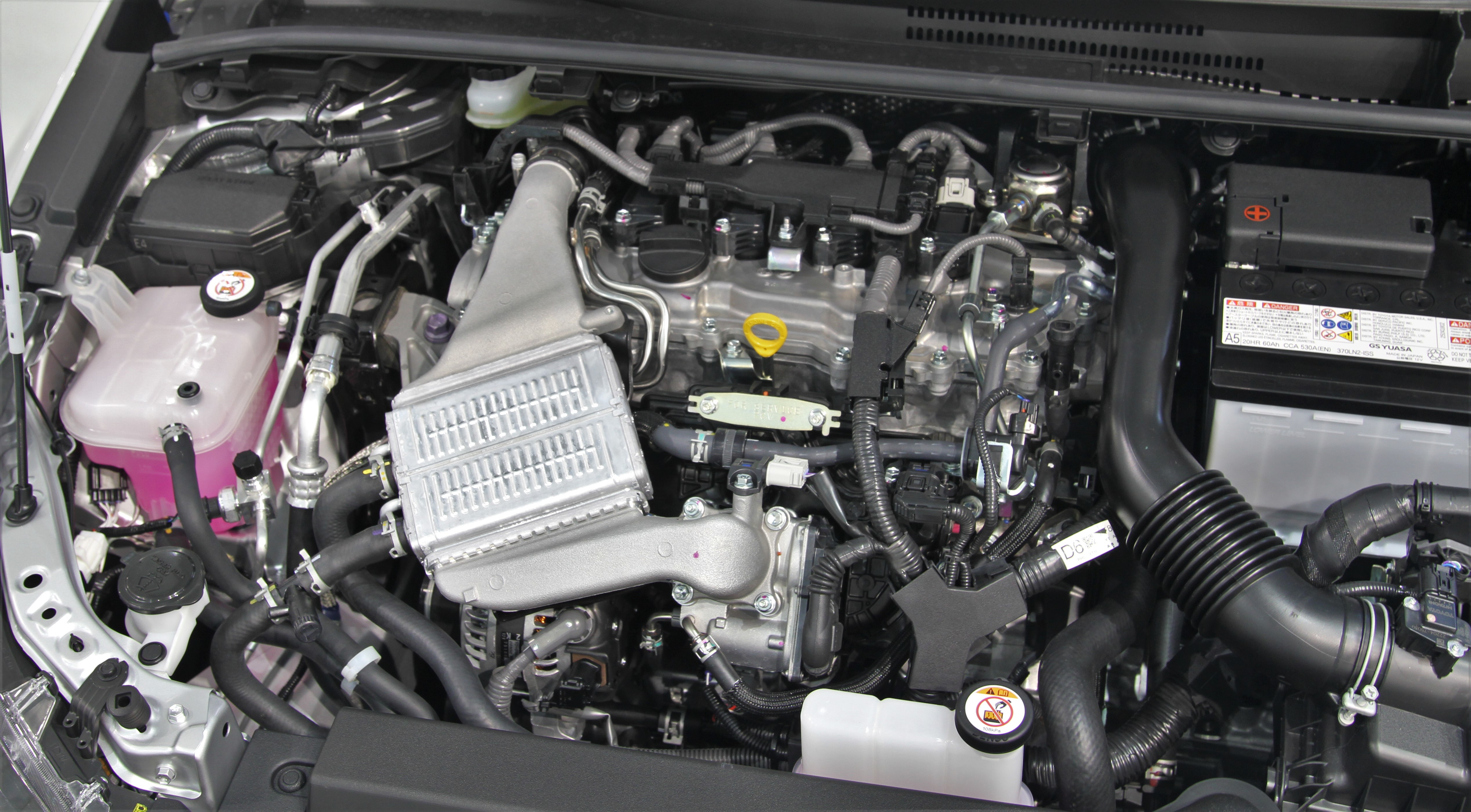
8NR-FTS

A 1.2 L (1,197 cc) turbocharged variant of the NR series engine. First introduced in the Toyota Auris in 2015. It uses direct injection.

Technical specifications:

- Displacement: 1.2 L (1,197 cc)
- Bore x Stroke: 71.5 mm × 74.5 mm (2.81 in × 2.93 in)
- Max. Output: 85 kW (116 PS; 114 hp) at 5200-5600 rpm
- Max. Torque: 185 N⋅m (136 lbf⋅ft) at 1500-4000 rpm
- Max. thermal efficiency: > 36%
- Compression ratio: 10.0:1
- Valve Mechanism: VVT-iW

Applications:

- Toyota Auris (E180)
- Toyota C-HR
- Toyota Corolla (E210)

== 9NR-FTS ==
A version of 8NR-FTS built for Chinese-market Corolla/Levin.

Technical specifications:

- Displacement: 1.2 L (1,197 cc)
- Bore x Stroke: 71.5 mm × 74.5 mm (2.81 in × 2.93 in)
- Max. Output: 85 kW (116 PS; 114 hp) at 5200 rpm
- Max. Torque: 185 N⋅m (136 lbf⋅ft) at 1500 rpm
- Max. thermal efficiency: > 36%
- Compression ratio: 10.0:1
- Valve Mechanism: VVT-iW

Applications:

- Toyota Corolla/Levin (E180, China)
- Toyota Corolla/Levin (E210, China)
