= Daihatsu Hijet =

Kei truck/microvan produced by Daihatsu

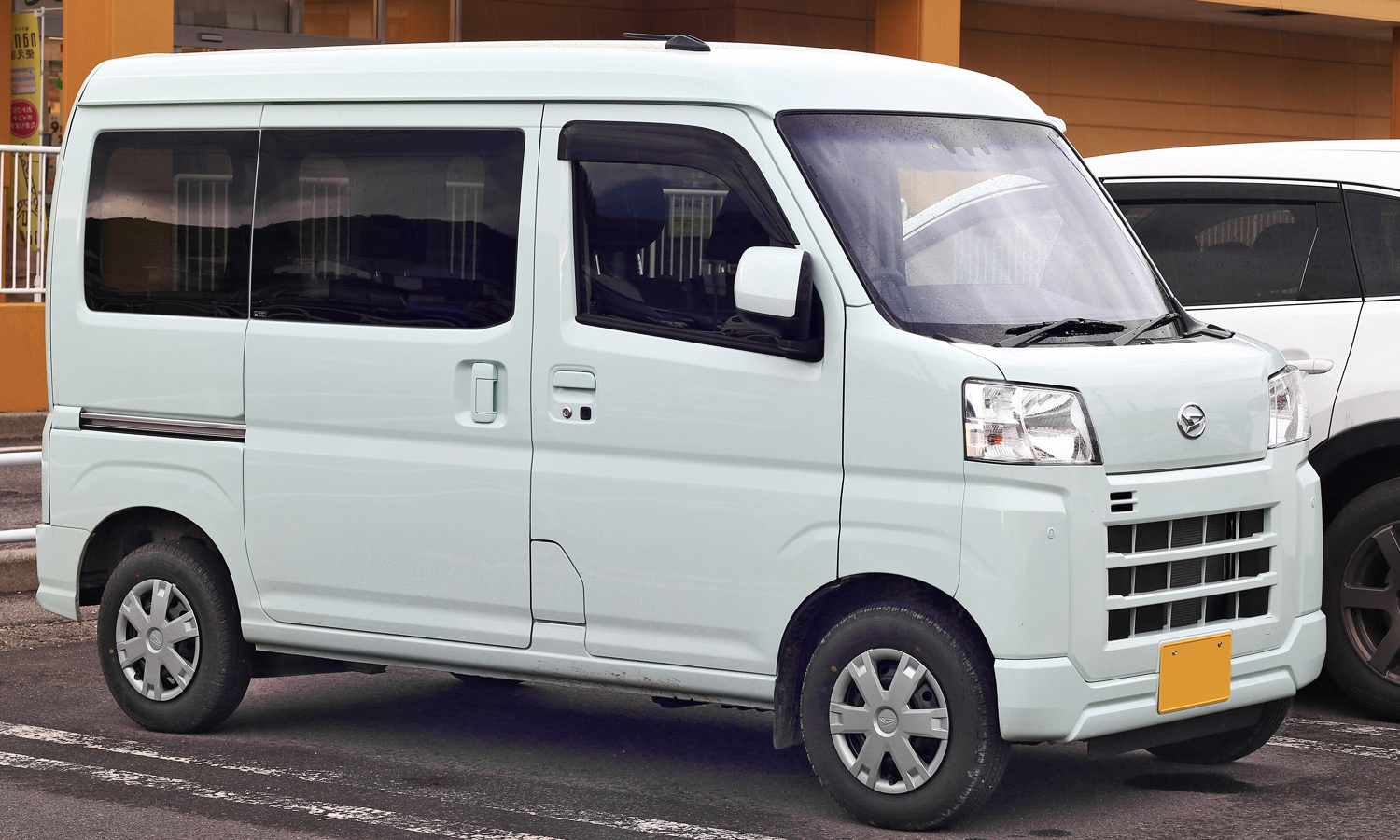
- 2022 Daihatsu Hijet Cargo Cruise (S700V)

Overview
- Manufacturer: Daihatsu
- Also called: Daihatsu Atrai; Piaggio Porter; Toyota Sparky; Toyota Pixis Truck/Van
- Production: November 1960 – present
- Assembly: Japan: Ikeda, Osaka (Ikeda plant); Nakatsu, Ōita (Daihatsu Auto Body/Daihatsu Motor Kyushu, 2004–present)

Body and chassis
- Class: Kei truck; Microvan; Light commercial vehicle (outside Japan)
- Body style: Pickup truck; Van

The Daihatsu Hijet (Japanese: ダイハツ・ハイゼット, Hepburn: Daihatsu Haizetto), is a cab over microvan and kei truck produced and sold by the Japanese automaker Daihatsu since 1960. The Daihatsu Atrai (Japanese: ダイハツ・アトレー, Hepburn: Daihatsu Atorē), a passenger-specific version, was introduced in 1981. Despite the similarities between the Hijet name and Toyota's naming scheme for its trucks and vans (HiAce and Hilux), the name "Hijet" has been in use for Daihatsu's kei trucks and microvans since 1960, over two decades before Toyota took control. "Hijet", when transliterated into Japanese, is very similar to "Midget", one of Daihatsu's other mini-trucks. According to Daihatsu, the name "Hijet" was created to imply that the vehicle offers higher performance than the Midget. The Hijet competes in Japan with the Honda Acty, Mitsubishi Minicab, Nissan Clipper, Subaru Sambar and Suzuki Carry.

By November 2020, around 7.4 million Hijets had been sold in Japan.

== History ==
The first Hijet received a 360 cc two-stroke engine, as was dictated by the kei car laws of the time. The Hijet's development has long followed the evolution of Japan's kei regulations, with an increase to 550 cc in 1976 and then 660 cc for 1990. Exterior dimensions also increased from 3.0 m × 1.3 m (118 in × 51 in) to 3.4 m × 1.475 m (134 in × 58 in) as the regulations changed over the years. Export versions have usually been slightly larger as bigger bumpers and sometimes wider bodies are fitted. During 1980, the two millionth Hijet was built.

== First generation (L35/L36) ==
Series L35 (pickup) and L36 (van)
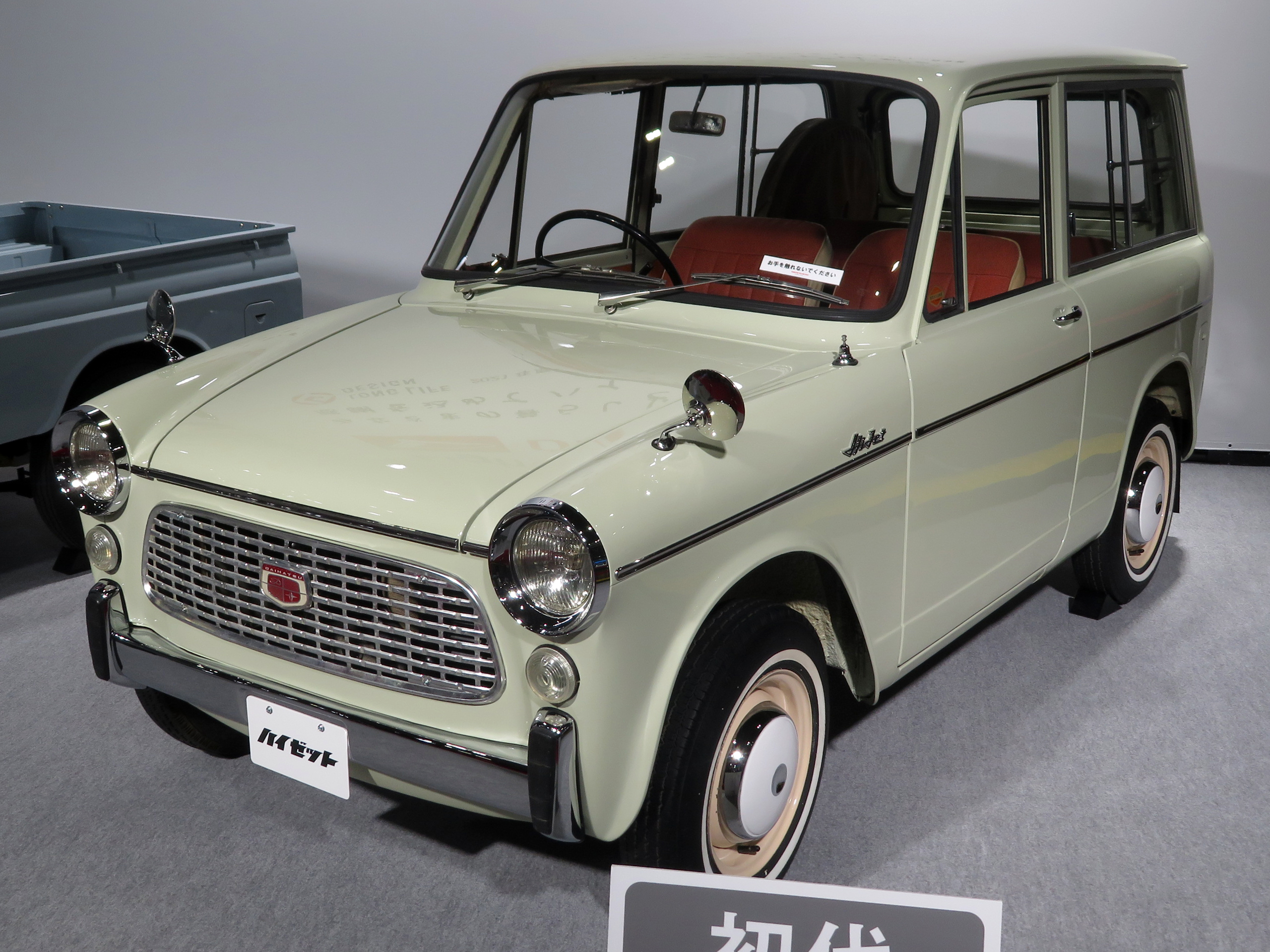
- Daihatsu Hijet Lite-Van

Overview
- Production: November 1960 – 1966

Body and chassis
- Class: Kei truck; Microvan
- Body style: Van; Pickup truck
- Layout: front-engine, rear-wheel drive
- Related: Daihatsu Fellow (L37); Daihatsu New Line

Powertrain
- Engine: Gasoline: 356 cc ZL air-cooled two-stroke I2; 356 cc ZM two-stroke I2
- Transmission: 3-speed manual

Dimensions
- Length: 2,995 mm (117.9 in)
- Width: 1,295 mm (51.0 in)
- Height: 1,615 mm (63.6 in)

The first vehicle to bear the name Hijet from Daihatsu was a kei truck in November 1960, with the enclosed light van model following in May 1961. The first generation Hijet used a conventional front engine, rear-wheel-drive format with the driver sitting behind the engine, in a similar pickup fashion. The exterior dimensions and engine displacement were in compliance with "kei class" regulations in Japan at its introduction. The 356 cc engine produced 17 PS (12.5 kW), making for a top speed of 75 km/h (47 mph) with a 3-speed manual, typical numbers for the class at the time. In 1964, the Hijet received a facelift, replacing its body-colored grille with a more conventional chromed unit and the engine layout was changed to cab-over.

A heavier duty model of the Hijet, the New-Line (L50P/L50V), arrived in January 1963. It was a half-meter (20 in) longer and could carry 500 kg (1,102 lb) thanks to a larger, 800 cc engine with 41 PS (30 kW). Developed with an eye to export markets, this car did not meet the strict kei car standards of the time and sold only in small numbers. When the first generation Hijet was replaced in February 1966, the New-Line was discontinued.

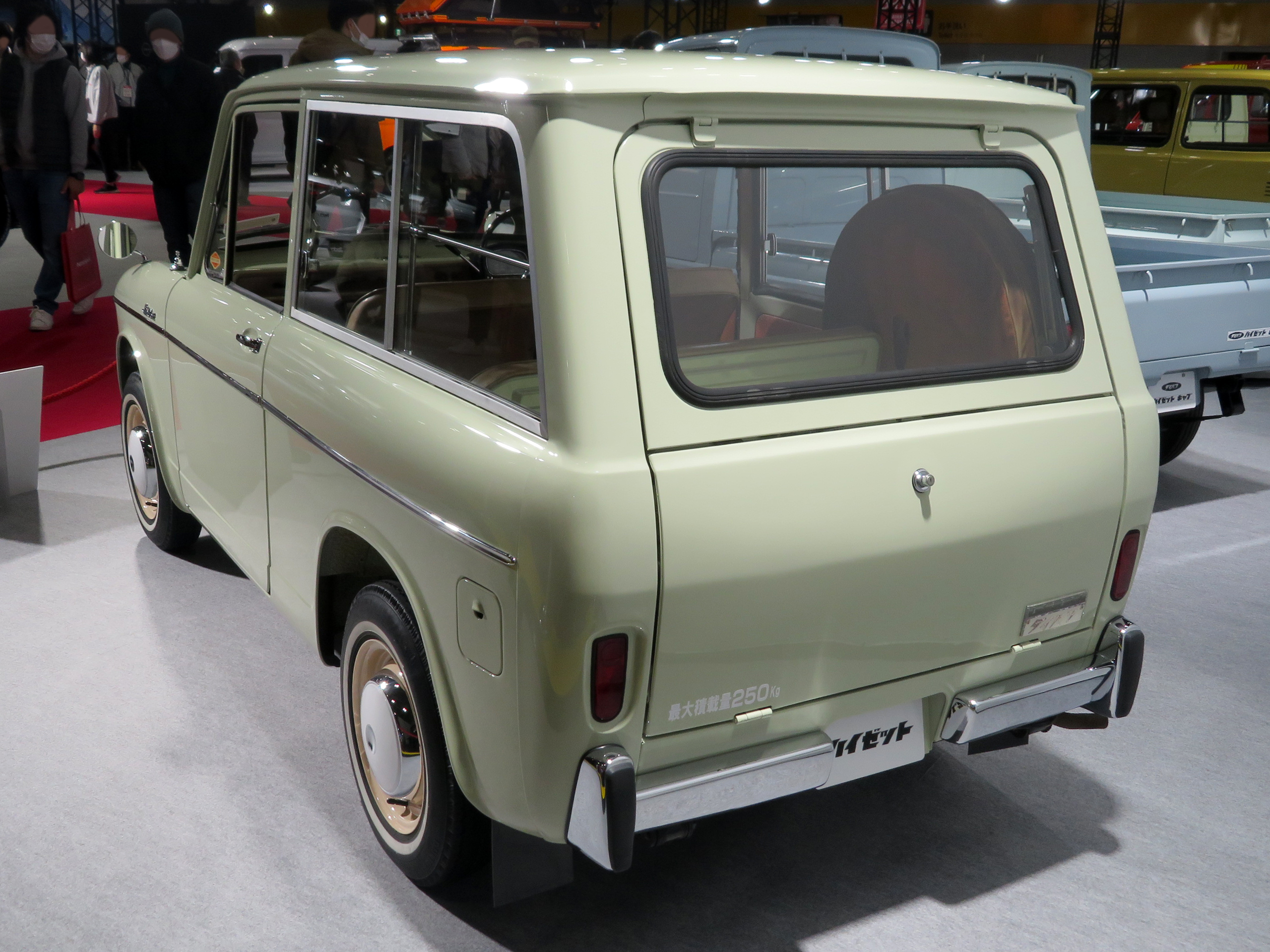
Hijet Lite-Van rear view

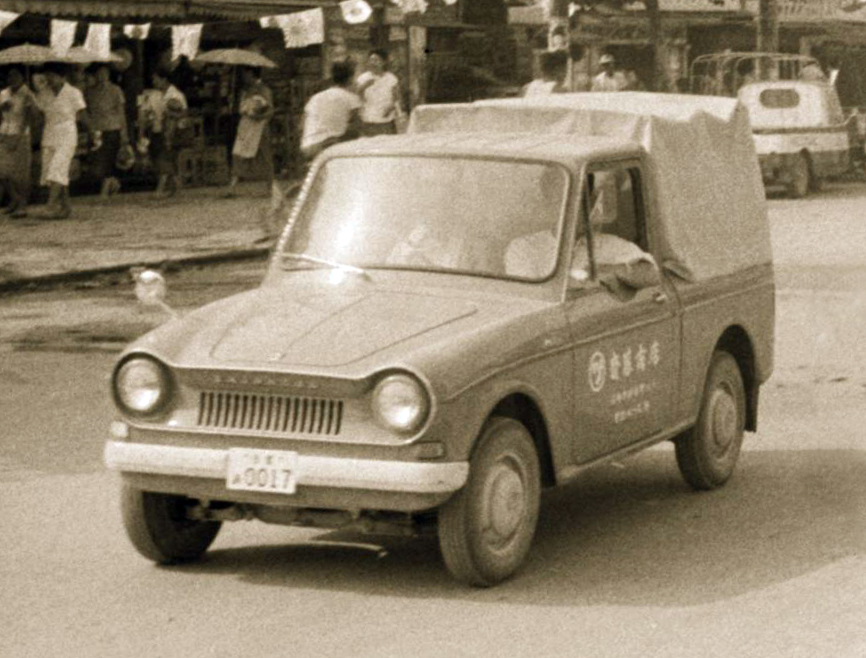
The pre-facelift Hijet in a period photo

== Second generation (S35/S36) ==
Daihatsu Hijet S35 (truck), S36 (van)
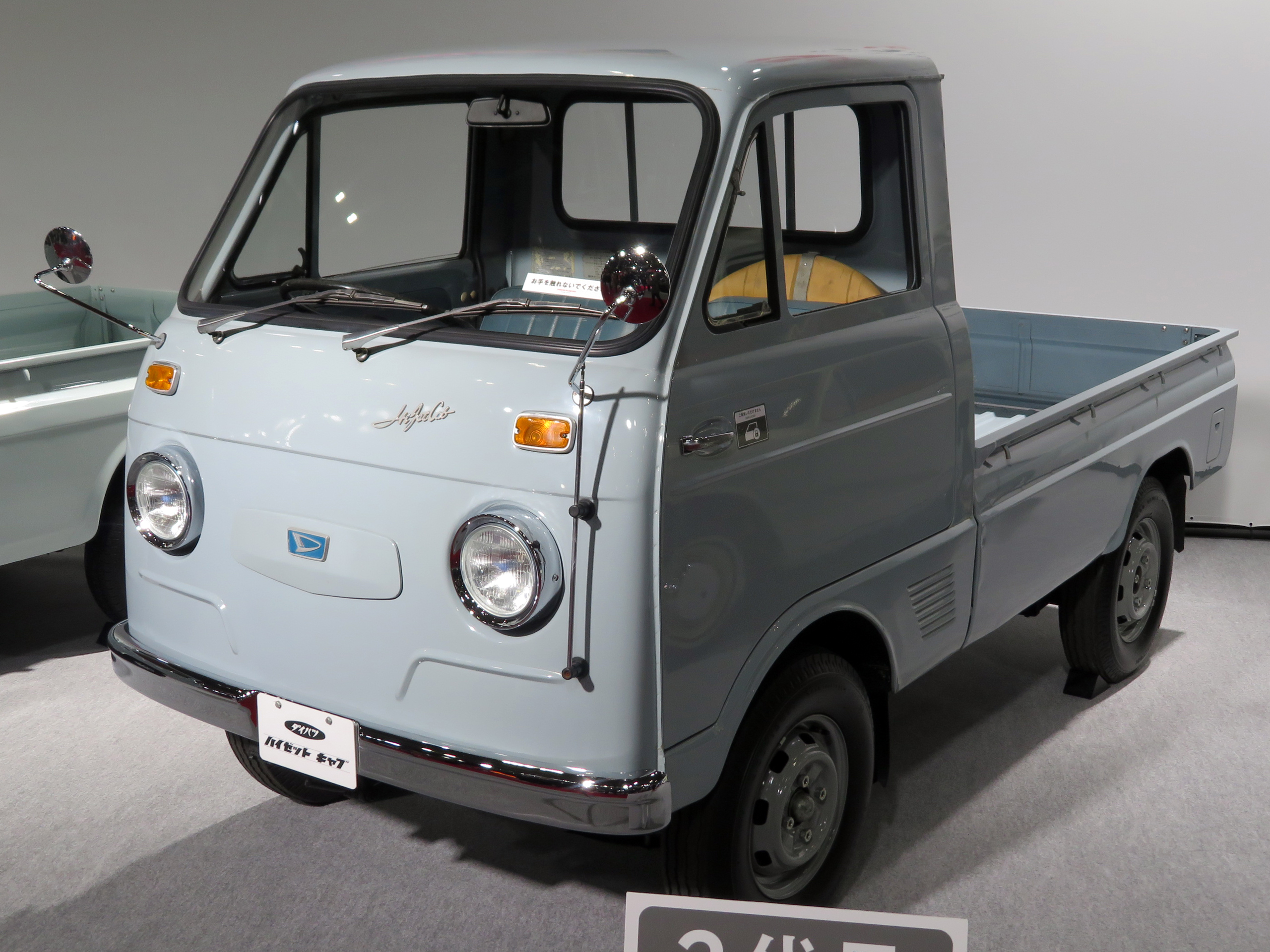
- Daihatsu Hijet cabover truck

Overview
- Production: 1964–1968

Body and chassis
- Class: kei truck
- Body style: Van; Pickup truck
- Layout: mid-engine, rear-wheel drive
- Related: New Line Cab

Powertrain
- Engine: Gasoline: 356 cc ZM two-stroke I2 (water-cooled)
- Transmission: 3-speed manual

Dimensions
- Length: 2,995 mm (117.9 in)
- Width: 1,295 mm (51.0 in)
- Height: 1,615 mm (64 in)

To maximize cargo carrying space while still staying in the "kei" class regulations, a cabover approach was adopted in 1964, offering buyers the choice between the first generation style or the cabover approach. This generation appearance was also introduced as the larger "New Line Cab" Daihatsu cabover truck (S50, S50T), replacing the earlier L50 New Line. As for its predecessor, it shared its engine with the Daihatsu Compagno. The New Line Cab was built from February 1966 until March 1968.

The cabover bodystyle approach appeared after the 1950 Volkswagen Type 2, the 1961 Ford Econoline, the 1961 Chevrolet Greenbrier, and during the same year as the Dodge A100.

== Third generation (S37) ==
Daihatsu Hijet S37
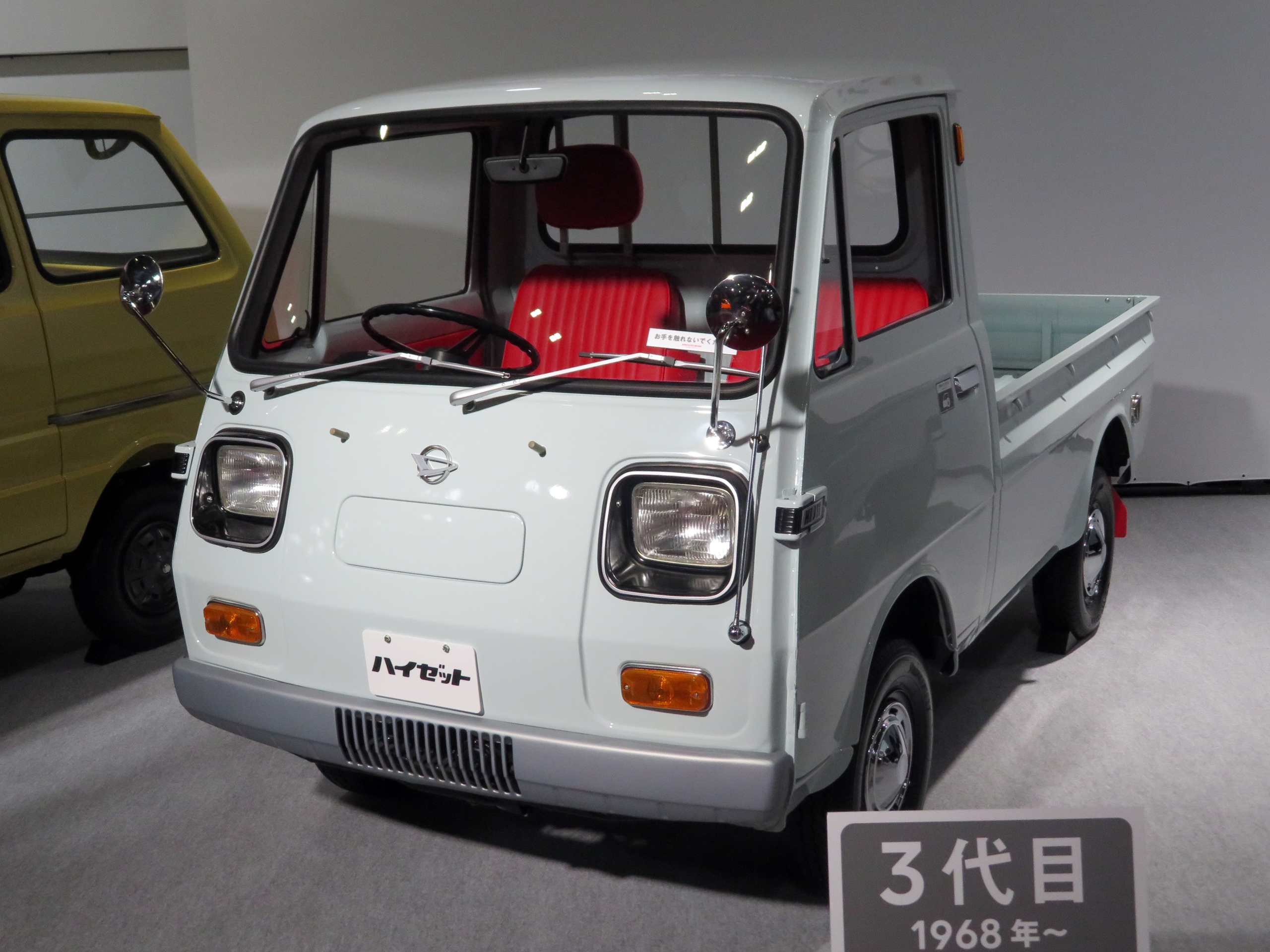
- Daihatsu Hijet cabover truck (1968)

Overview
- Production: 1968–1972

Body and chassis
- Class: kei truck; microvan
- Body style: Van; Pickup truck
- Layout: mid-engine, rear-wheel drive

Powertrain
- Engine: Gasoline: 356 cc ZM I two-stroke I2 (water-cooled)
- Transmission: 4-speed manual

Dimensions
- Length: 2,995 mm (117.9 in)
- Width: 1,295 mm (51.0 in)
- Height: 1,570–1,620 mm (61.8–63.8 in)

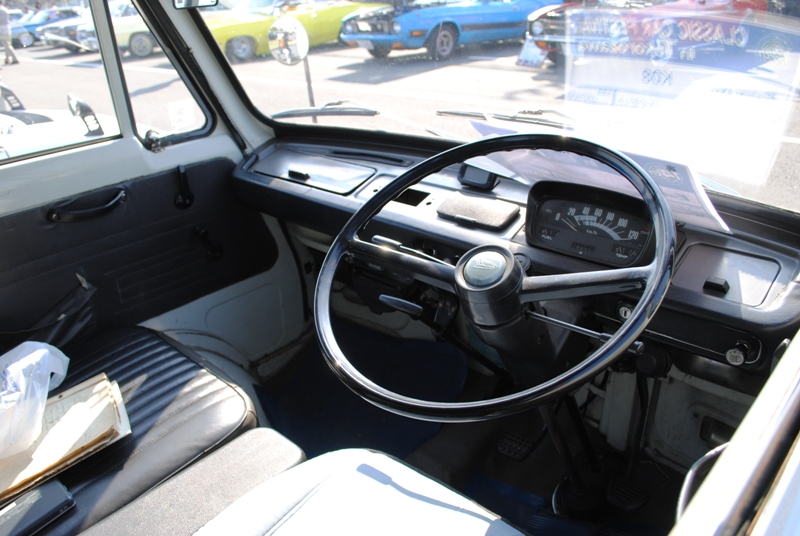
S37 interior

The first model change consisted mostly of minor improvements. The appearance became boxier overall, with a more wedgy appearance and square headlights in prominent dark-colored shrouds. The front doors became hinged in the modern manner as opposed to the earlier rear-hinged doors. The ZM I engine produced 23 PS (17 kW) at 5000 rpm and was capable of accelerating the Hijet (truck or van) to a top speed of 85 km/h (53 mph). This generation was also offered as an all-electric truck and van.

== Fourth generation (S38/S40) ==
Daihatsu Hijet S38/S40
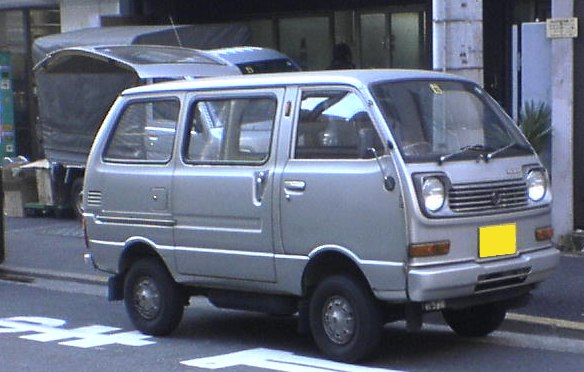
- S40 series Van (550)

Overview
- Also called: Daihatsu 360/550 Cab
- Production: September 1971 – August 1981

Body and chassis
- Class: kei truck; microvan
- Body style: Van; Pickup truck
- Layout: mid-engine, rear-wheel drive
- Platform: S38/S40

Powertrain
- Engine: Gasoline: 356 cc ZM two-stroke I2; 547 cc AB20 OHC I2
- Transmission: 4-speed manual

Dimensions
- Wheelbase: 1,680 mm (66 in)
- Length: 2,995 mm (117.9 in) (until 1976); 3,045 mm (119.9 in) (post-1976 truck); 3,090 mm (121.7 in) (post-1976 Van)
- Width: 1,295 mm (51.0 in)
- Height: 1,615 mm (63.6 in)

In September 1971, the fourth generation Hijet appeared, with all-new sheetmetal, initially available only as a truck. The engine remained the ZM 360 cc two-stroke two-cylinder, while the rear suspension reverted to a live, leaf-sprung unit. In February 1972, a new Van was presented, originally marketed as the "Slide Van" as it now featured sliding doors on both sides in addition to a top-hinged tailgate. In September 1974, the front clip and rear bumper underwent light changes to accommodate full-size yellow license plates (hitherto, kei cars had been equipped with smaller plates than normal).

In October 1976, the four-stroke Hijet 550 appeared, with the new 550 cc AB20 engine taking full advantage of the recent new kei regulations. Bigger bumpers meant that all Hijets built after this date are slightly longer, as the 360 received the same external changes simultaneously, including a new front clip. To reflect the new engine, the 550 received the new chassis code "S40". In export trim, where it was sold as the Daihatsu 550 Cab and Cab-Van, this engine has 30 PS (22 kW) at 5,500 rpm, and 4.2 kg⋅m (41 N⋅m; 30 lb⋅ft) at 4,000 rpm. The 550 Van had an advantage of a higher carrying capacity than the 360 Van, at 350 rather than 300 kg (772 and 661 lb respectively).

Less than a year after the introduction of the 550, the wider and longer Hijet Wide 55 (S60) appeared, but the Hijet 550 continued in production and even underwent a facelift in April 1979 and now carried a blacked out grille. In April 1981, the four-stroke S40 Hijet 550 was discontinued, but the two-stroke S38 continued to be available until August 1981 as a low-cost version (by which time the sixth generation Hijet was already on sale). The later ZM-engined versions had 24 PS (18 kW). The two-stroke was also popular in many Southeast Asian markets, where emissions regulations were more lax and its lower purchasing price had a bigger impact.

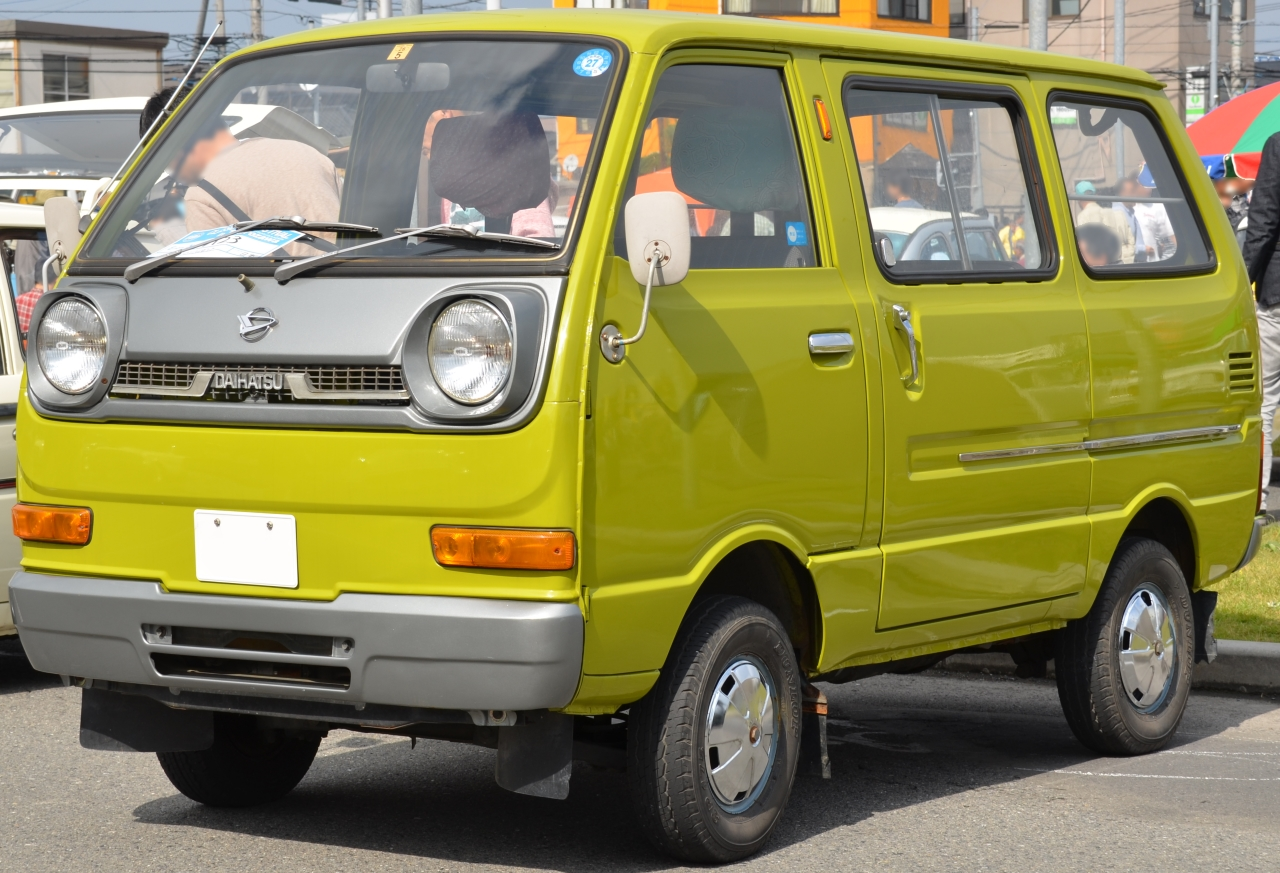
Daihatsu Hijet 360 Van (S38)

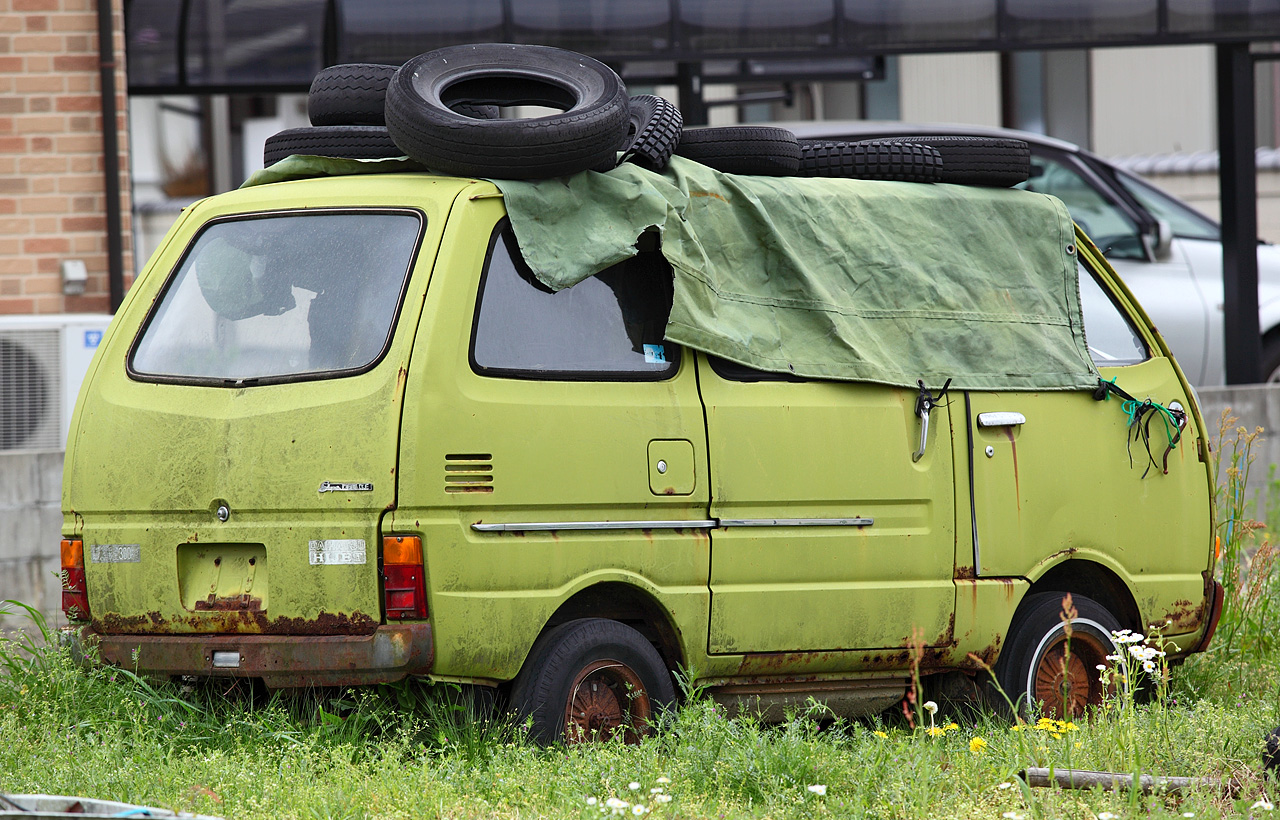
Daihatsu Hijet 360 Van (S38)

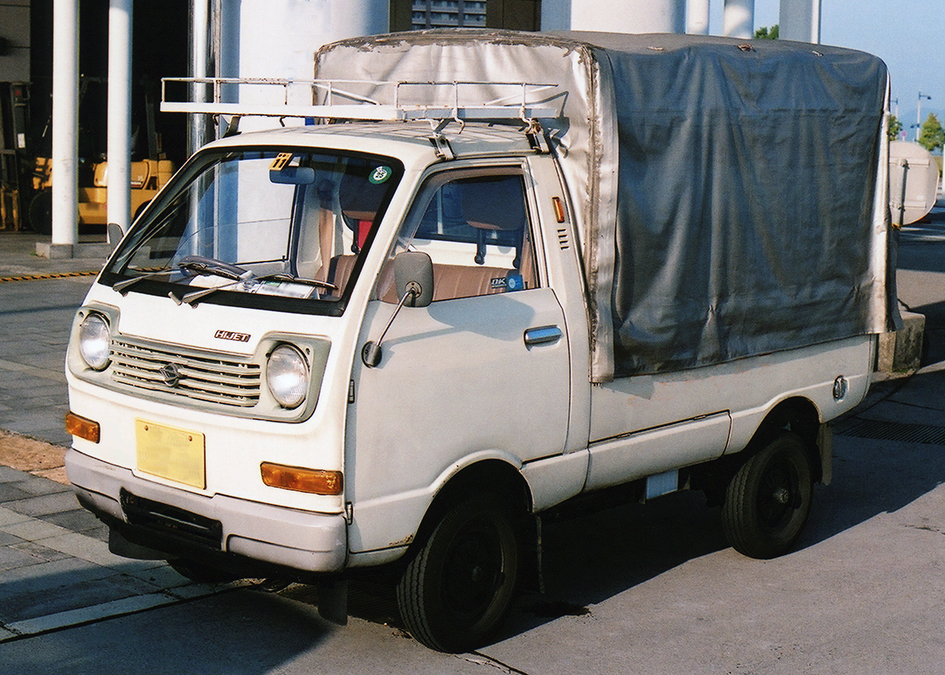
Daihatsu Hijet 360 Truck (S38)

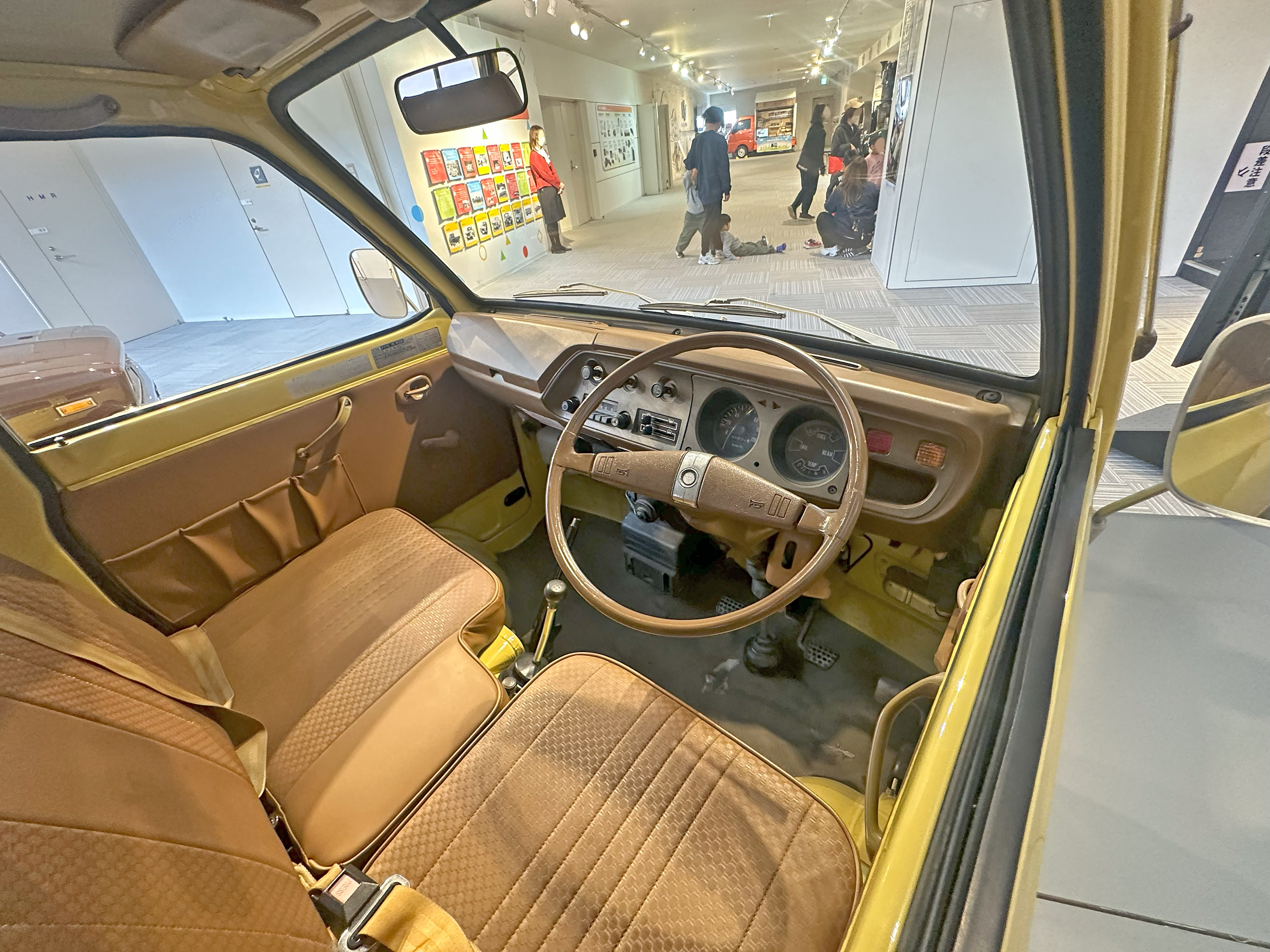
Interior (S38)

== Fifth generation (S60) ==
Daihatsu Hijet Wide 55
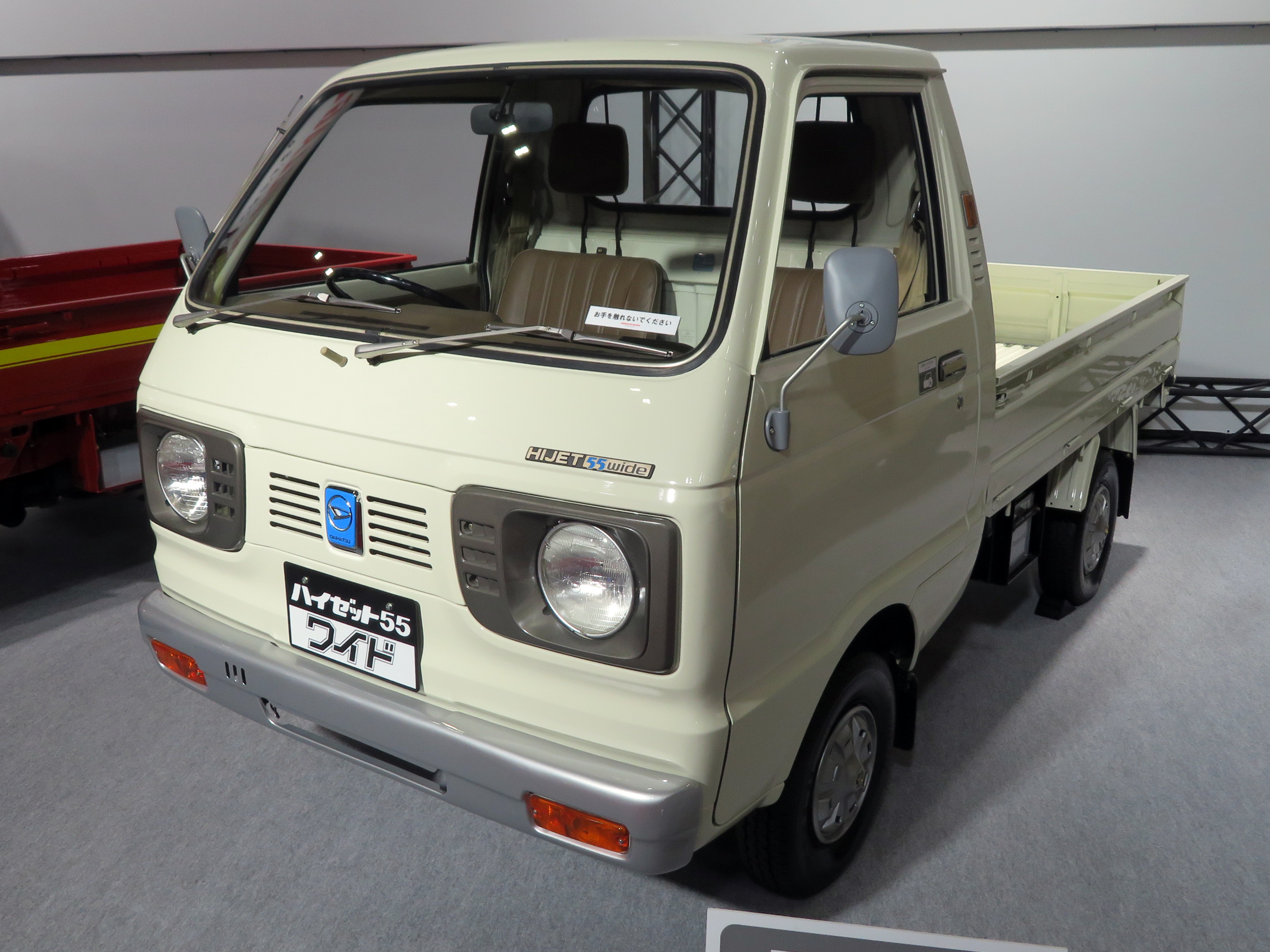
- 1977 Daihatsu Hijet 55 Wide Truck

Overview
- Also called: Daihatsu 55 Wide (export); Daihatsu City-Bus (Austria); Daihatsu Sparcar (Germany)
- Production: June 1977– April 1981

Body and chassis
- Class: kei truck (Japan); microvan (Japan)
- Body style: Van; Pickup truck
- Layout: mid-engine, rear-wheel drive
- Platform: S60

Powertrain
- Engine: Gasoline: 547 cc AB20 OHC I2
- Transmission: 4-speed manual

Dimensions
- Wheelbase: 1,780 mm (70 in)
- Length: 3,195 mm (126 in)
- Width: 1,395 mm (55 in)
- Height: 1,625 mm (64 in)

In April 1977, production of the truck version of the fifth generation began. Called the "Hijet Wide 55", to draw attention to its wider body and bigger 550 cc engine, this was the first Hijet to reach export markets in any serious numbers. The 547 cc AB20 was a four-stroke, water-cooled two-cylinder unit with a single overhead camshaft and balance axle. Power output is 28 PS (21 kW) at 5,500 rpm, while max torque is 4.0 kg⋅m (39 N⋅m; 29 lb⋅ft) at 3,500 rpm. Export versions, which had to face less stringent emissions requirements, offered 30 PS (22 kW) at the same engine speed and 4.2 kg⋅m (41 N⋅m; 30 lb⋅ft) at 4,000 rpm. The only transmission installed is a four-speed manual with a floor-mounted shifter; export versions could reach a claimed 105 km/h (65 mph) top speed.

The engine is mid-mounted just behind the front axle, and access is gained by simply lifting the front seats. Chassis code is "S60", with the succeeding letter "P" signifying a simple pickup bed with one opening flap; "T" for the three-way dropside pickup; and "V" for the vans.

Three months after the introduction of the pickups (in June 1977), a glassed van with sliding doors and also a "panel van" version were released. The panel van was simply a truck with a box mounted on the rear; this version was not exported. For export, a van version without windows or rear seats was preferred. A low floor dropside bed was added in December 1977, and a minor facelift took place in September 1978. The changes were limited to different colored bumpers and headlight surrounds, and a changed metal grille insert featuring a larger "D" logo. All versions were available in either Standard or Super DeLuxe trims, but in March 1979, a comparatively luxurious "Custom EX" version of the light van was added.

In September 1979, the Hijet Wide 55 underwent a more thorough facelift: A new front clip with a single-piece grille was the most obvious change, while inside there was a new more sculpted dash as well as more comfortable seats which received adjustable backs. The two millionth Hijet was an S60 built during 1980. Production continued until replaced by the sixth generation Hijet in 1981.

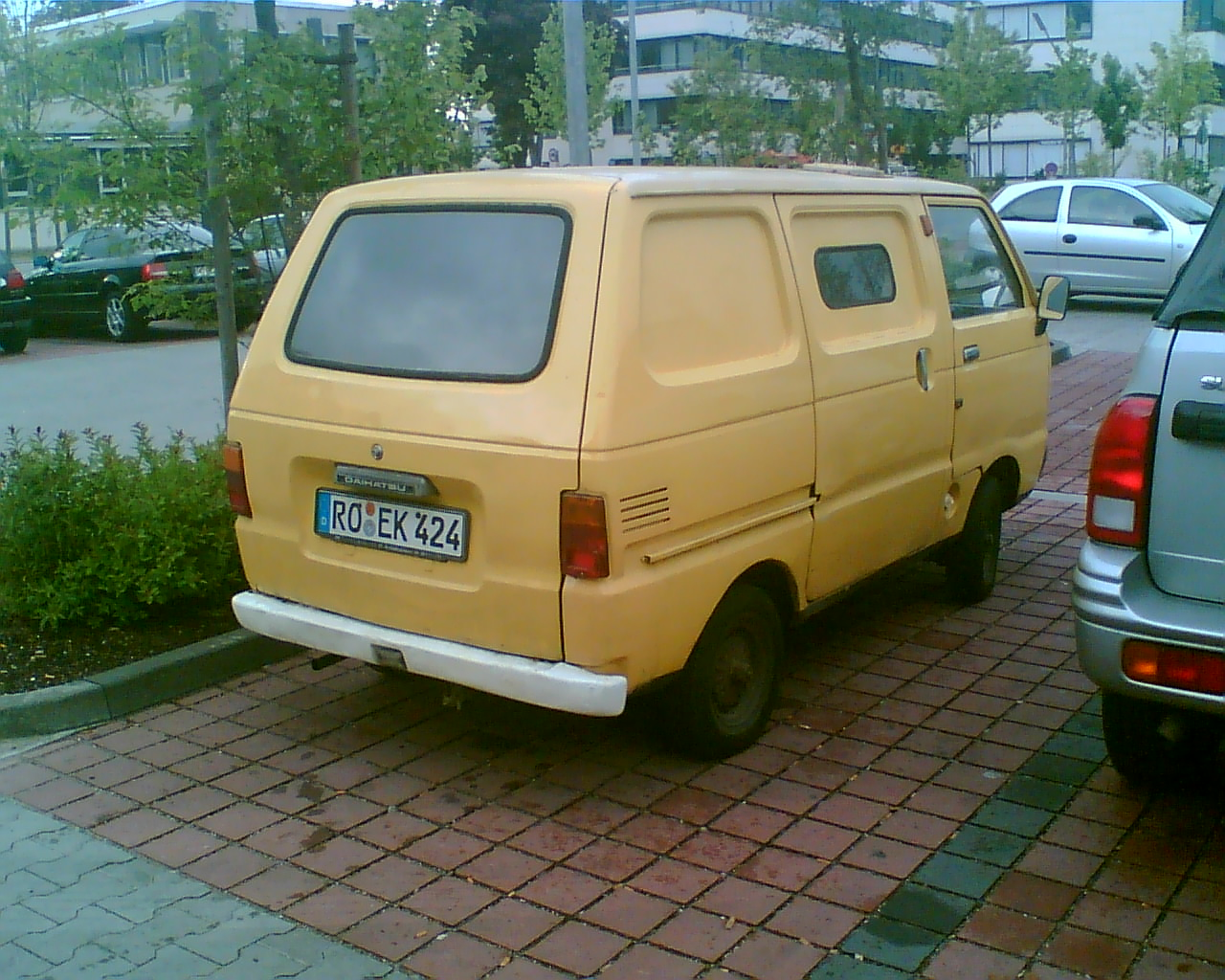
Rear view of late (export) panelled van version

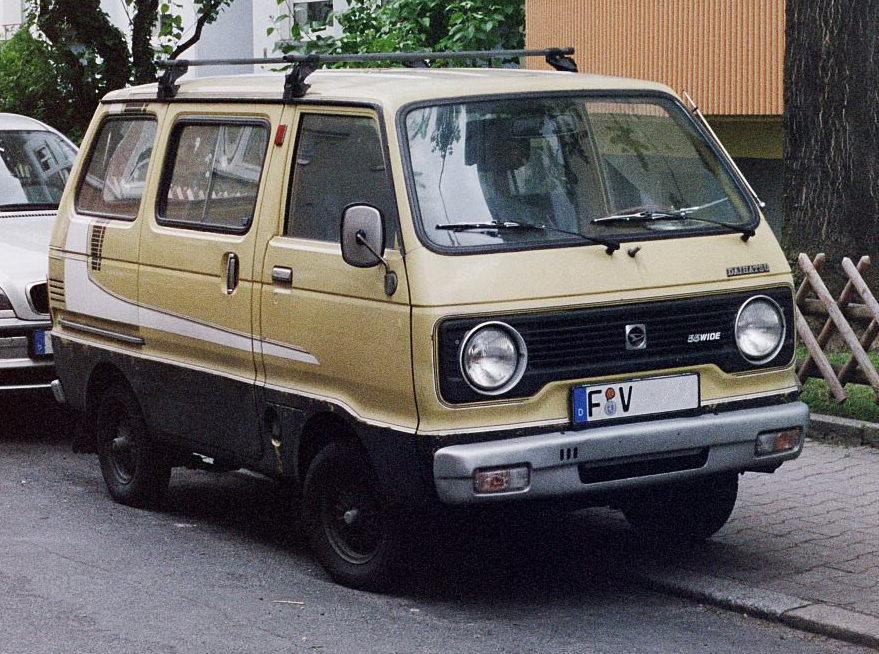
Facelifted Hijet 55 Wide (1978–1981)

== Sixth generation (S65/S66/S70/S75/S76) ==
Sixth generation (S65, S70)
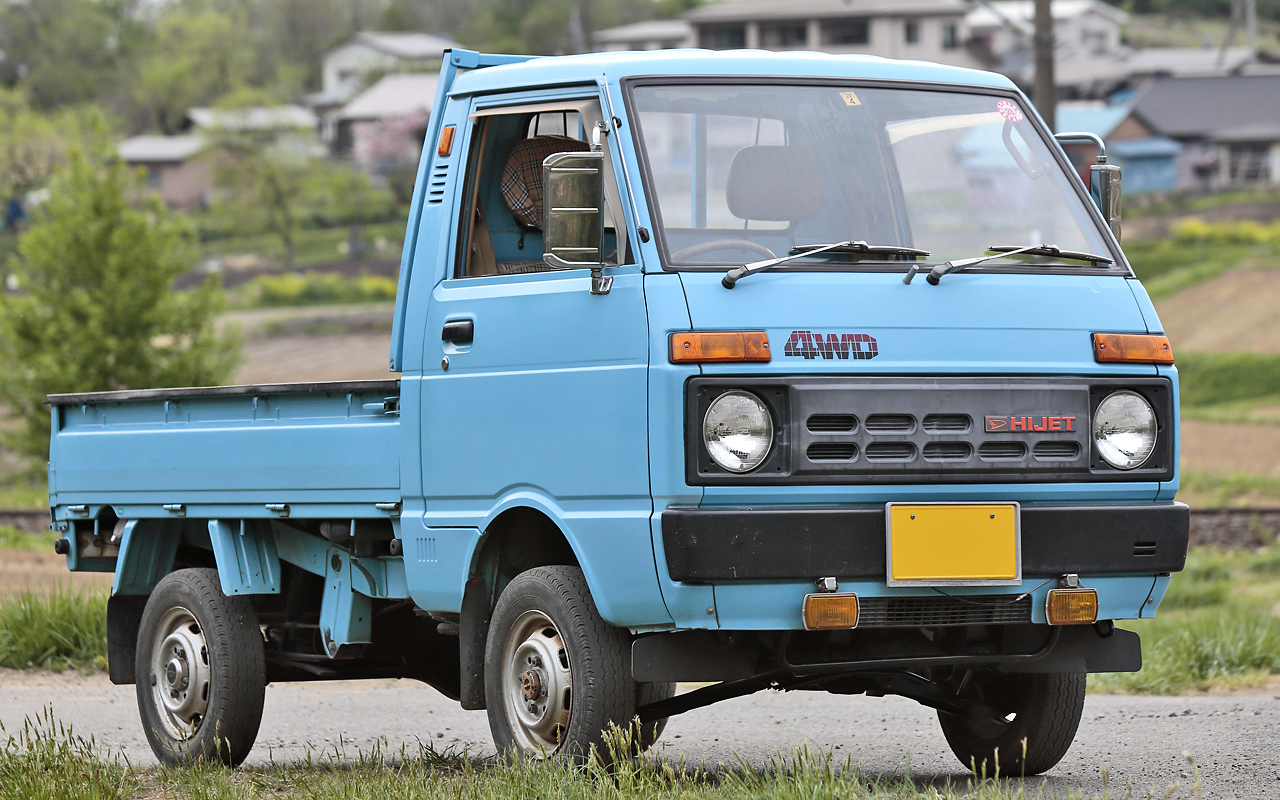
- Daihatsu Hijet 4WD (S66)

Overview
- Also called: Daihatsu 55 Wide; Daihatsu 850/1000; Daihatsu Atrai; Daihatsu Sparcar (Germany); Huali Dafa (China)
- Production: 1981–1986; 1984–2002 (China); 1982–1992 (Indonesia)

Body and chassis
- Class: kei truck (Japan); microvan (Japan)
- Body style: Van; Pickup truck
- Layout: mid-engine, rear-wheel drive; four-wheel drive
- Platform: S65/S66

Powertrain
- Engine: Gasoline: 547 cc AB20/50 I2 (S65/66); 547 cc AB55 turbo I2 (S65/66); 843 cc CD20 I3 (S70); 993 cc CB41 I3 (S75/76)
- Transmission: 4/5-speed manual

Dimensions
- Wheelbase: 1,820 mm (72 in); 1,815 mm (71 in) (4WD)
- Length: 3,195 mm (126 in); 3,375 mm (133 in)
- Width: 1,395 mm (55 in)
- Height: 1,660–1,820 mm (65–72 in)

In March 1981, the all-new S65 Hijet appeared, now on a slightly longer wheelbase but with the same AB20 engine. New was a flat-floor option for the Vans, and also new was a high-roof option. Power output is 28 PS (21 kW) at 5500 rpm, while max torque is 41 N⋅m (4.2 kg⋅m; 30 lb⋅ft) at 3500 rpm. Most mechanicals were originally the same as before, but in March 1982 the S66, a new four-wheel drive (from October 1983 with optional free-wheel front hubs and front-wheel disc brakes) appeared. In Japan, the maximum load of the Hijet was 350 kg (772 lb); export models (with the same, 547 cc engine) were rated for 565 kg (1,246 lb).

In the United Kingdom, early, 550 cc models were sold as the Daihatsu 55 Wide. From 1982, export versions generally received a torquier 843 cc three-cylinder engine (CD20), called the Daihatsu 850 Cab (S70 series). The 850 also benefitted from twelve-inch wheels rather than the ten-inch ones used on the smaller-engined models. In 1983 a one-liter version was also made available. In un-catalyzed trim, as sold in many export markets, this model produces 47 PS (35 kW) JIS at 5600 rpm. The four-wheel-drive Hijet, only with the one-liter engine, entered export markets beginning in 1985. The Hijet 1000 received the S75 model code, with four-wheel drive it was called S76.

Indonesian-built Hijets (by P.T. Astra International) had a longer body on the same wheelbase, and was available with a variety of locally developed bodywork. They were fitted with the one-liter engine subsequent to a decree by the Indonesian government that the smallest car engine built in the country by 1985 would have to be one liter. The rear portion of the body was developed locally, and the dies were also manufactured in Indonesia, thereby lowering licensing fees and minimizing imports. A variety of different minibus bodystyles were offered by a number of small bodybuilders. This Hijet was the most successful model in the fastest growing segment of the market, and represented one eighth of all local vehicle manufacture in 1983. In late 1985, the Indonesian-market Hijet received a light facelift, featuring a new silver-colored grille with five small openings on the right-hand side. This generation of the Hijet was kept in production in Indonesia until 1992.

Also in 1983, the Hijet Jumbo appeared, a high-roofed extended cab pickup with a shorter bed. This meant that there was space for more comfortable seats, with considerable more travel and folding seatbacks. The resulting rear compartment offered small luggage spaces, a flat-folding passenger seat, and a small luggage rack above. The two-wheel Jumbo was available with a fifth gear, as were some versions of the Atrai passenger van. There was also a Hijet Climber series (two- or four-wheel drive), these were fitted with bigger off-road tires and a limited-slip differential.

The S65 was also sold as the Hijet Atrai Van from September 1981, a version specifically intended for passenger use. From October 1983, this became a separate badge in the Japanese market, where the Atrai remains separate from the more workmanlike Hijets. There was also a handicap accessible version of the Hijet S65V, which could accommodate a folding wheel chair. The most surprising news was probably the addition of a turbocharged version in February 1984, also available with four-wheel drive.

A subsidiary of FAW Tianjin began producing the S65 Hijet in 1984, originally as the Tianjin TJ110 but later as the Huali Dafa. The Chinese-built trucklets were only available with two-wheel drive and the 843 cc three-cylinder CD engine, offering 41 PS (30 kW) at 5,500 rpm. The high roof was also available in China. The Huali Dafa was used as a popular taxicab and production ended in 2002.

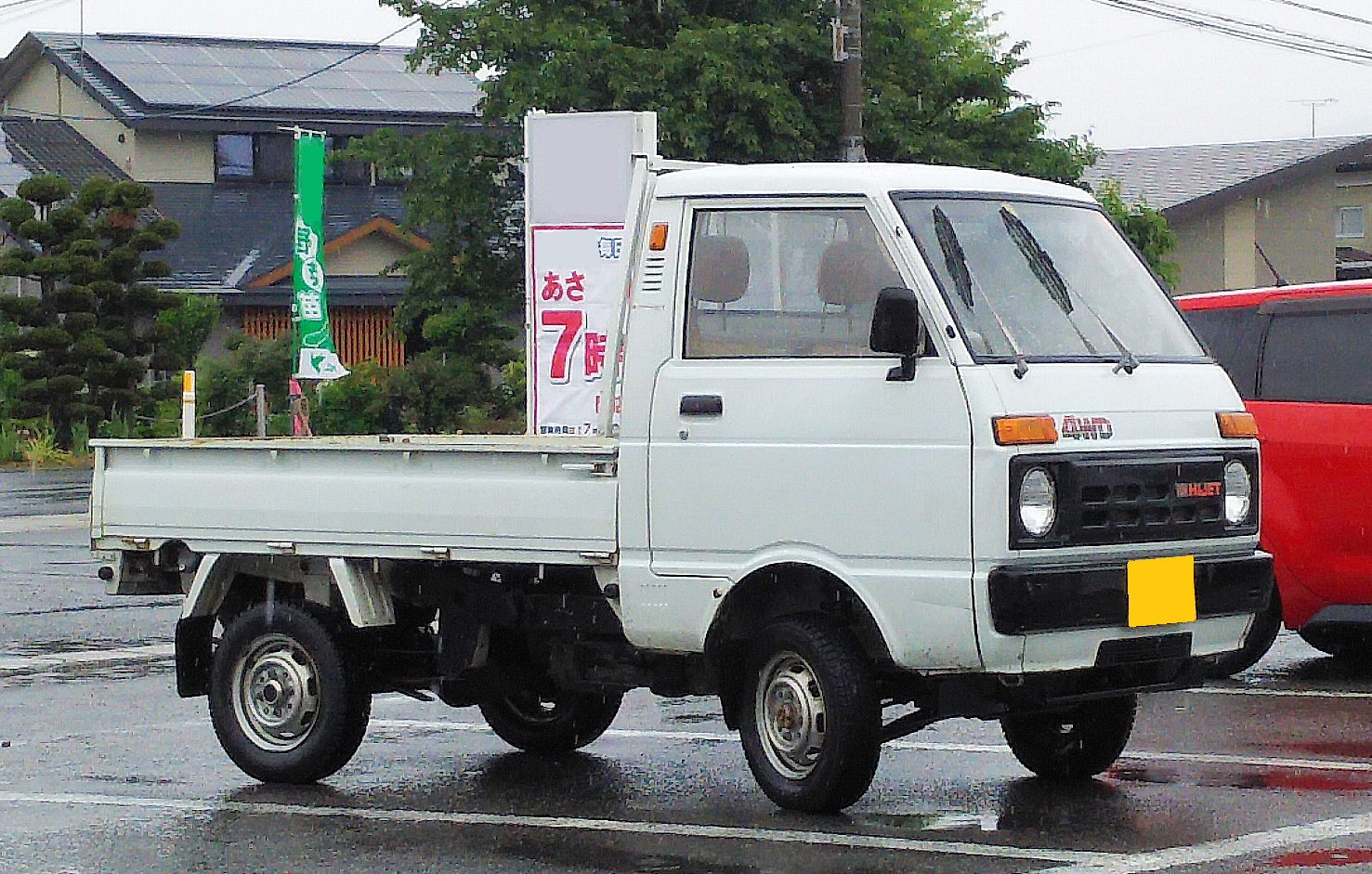
1983–1986 Daihatsu Hijet Climber 4WD (S66, Japan)

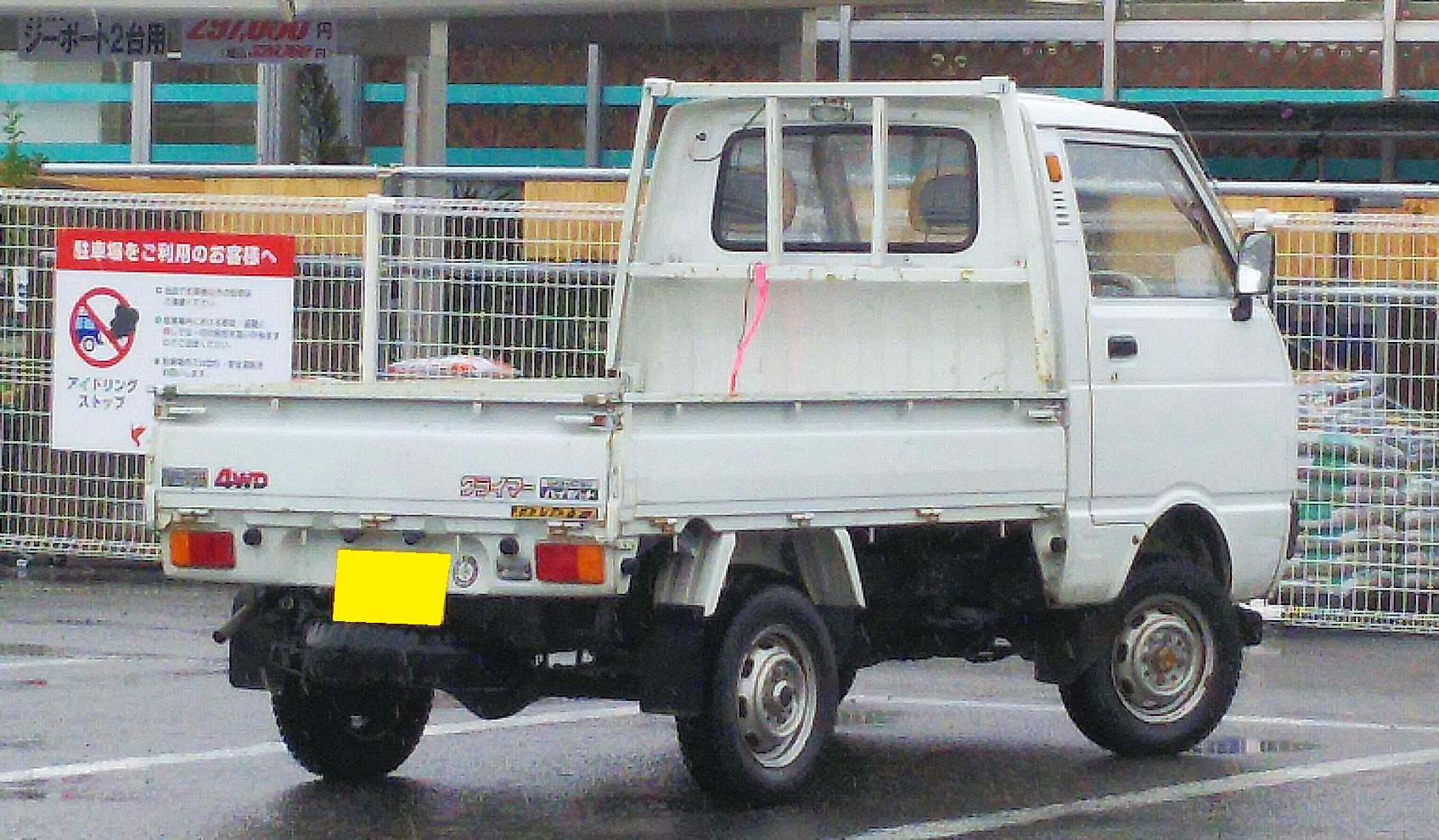
1983–1986 Daihatsu Hijet Climber 4WD (S66, Japan)

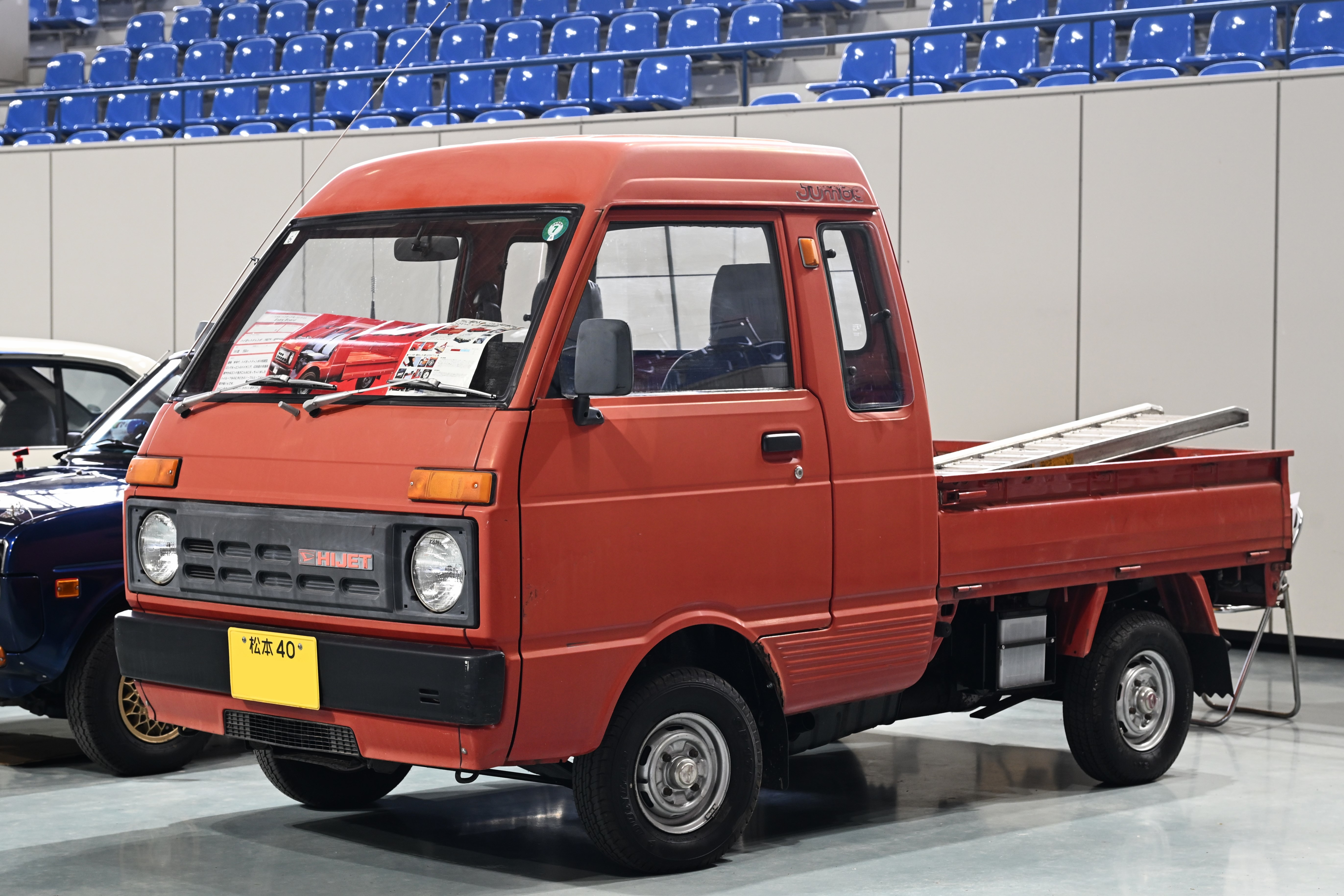
Daihatsu Hijet Jumbo

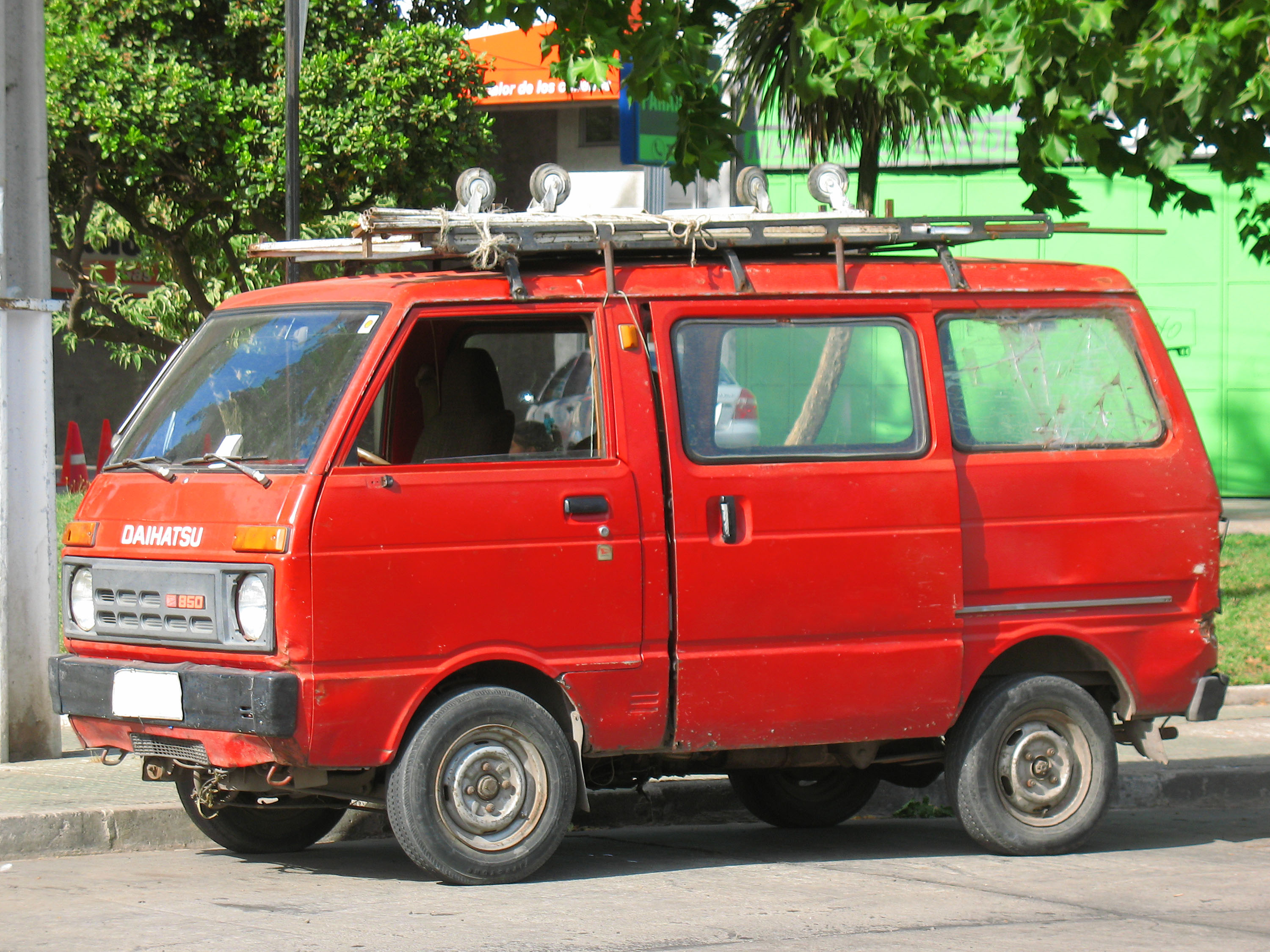
1986 Daihatsu 850 Van (S70, Chile)

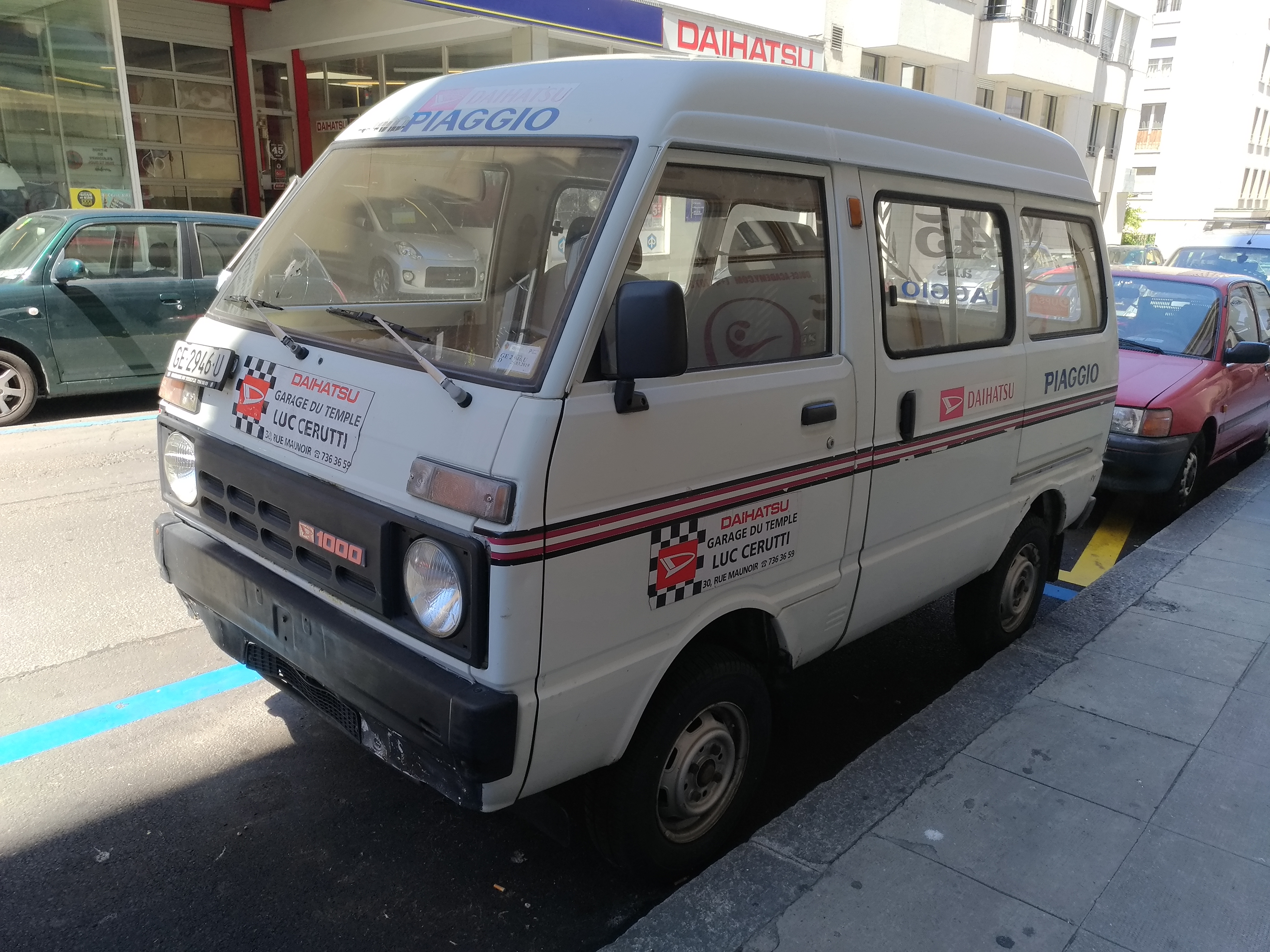
Daihatsu 1000 Van (S75, Switzerland)

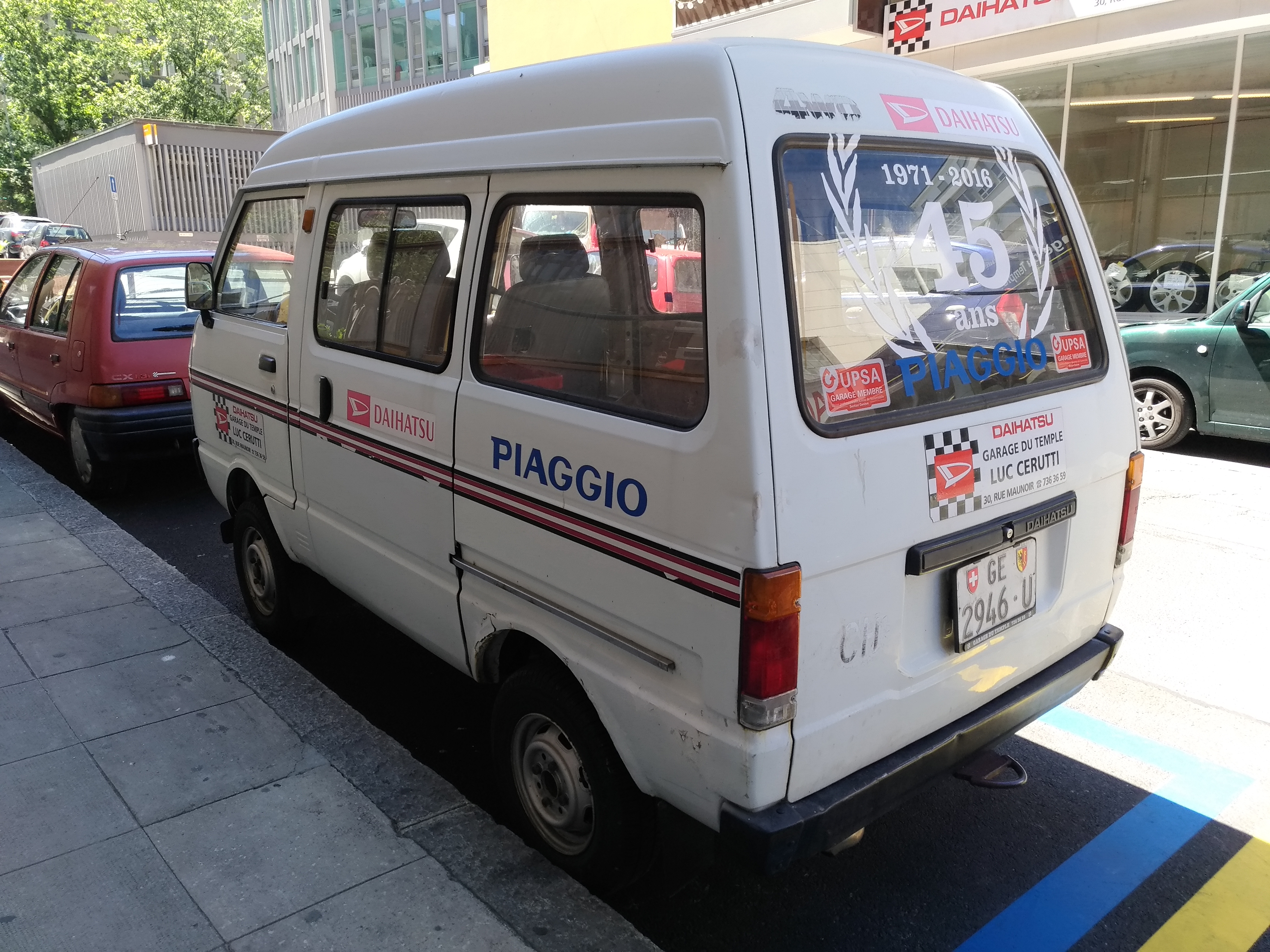
Daihatsu 1000 Van (S75, Switzerland)

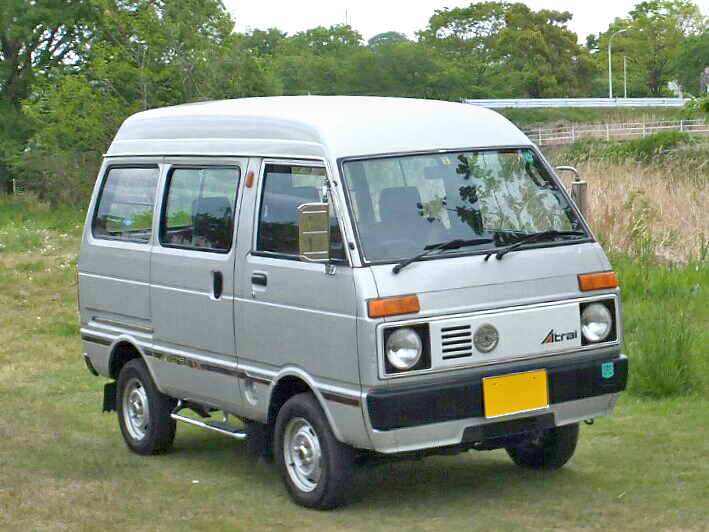
First-generation Daihatsu Atrai

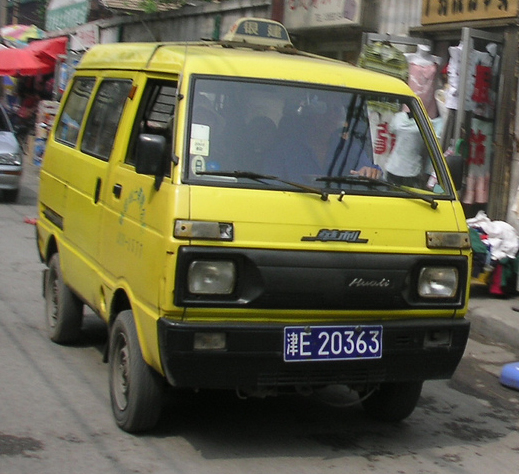
FAW Huali Dafa TJ6320 taxi

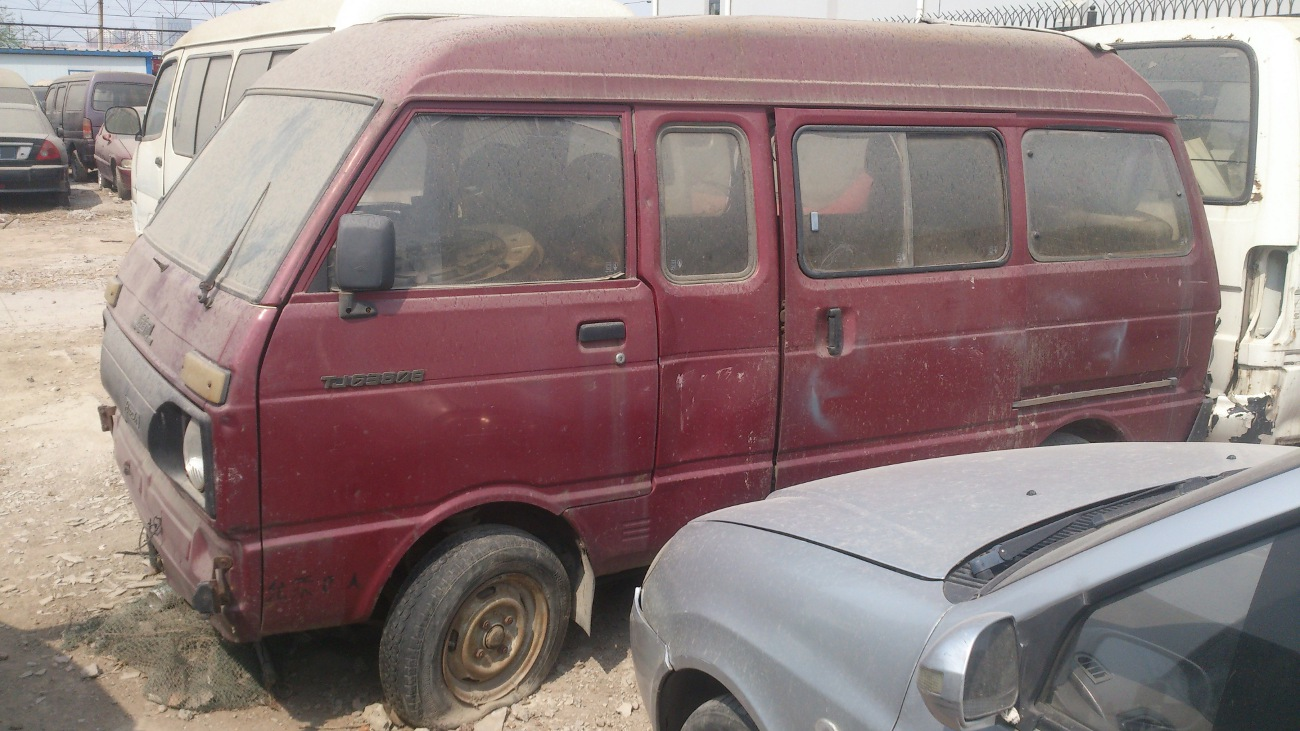
1990–2002 Tianjin Huali Dafa TJ6350B (stretched wheelbase)

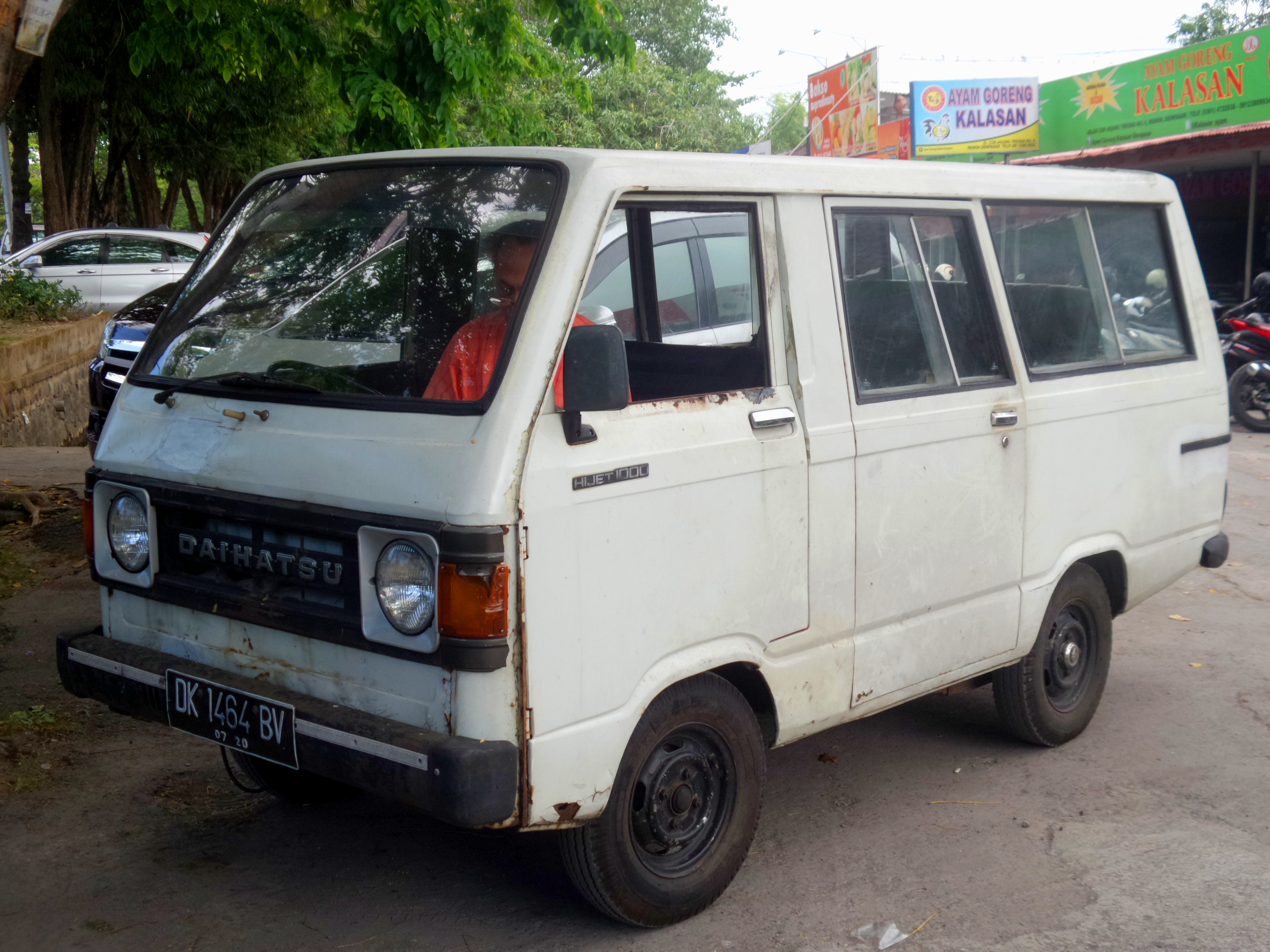
Indonesian-built Daihatsu Hijet 1000 (S75), with locally developed bodywork intended for use as an angkot

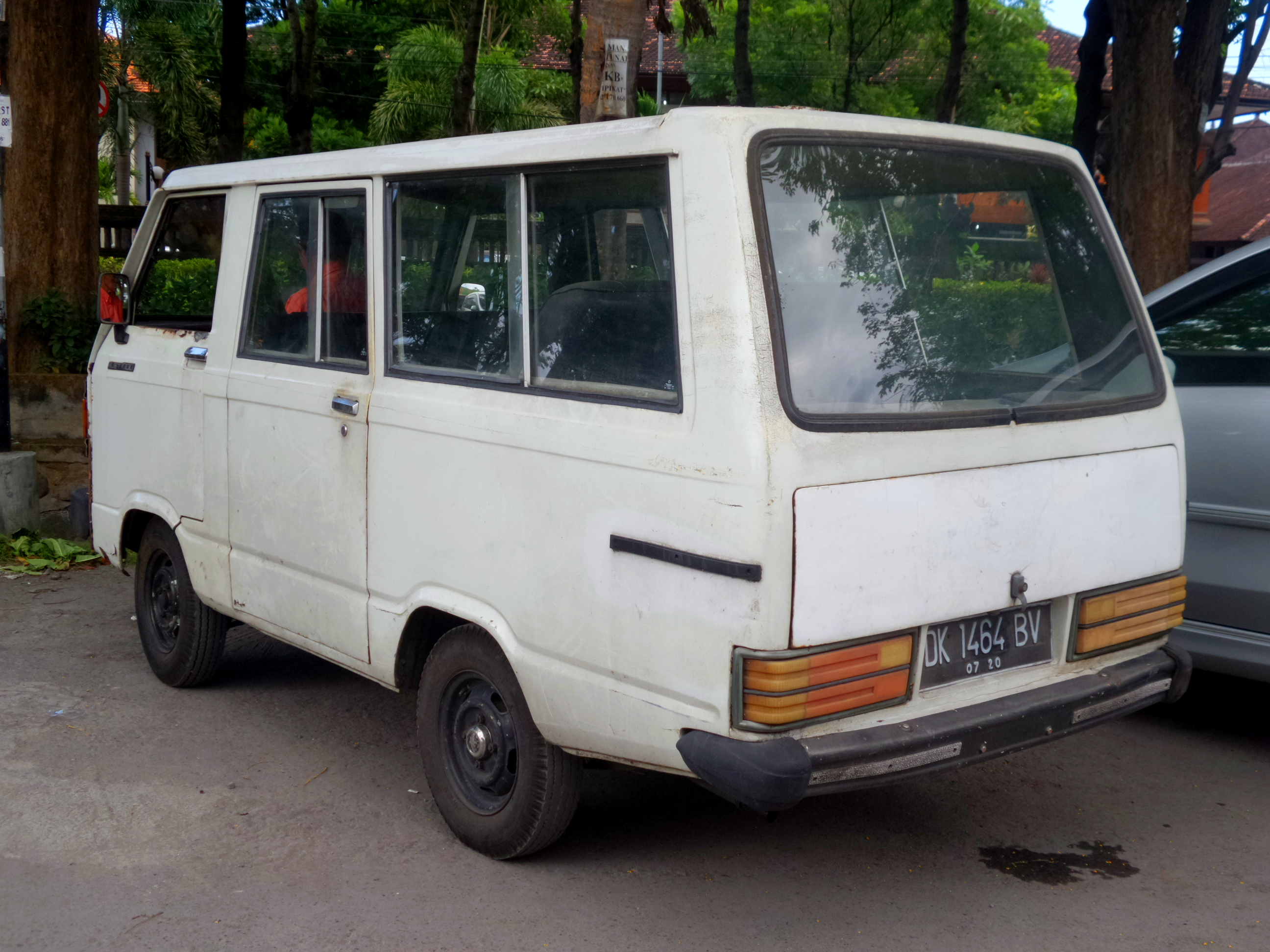
Indonesian-built Daihatsu Hijet 1000 (S75)

== Seventh generation (S80-S89) ==
Seventh generation (S80/81/82/83/85/88/89)
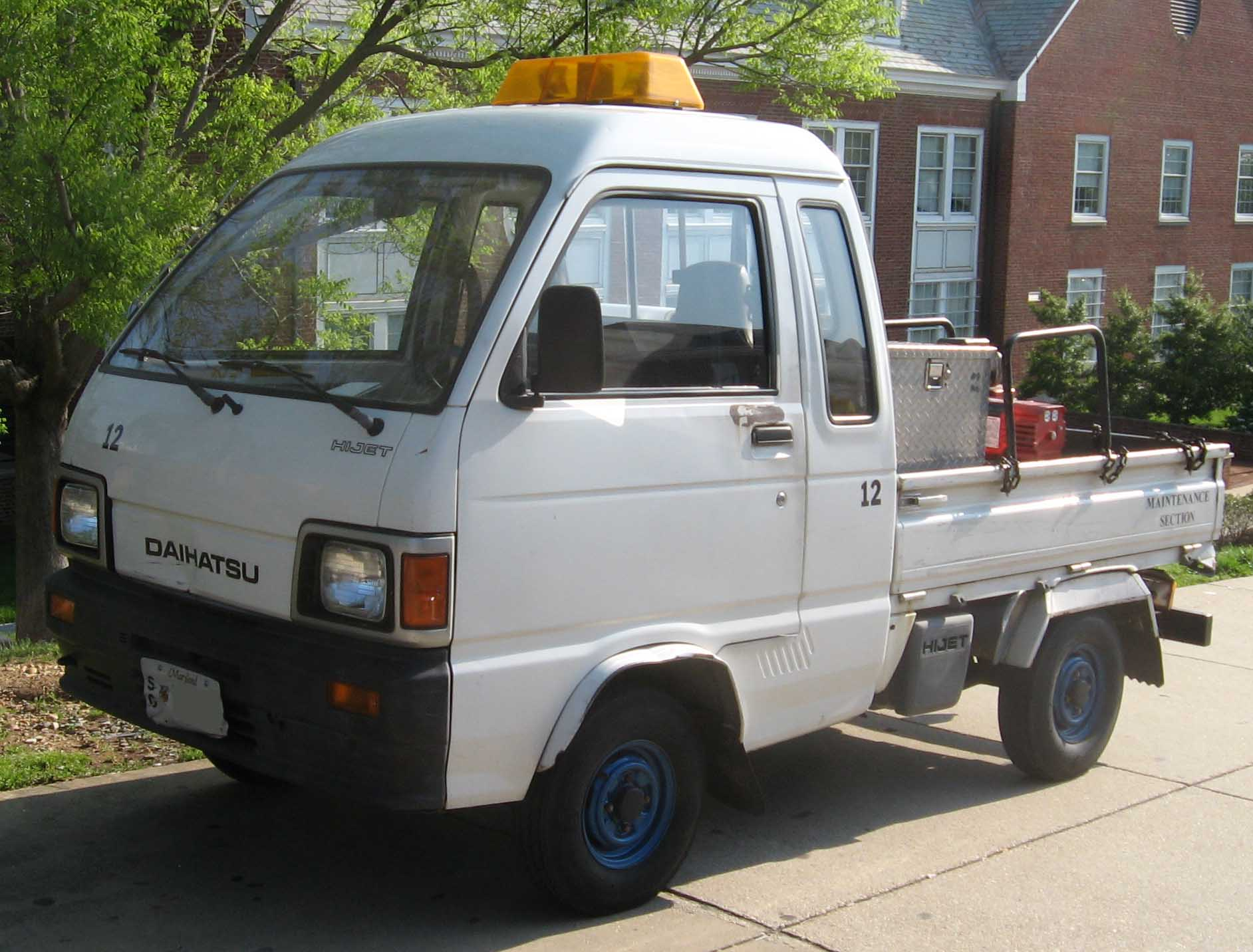
- Seventh generation Daihatsu Hijet Jumbo (S80)

Overview
- Also called: Daihatsu Atrai; Daihatsu Zebra (Indonesia); Daihatsu D130 Jumbo (truck, Indonesia); Kia Towner (South Korea); Piaggio Porter
- Production: 1986–1994 (Japan); 1986–1995 (Indonesia); 1992–2002 (South Korea)

Body and chassis
- Class: kei truck (Japan); microvan (Japan)
- Body style: 4 or 5-door Van; 2-door Pickup truck
- Layout: mid-engine, rear-wheel drive; four-wheel drive

Powertrain
- Engine: Gasoline: 547 cc EB-60 I3; 547 cc EB-70/71 turbo I3; 547 cc EB-80 s/c I3; 659 cc EF-CS/ES/VS I3; 659 cc EF-XL/XS turbo I3; 796 cc ED-10A I3; 993 cc CB-20/41/42 I3; 1295 cc HC-C I4
- Transmission: 4 or 5-speed manual 3-speed automatic

Dimensions
- Wheelbase: 1,800 mm (71 in)
- Length: 3,195 mm (126 in); 3,295 mm (130 in)
- Width: 1,395 mm (55 in)
- Height: 1,825 mm (72 in)

Chronology
- Successor: Daihatsu Zebra (S90/S91/S92) (Indonesia)

The seventh generation Hijet (S80, S81 for versions equipped with four-wheel drive) was a gradual development of its predecessor and was introduced in May 1986. The biggest change was the switch to a more modern three-cylinder engine, the EB, although displacement remained just under 550 cc. It was also built in South Korea since 1992, by Asia Motors, as the "Towner". This version was later badged "Kia Towner", subsequent to Kia's takeover. The Asia/Kia vans were only exported to certain markets (such as Malta, Chile and Brazil), according to the licensing agreement. Beginning in 1992, Piaggio also built this car in Pontedera Italy for European markets as the "Porter". This version has long outlived the original Hijet. Unlike the Hijet, the Porter has also been available with a diesel option.

This was the only generation that was sold in the United States for commercial off road use where it competed with golf carts, electric carts and three-wheeled light duty trucks.

The Japanese market Hijet continued to also be available in the "Jumbo Cab" configuration, but new was the "Deck Van" - a version of the four-door van with a very short cargo bed in the rear. This version was also sold as the Daihatsu Atrai Deck. Export market Hijets generally received Daihatsu's familiar 993 cc three-cylinder engine, while domestic versions had to make do with 550 cc due to the strict Kei rules. Following new Kei car regulations in early 1990, the Hijet was updated accordingly. As with all its brethren, it gained 10 cm (3.9 in) in overall length and 110 cc in displacement. This was enough to give it a new chassis code, S82 (S83 for four-wheel drive models). This version continued in production until being replaced by the eighth generation version in 1994.

In May 1987, a supercharged version with 44 PS (32 kW) appeared in the Hijet truck. This remained available until the introduction of the larger 660 cc engine in March 1990. The supercharger's superior torque at low engine speeds made this a natural application for a truck such as the Hijet. Conversely, the Atrai passenger car version were available with a more powerful turbo engine right from the start. In September 1992, the Hijet and Atrai received a light facelift, including alterations to both interior and exterior, as well as a number of new engines. The van and pick-up, in addition to a new fuel-injected four-valve option, also received strengthened beds and covers.

An enlarged version of this generation was built in Indonesia as the "Daihatsu Zebra", beginning in 1986, equipped with 1.0-liter 3-cylinder from previous generation. In 1989, this received a 1.3-liter 16-valve HC engine rather than the earlier one-liter unit, and sales doubled year-on-year. The 1298 cc unit produces 72 PS (53 kW) and was coupled to a four-speed manual transmission. The pickup truck version started using the "D130 Jumbo" badge.

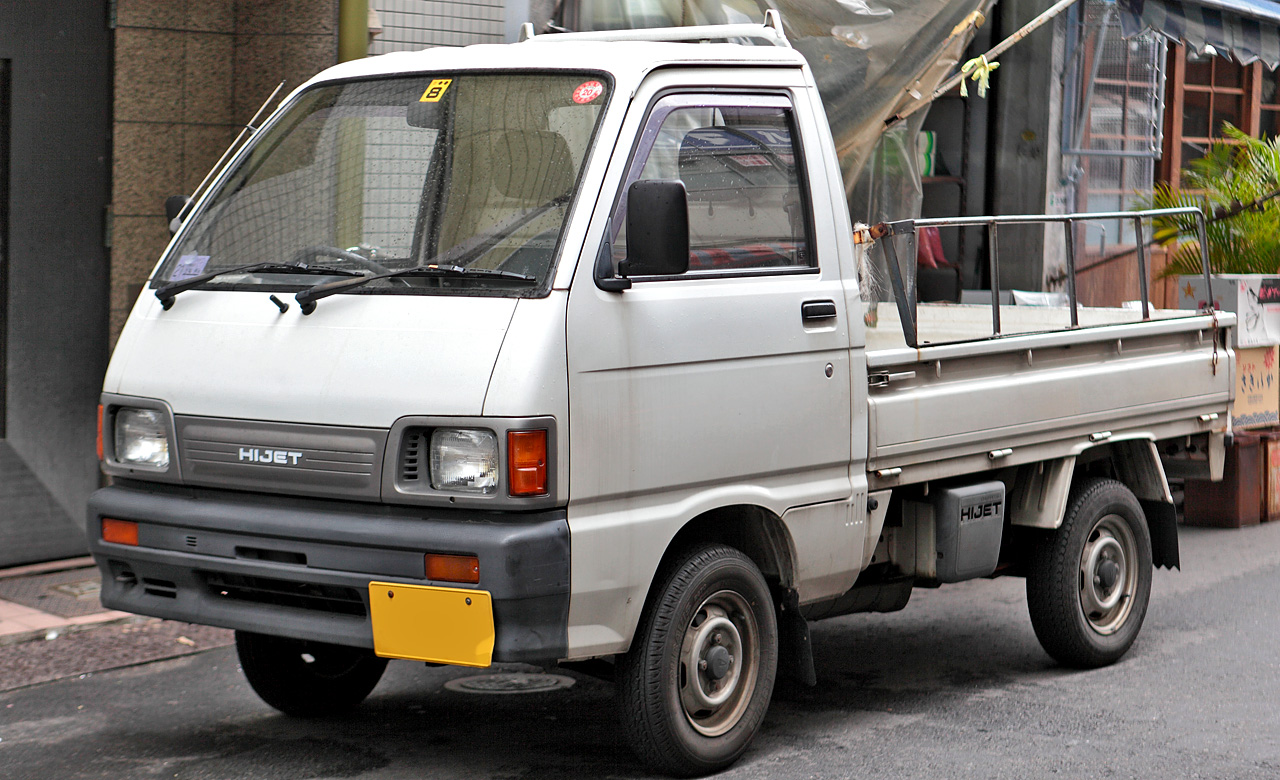
Hijet truck (Japan)

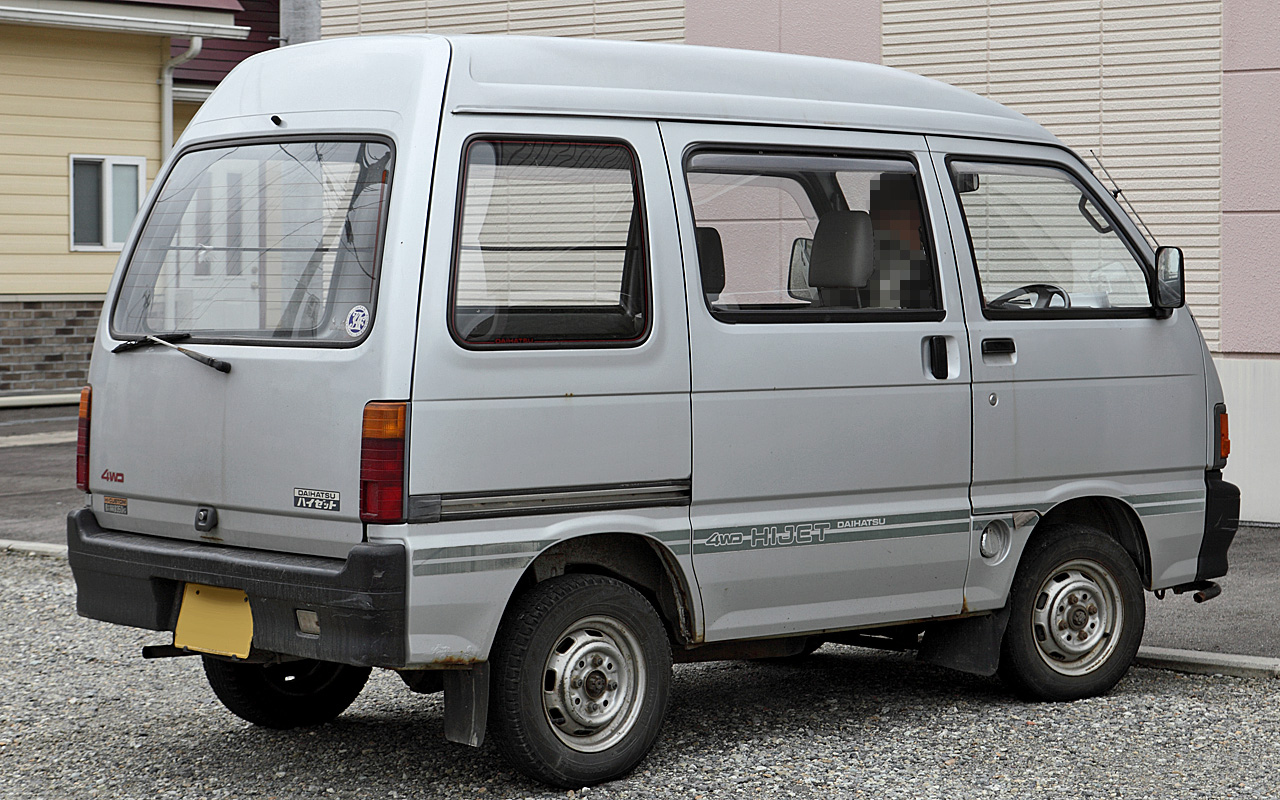
Hijet light van, rear view (Japan)

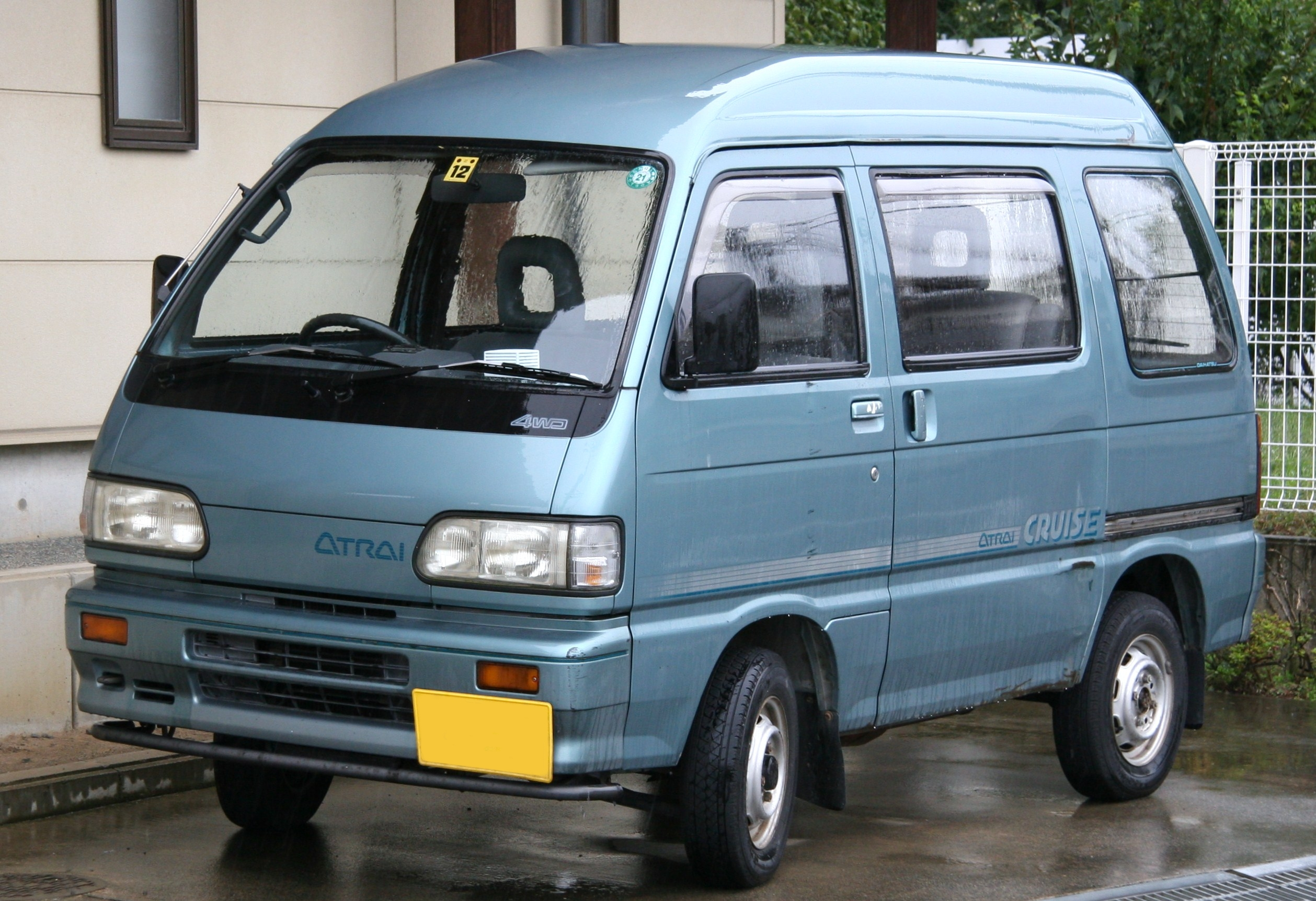
Daihatsu Atrai Cruise 4WD passenger version (Japan)

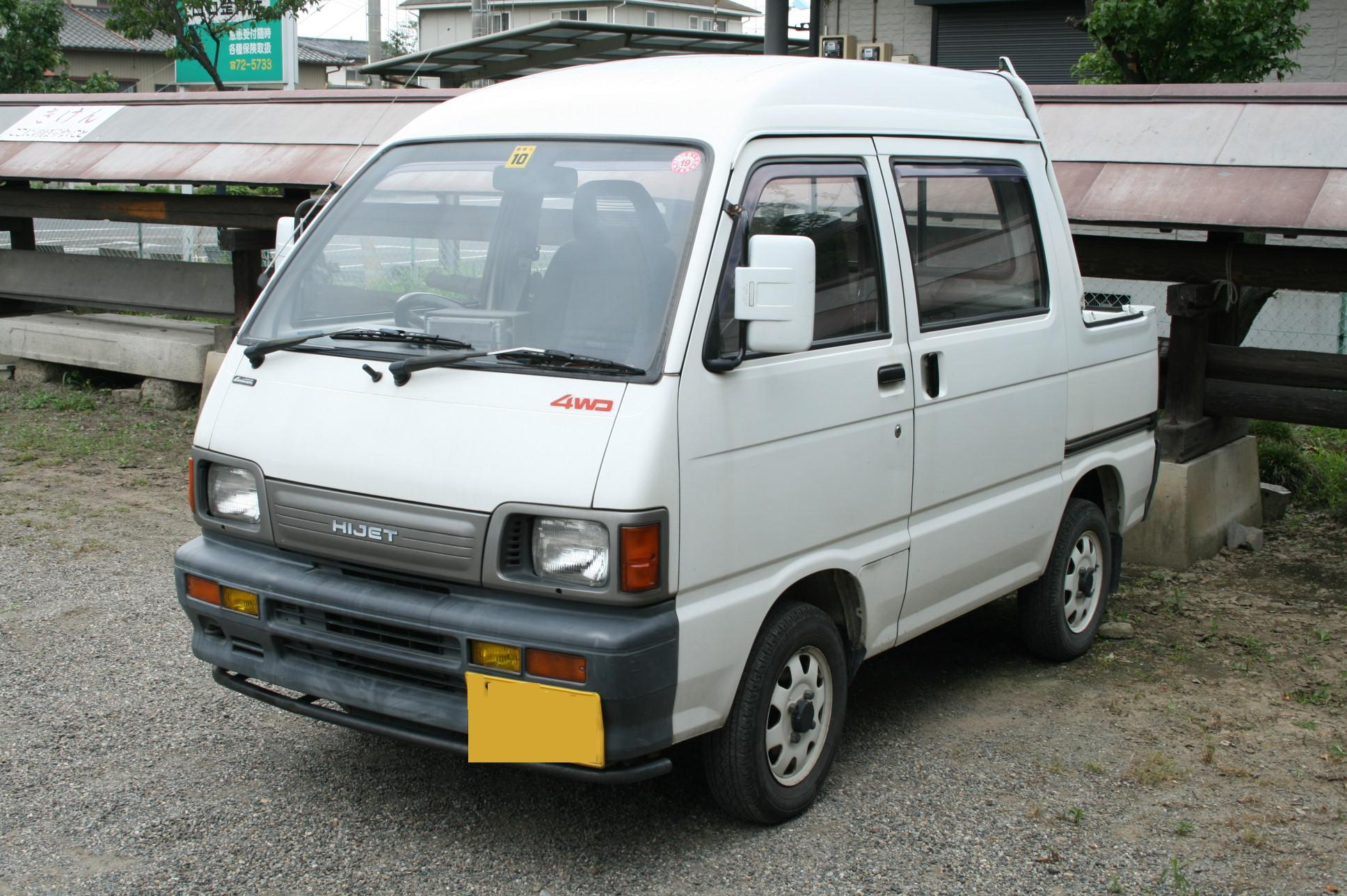
The Hijet Deck Van is a pickup version of the van

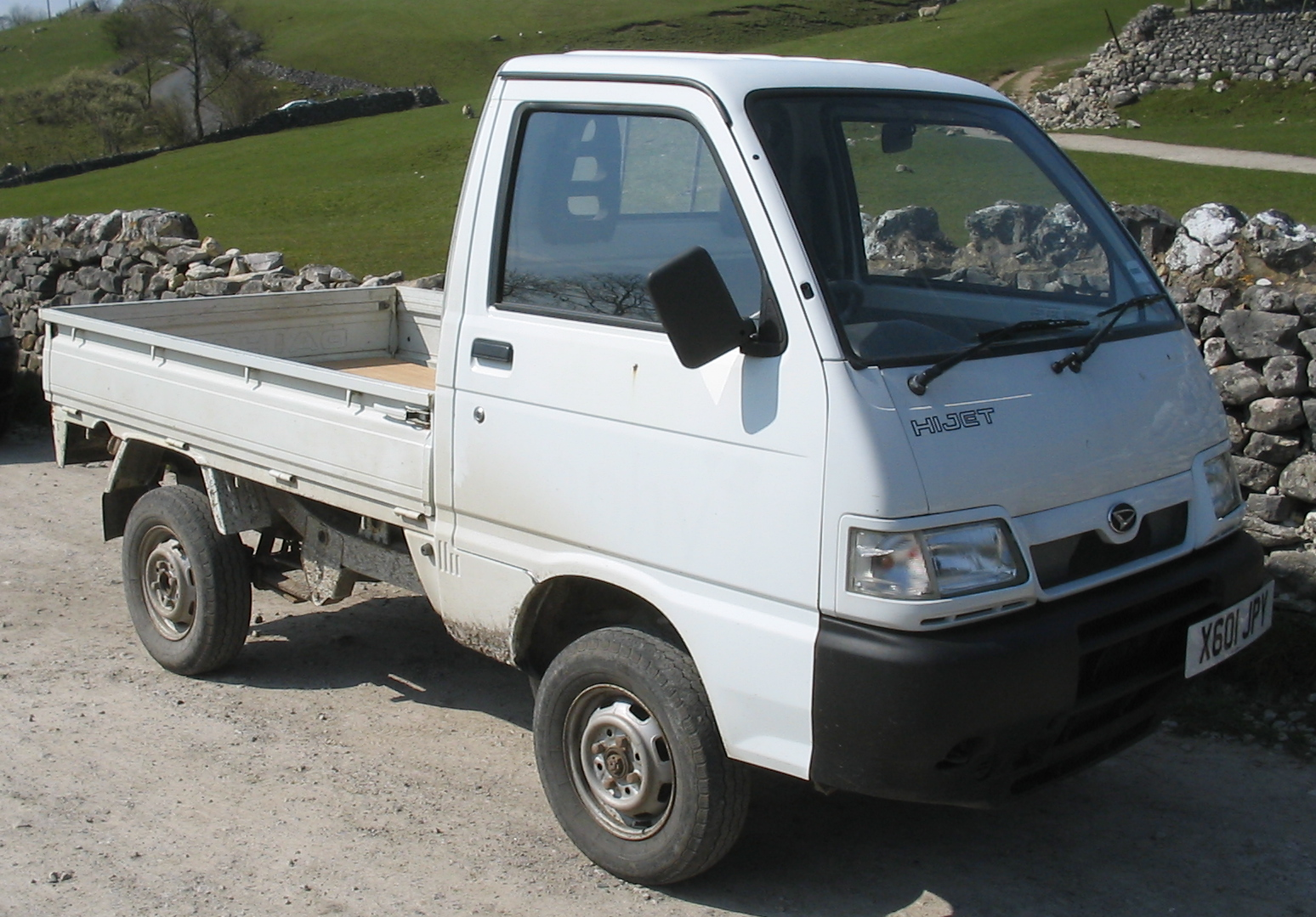
2001 Piaggio-built Daihatsu Hijet pickup (UK)

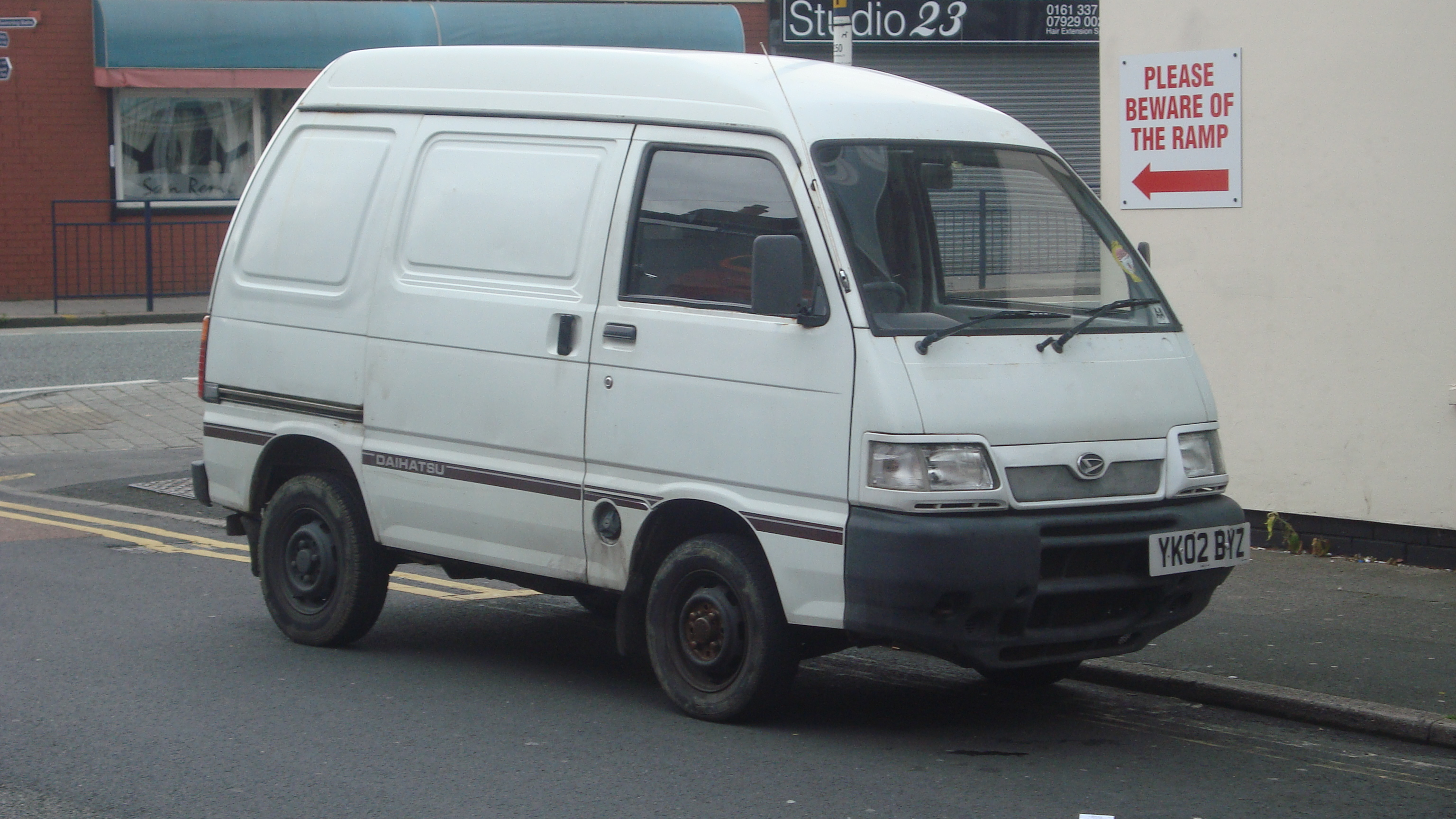
2002 Piaggio-built Daihatsu Hijet van (UK)

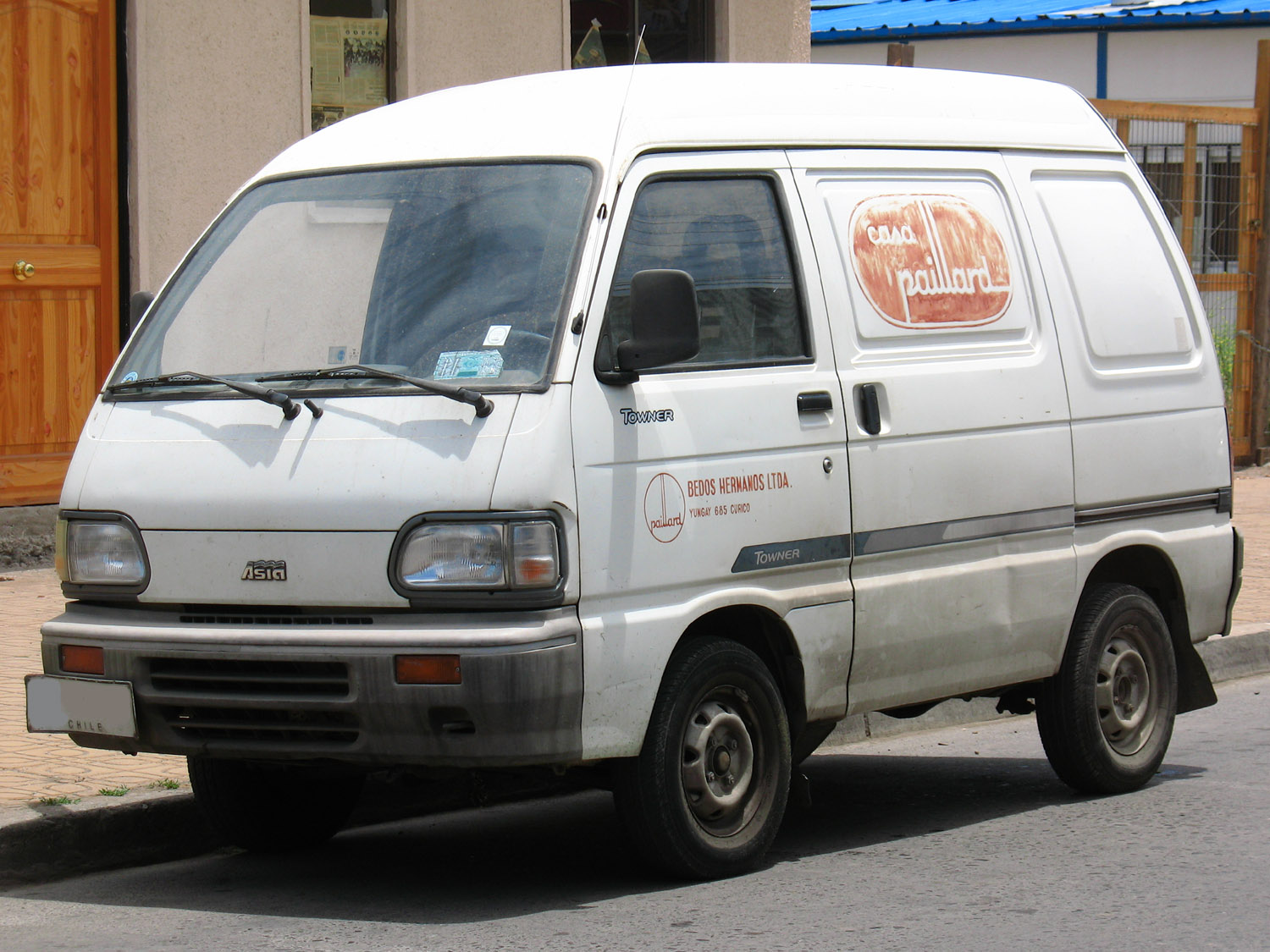
1994 Asia Towner 800 Cargo

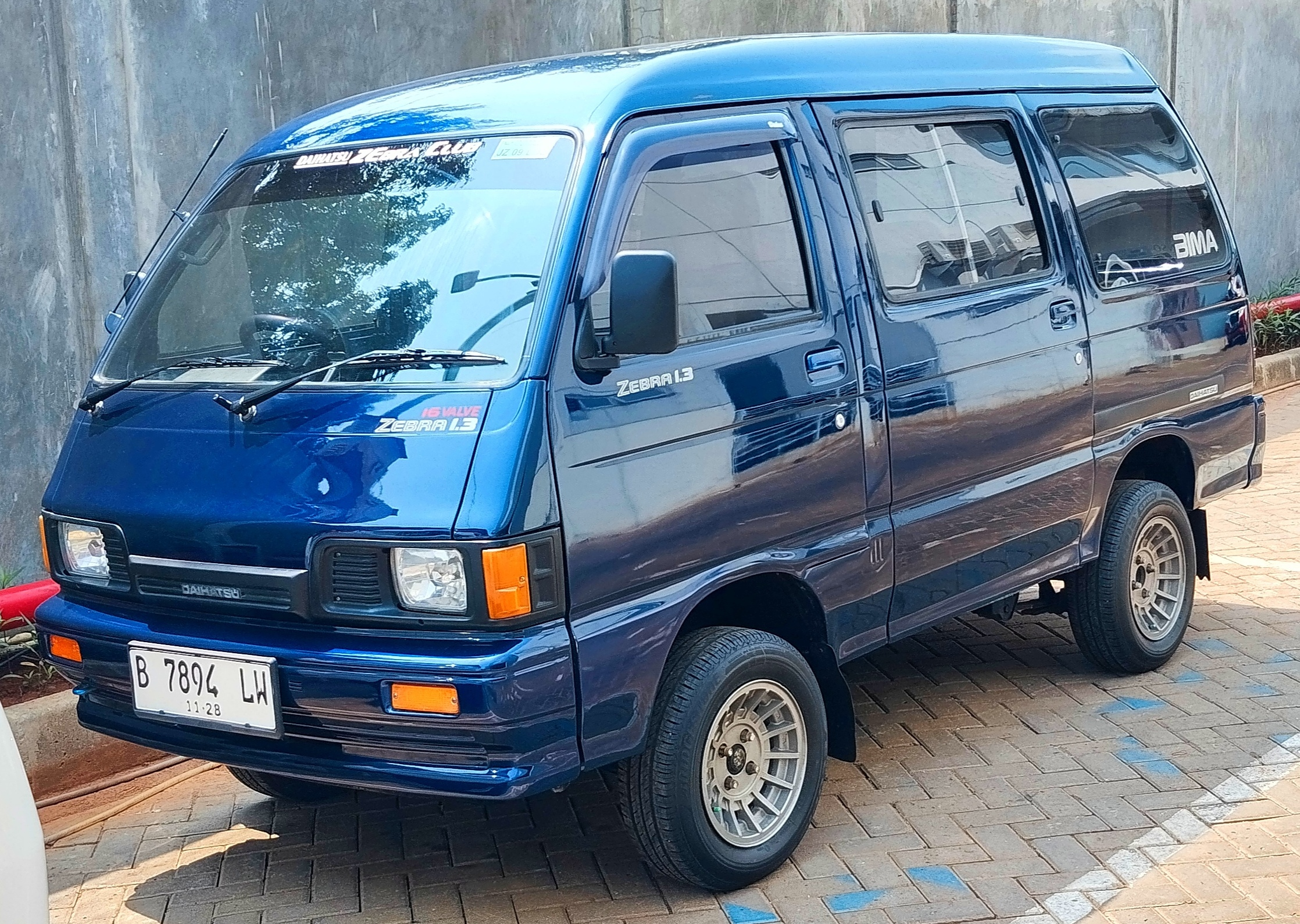
Daihatsu Zebra 1.3 Astrea (first facelift, Indonesia)

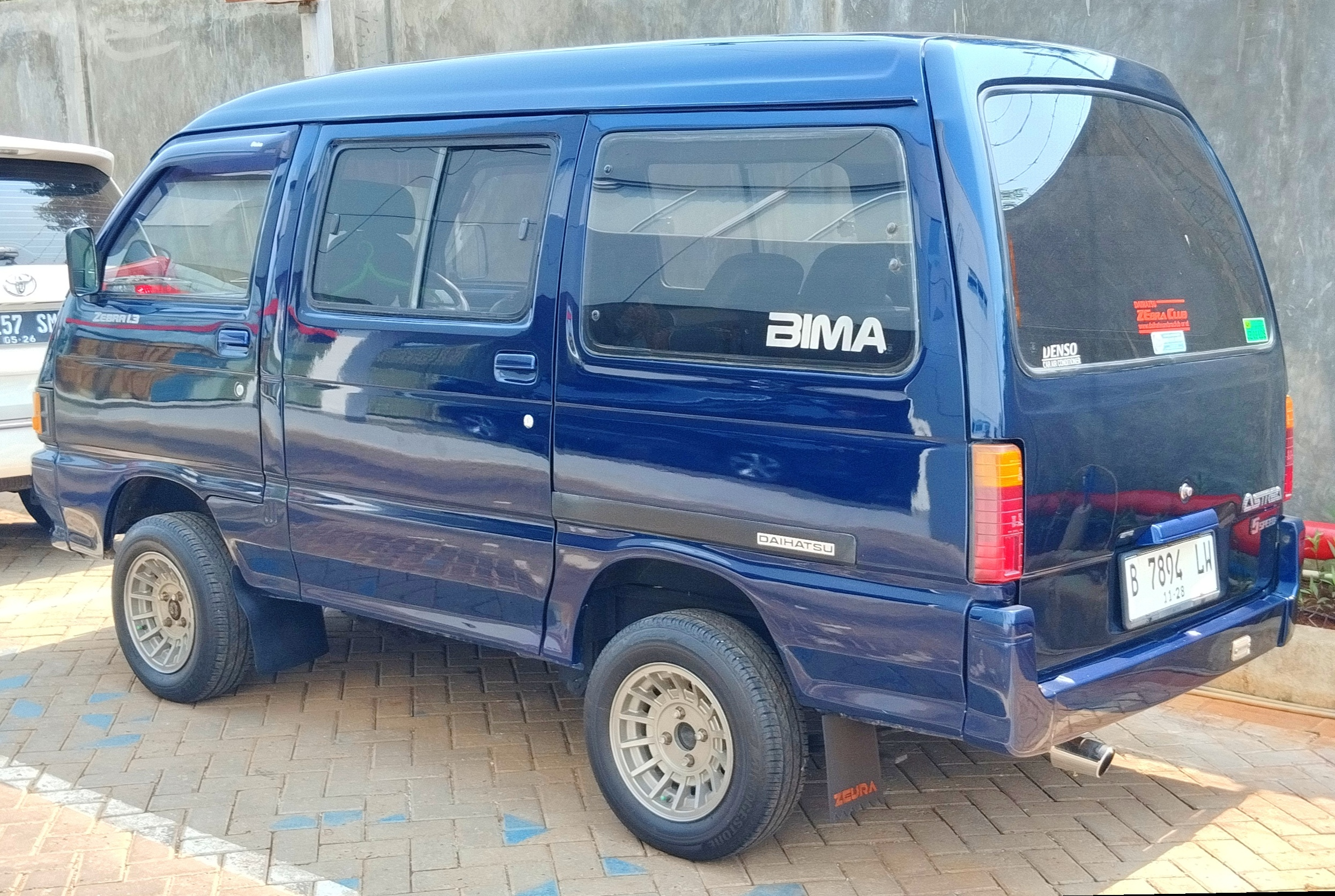
Daihatsu Zebra 1.3 Astrea rear view (first facelift, Indonesia)

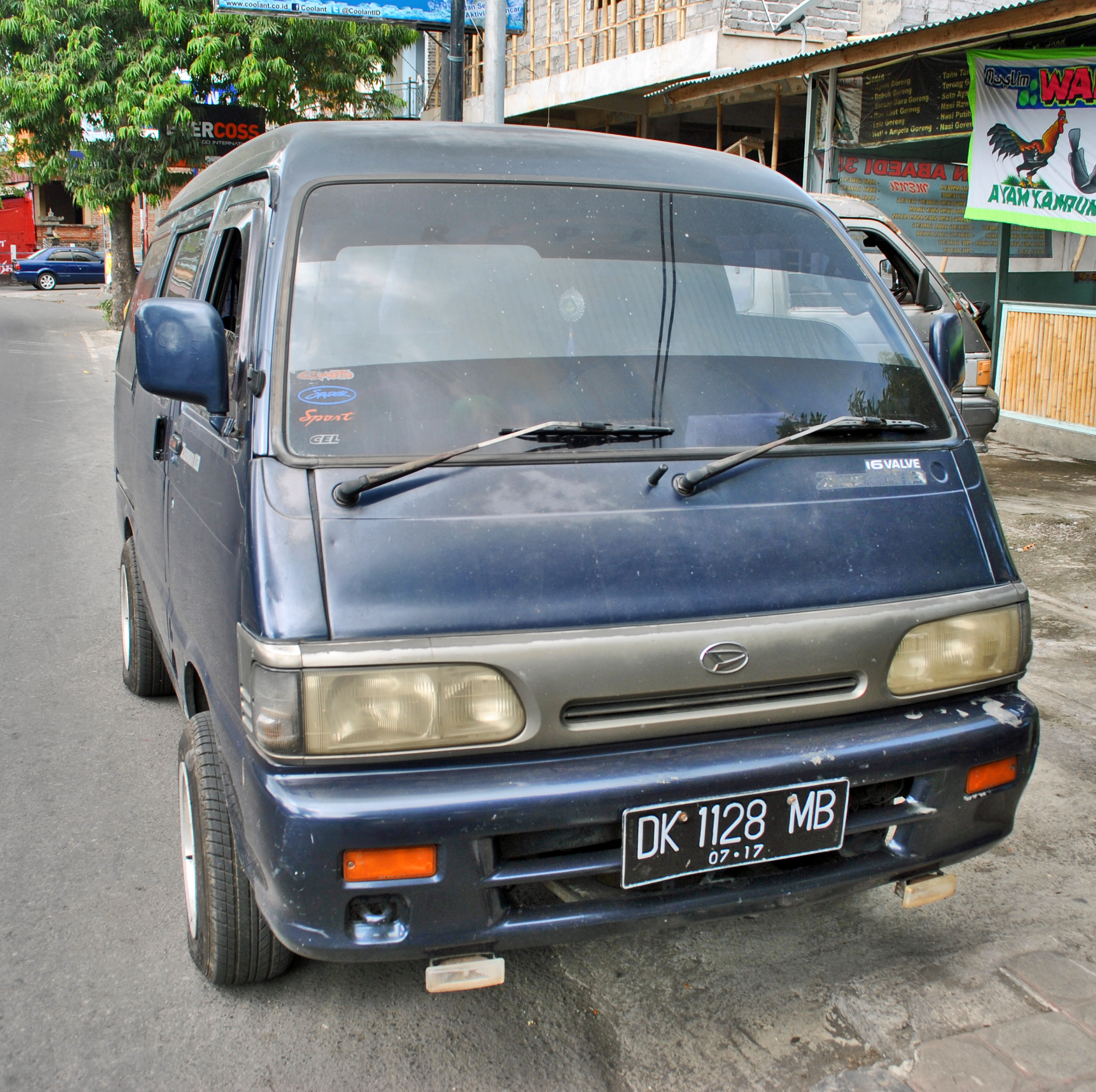
Daihatsu Zebra 1.3 Astrea (second facelift, Indonesia)

== Eighth generation (S100, S110, S120, S130) ==
Eighth generation (S100, S110, S120, S130)
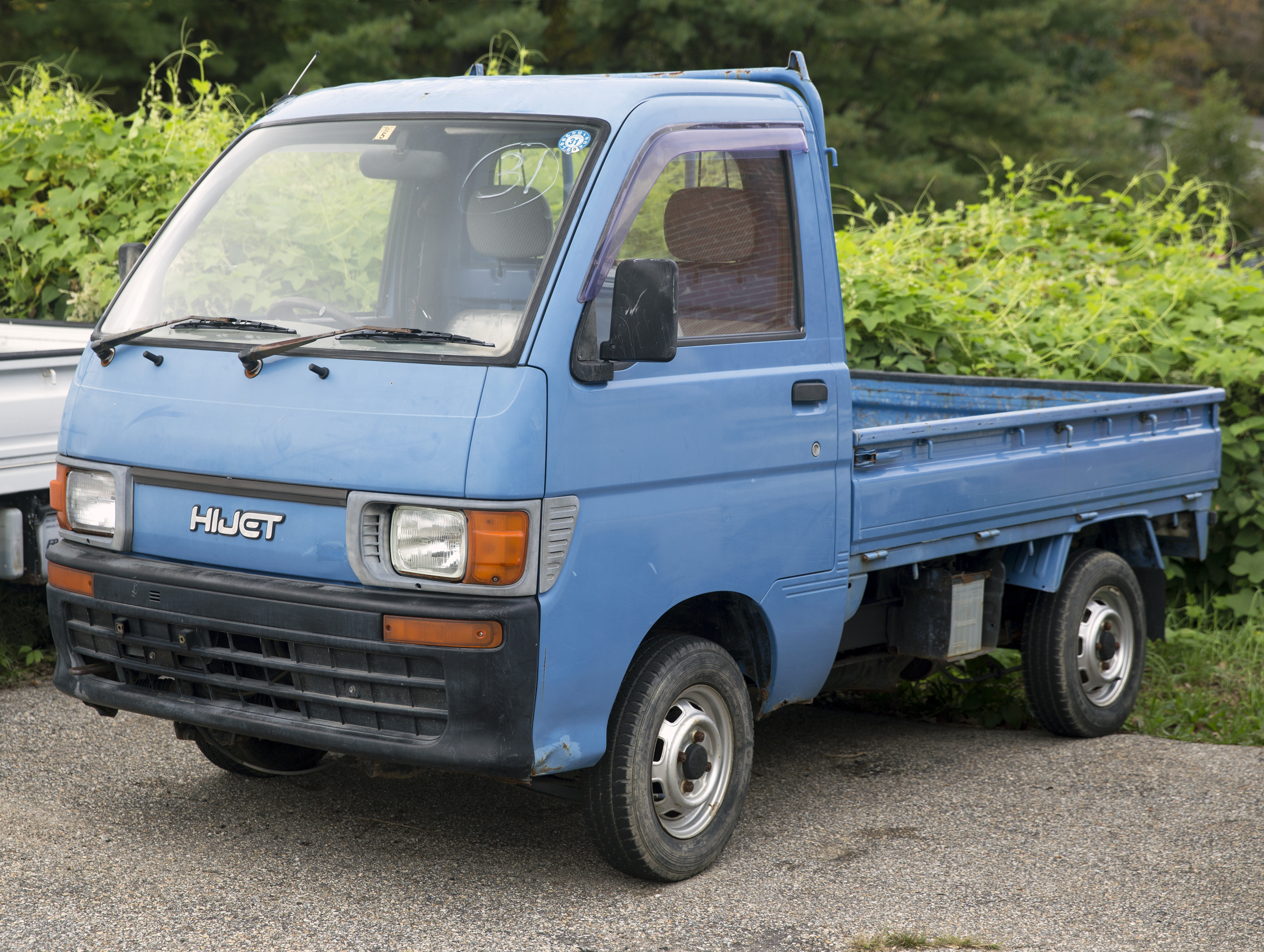
- 1994 Daihatsu Hijet Climber Truck (S110P, Japan)

Overview
- Also called: Daihatsu Atrai (van)
- Production: January 1994 – January 1999

Body and chassis
- Class: kei truck; microvan
- Body style: 2/4-door kei truck; 5-door kei van
- Layout: Front mid-engine, rear-wheel-drive or all-wheel drive

Powertrain
- Engine: Gasoline: 659 cc EF-ES/NS I3 6-valve SOHC; 659 cc EF-TS I3 6-valve SOHC (turbocharger); 659 cc EF-GS/VE/ZS I3 12-valve DOHC; 659 cc EF-RS I3 12-valve DOHC (turbocharger)
- Transmission: 5-speed manual 3-speed automatic

Dimensions
- Wheelbase: 1,900 mm (74.8 in)
- Length: 3,295 mm (129.7 in)
- Width: 1,395 mm (54.9 in)
- Height: 1,900 mm (74.8 in)

The eighth generation Hijet entered the marketplace in January 1994, after having first been shown at the 30th Tokyo Motor Show in October 1993, and continued to be built until replaced by the ninth generation in 1999. "S100" was used for two-wheel drive versions, while four-wheel-drives were coded "S110". The suffix "P" was for trucks, "C" for panel vans, and "V" for glazed vans. The passenger-oriented Atrai received "S120" and "S130" chassis codes. In May the "Hijet EV", a fully electric version of the van, appeared - replacing the EV version of the seventh generation Hijet. A fuel injected, SOHC 6-valve engine with 44 PS (32 kW) (EF-ES) was standard on automatic cars and optional on five-speed manuals, which otherwise received a carburetted version with two horsepower less. From January 1996, automatics received a twin-cam 12-valve carburetted version of the EF engine (EF-GS), still with the same power.

In 1995, a Hijet EV Truck appeared, complementing the Van version. Appearing in October 1997, the "Hijet IS" was a youthful version with sporty design traits, including a blacked out front panel and various body cladding items. "IS" stood for "Idol" and "Stylish".

The new Atrai was focused more on passenger comfort than earlier generations, and has a three-link independent rear suspension rather than the leaf sprung, live axle of the Hijet. This is why the Atrai has its own chassis numbers (S120/130). The Atrai passenger van was available with more powerful turbocharged engines, such as the SOHC 6-valve EF-TS and the twin-cam, 12-valve EF-RS (from January 1997). Both of these engines nominally remained beneath the 64 PS (47 kW) limit set by Japanese regulators for Kei cars—but with 13.6 percent more torque than the lower tuned single-cam turbo engine, it was clear to all that the EF-RS had considerably more power than acknowledged. The Turbo SR (and later RT) models received anti-lock brakes as standard. In October 1997, the Atrai Classic appeared; this model has a leather interior and keyless entry, among other equipment improvements.

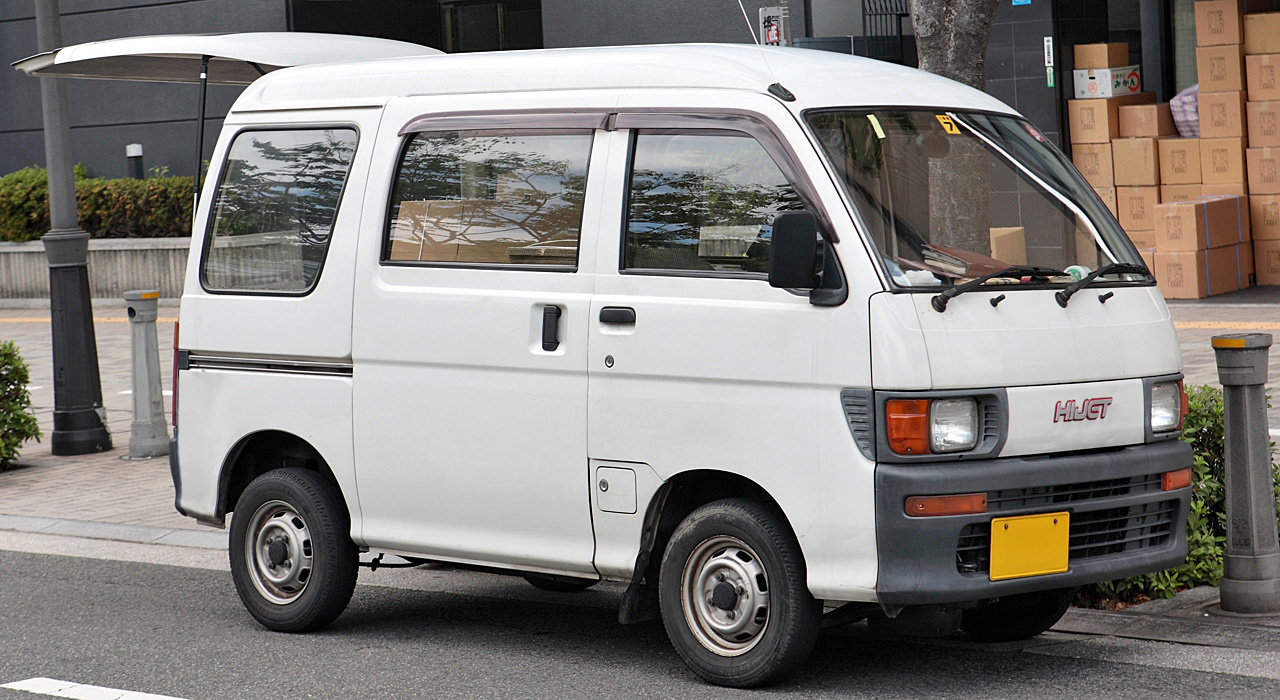
The eighth generation Hijet Cargo

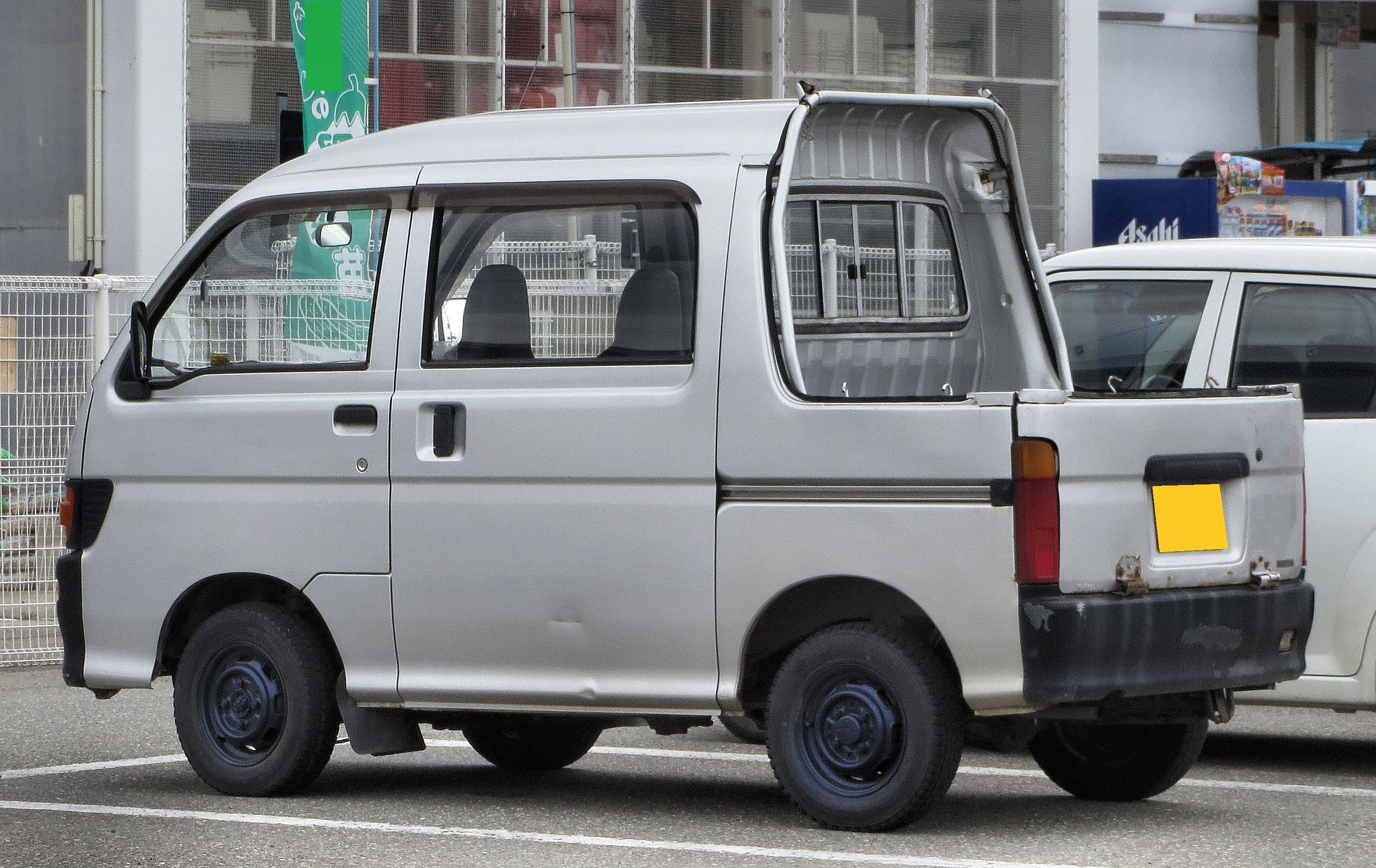
Hijet Double Deck AWD (S110W)

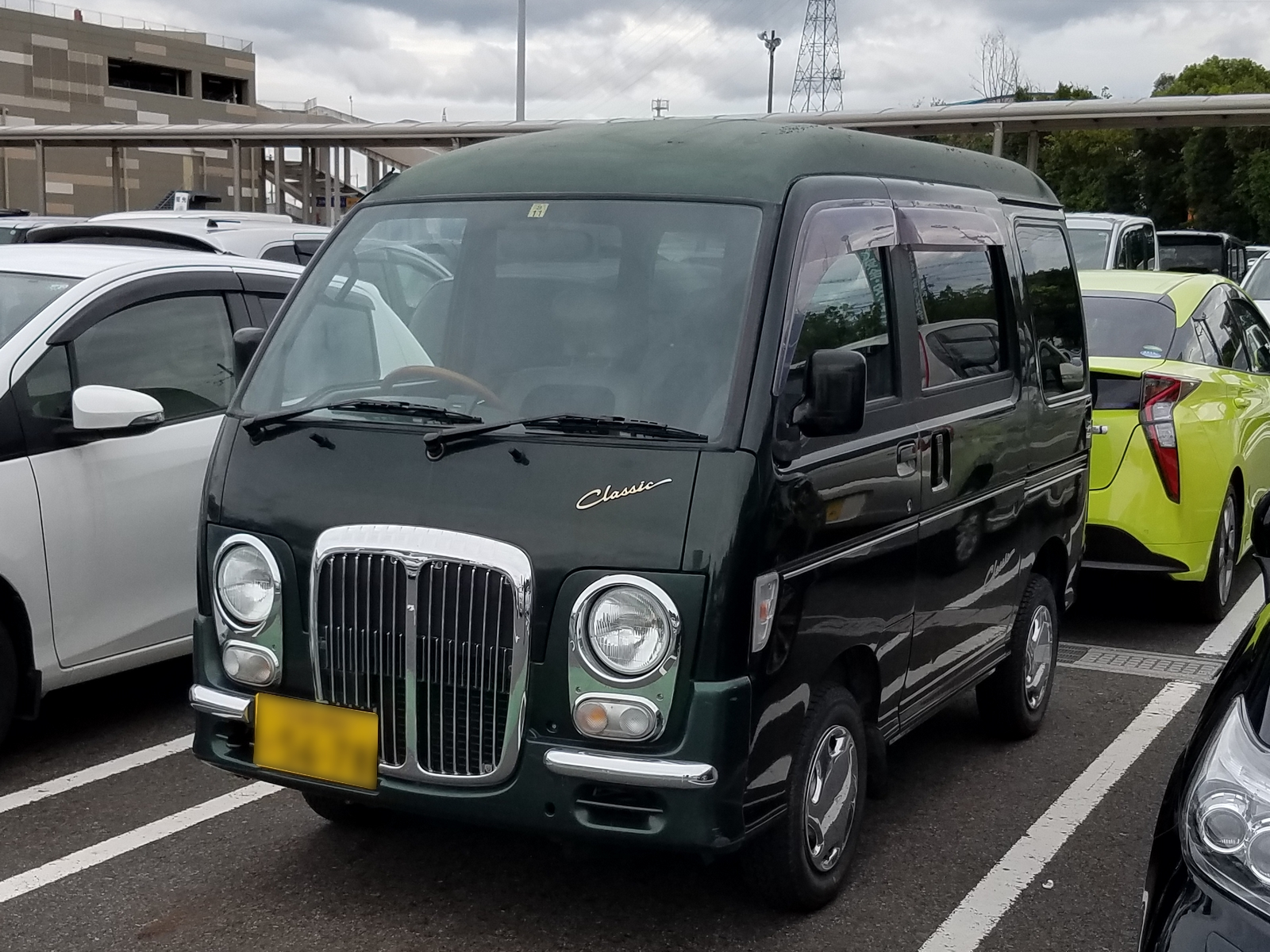
Atrai Classic

== Ninth generation (S200, S210, S220) ==
Ninth generation (S200, S210, S220)
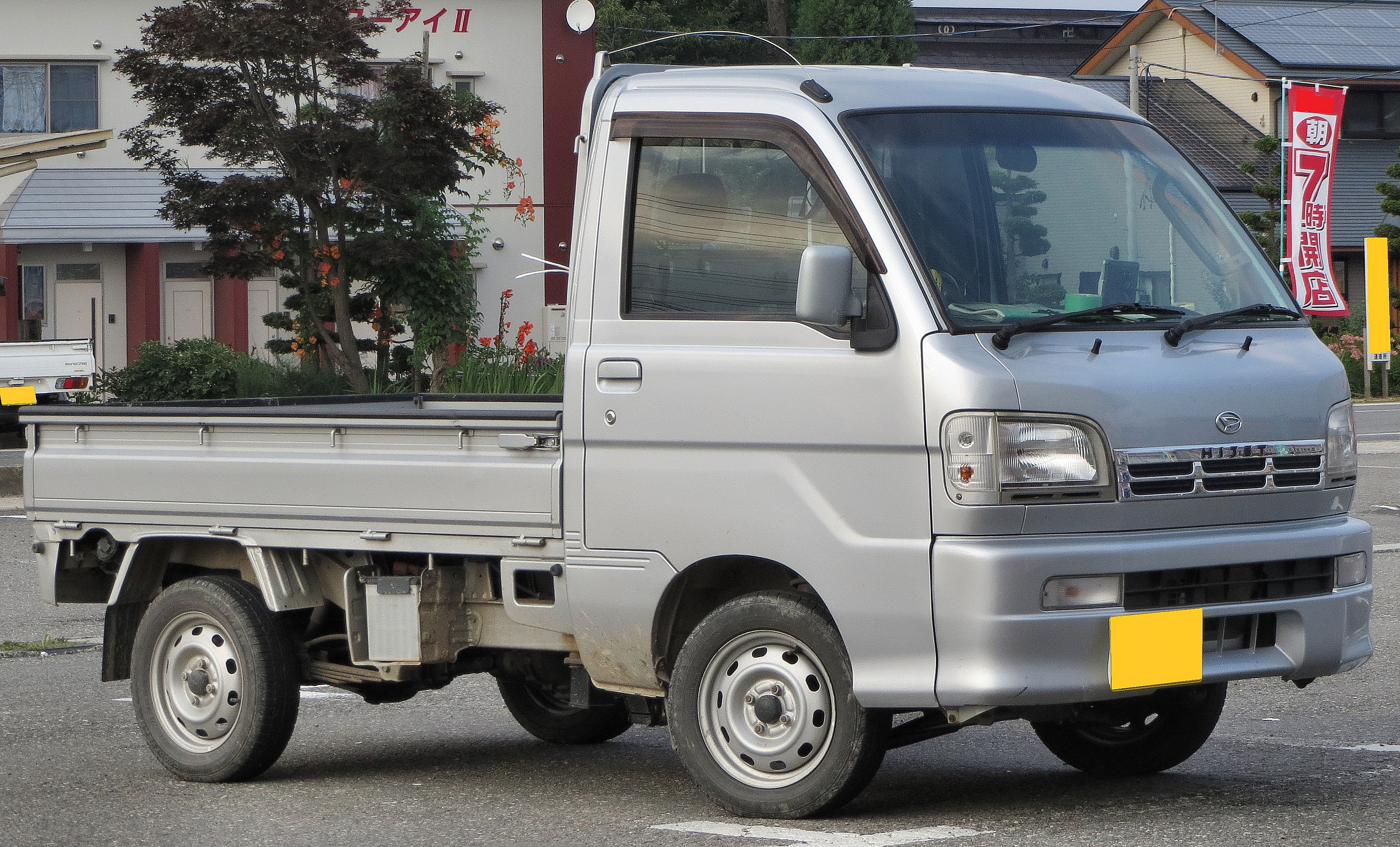
- Pre-facelift Daihatsu Hijet Truck Extra (S210P, 1999–2007)

Overview
- Also called: Daihatsu Atrai (kei van); Daihatsu Atrai 7 (minivan); Daihatsu Hijet Gran Cargo/Extol (commercial minivan); Toyota Pixis (kei truck); Toyota Sparky (minivan); Subaru Sambar (kei truck); Huayang Auto BHQ 6361B (China)
- Production: 1999–2014 (truck); 1999–2004 (van)
- Assembly: Japan: Ikeda, Osaka (Ikeda plant); China: Wuhu (Huayang Auto)
- Designer: Italdesign Giugiaro (van)

Body and chassis
- Class: kei truck/microvan (658 cc models); minivan (1296 cc models)
- Body style: 2-door kei truck; 4-door kei truck; 5-door van/kei van
- Layout: Front mid-engine, rear-wheel-drive or all-wheel drive

Powertrain
- Engine: Gasoline: 658 cc KF-VE I3; 658 cc EF-SE/VE I3; 658 cc EF-DET turbo I3; 1296 cc K3-VE I4
- Transmission: 5-speed manual; 3 or 4-speed automatic

Dimensions
- Wheelbase: 1,900 mm (74.8 in) (truck); 2,430 mm (95.7 in) (minivan)
- Length: 3,395 mm (133.7 in); 3,765 mm (148.2 in) (minivan)
- Width: 1,475 mm (58.1 in); 1,515 mm (59.6 in) (minivan)
- Height: 1,855 mm (73.0 in); 1,895 mm (74.6 in) (minivan)
- Curb weight: 910 kg (2,006 lb); 1,010 kg (2,227 lb) (minivan)

Chronology
- Successor: Daihatsu Boon Luminas (Atrai 7); Daihatsu Gran Max (Hijet Gran Cargo/Extol, indirect); Daihatsu Luxio (Atrai 7, indirect)

When the ninth generation Hijet was introduced in 1999, a divergence between the truck and van versions (Cargo) occurred, with the vans now being of a front-engined "semicab" design rather than the mid-engined cabover design retained for the truck. The Hijet Cargo was designed by Italdesign Giugiaro, while the Hijet Truck was an in-house effort. The S200-series vans were replaced by the tenth generation of the Hijet Cargo in 2004, but the ninth generation of the truck remained in production until July 2014. A similar divergence took place in the Suzuki Carry lineup, necessitated by new crash protection legislations enacted for passenger cars. Since the Hijet Cargo also forms the basis for the passenger use Atrai, it too now has a front-mounted engine.

In December 2007, the Hijet Truck was given a minor update, with light changes to the interior and a new front clip. More importantly, the EF-SE and EF-VE engines were replaced by the new generation KF-VE engine, cleaner and with ten percent lower fuel consumption than the earlier model engine. The chassis code was changed to S201/211 to reflect the changes. A landmark was met in December 2010 when Hijet sales surpassed those of the Suzuki Carry, becoming the kei truck market leader for the first time in 39 years. Beginning in December 2011, the S201 Hijet Truck started being sold by Toyota as the Pixis Truck, together with the tenth generation Van. In April 2012, Subaru entered a similar OEM deal with Daihatsu, selling the Hijet S201 and S321 as the Sambar.

The S201/S211 was manufactured until July 2014, remaining on sale for another four months, until it was replaced by the new S500 truck. There are also panel/box van versions of the truck available; these carry a "C" suffix at the end of the chassis number rather than the "P" of the trucks.

A 1.3-liter seven-seat version (S221G) was also offered, sold as the "Daihatsu Atrai 7". It has bigger bumpers and does not qualify as a kei car. In an OEM deal, this car was also sold as the "Toyota Sparky". Another bigger version of ninth generation Hijet for commercial use was sold as "Daihatsu Hijet Gran Cargo" for Japanese market and as "Daihatsu Extol" for international market. It arrived in July 2000 and was built until the last day of November 2004.

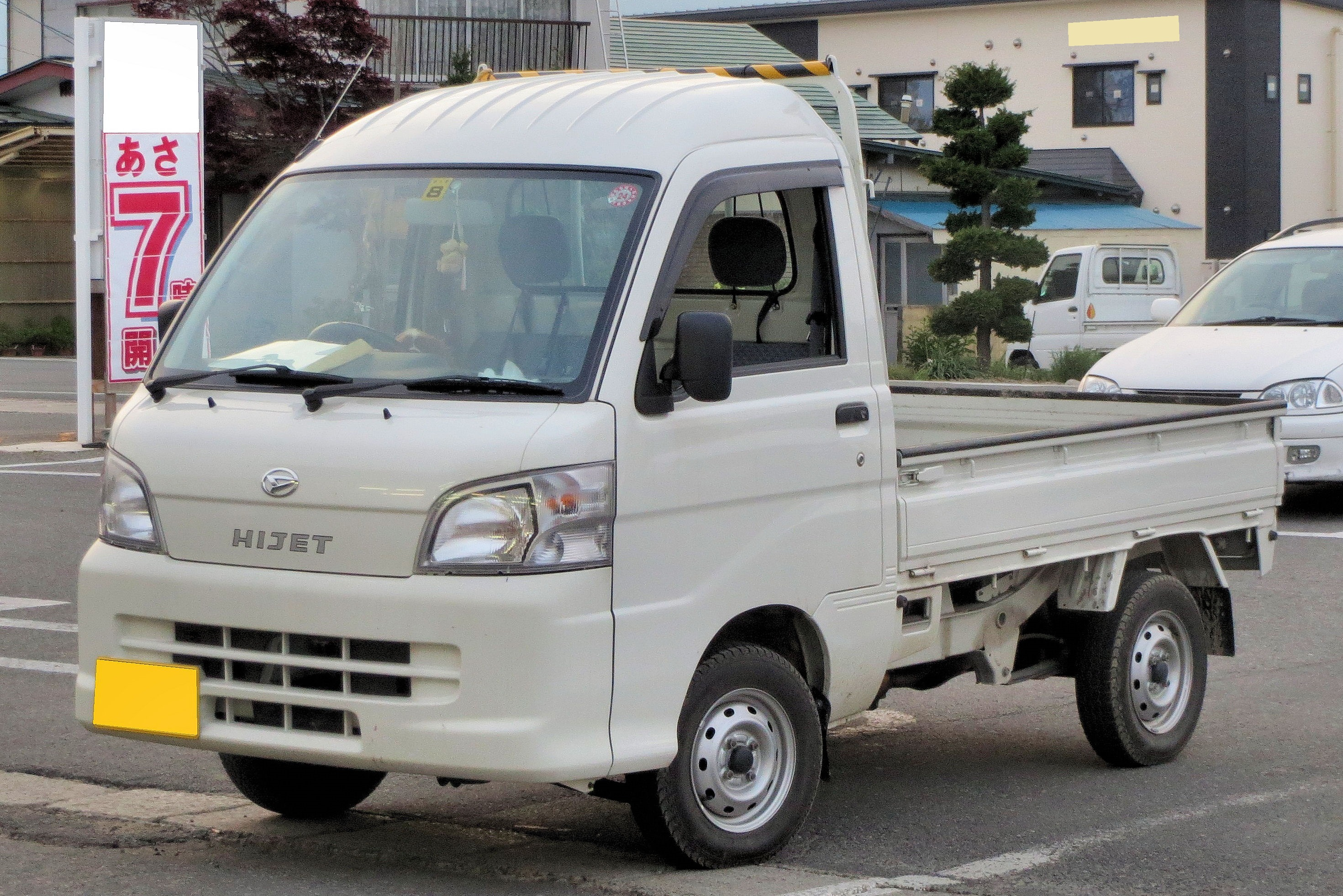
Facelifted Daihatsu Hijet Truck High-Roof (S211P, 2007–2014)

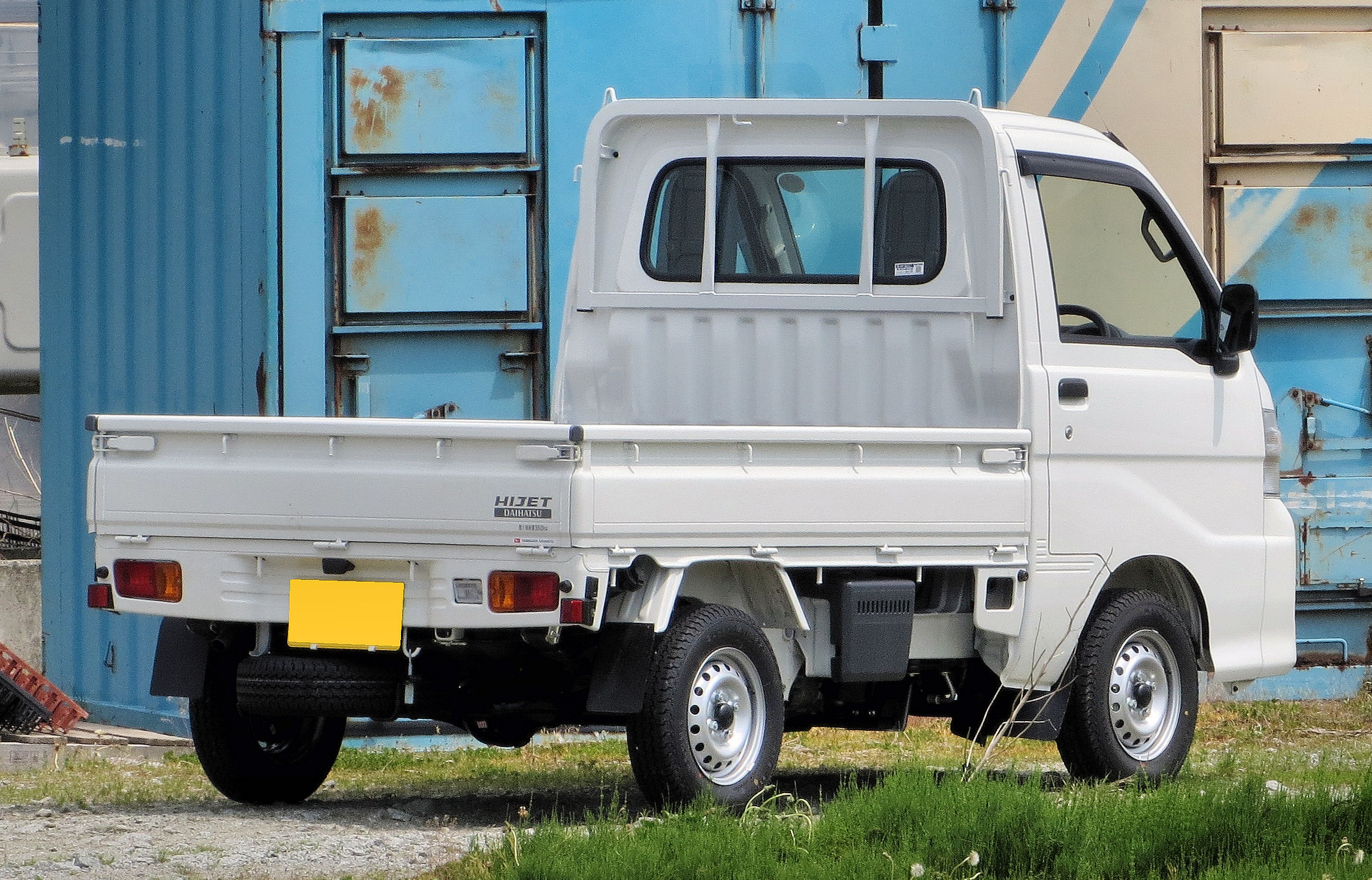
Facelifted Daihatsu Hijet Truck (S211P, 2007–2014)

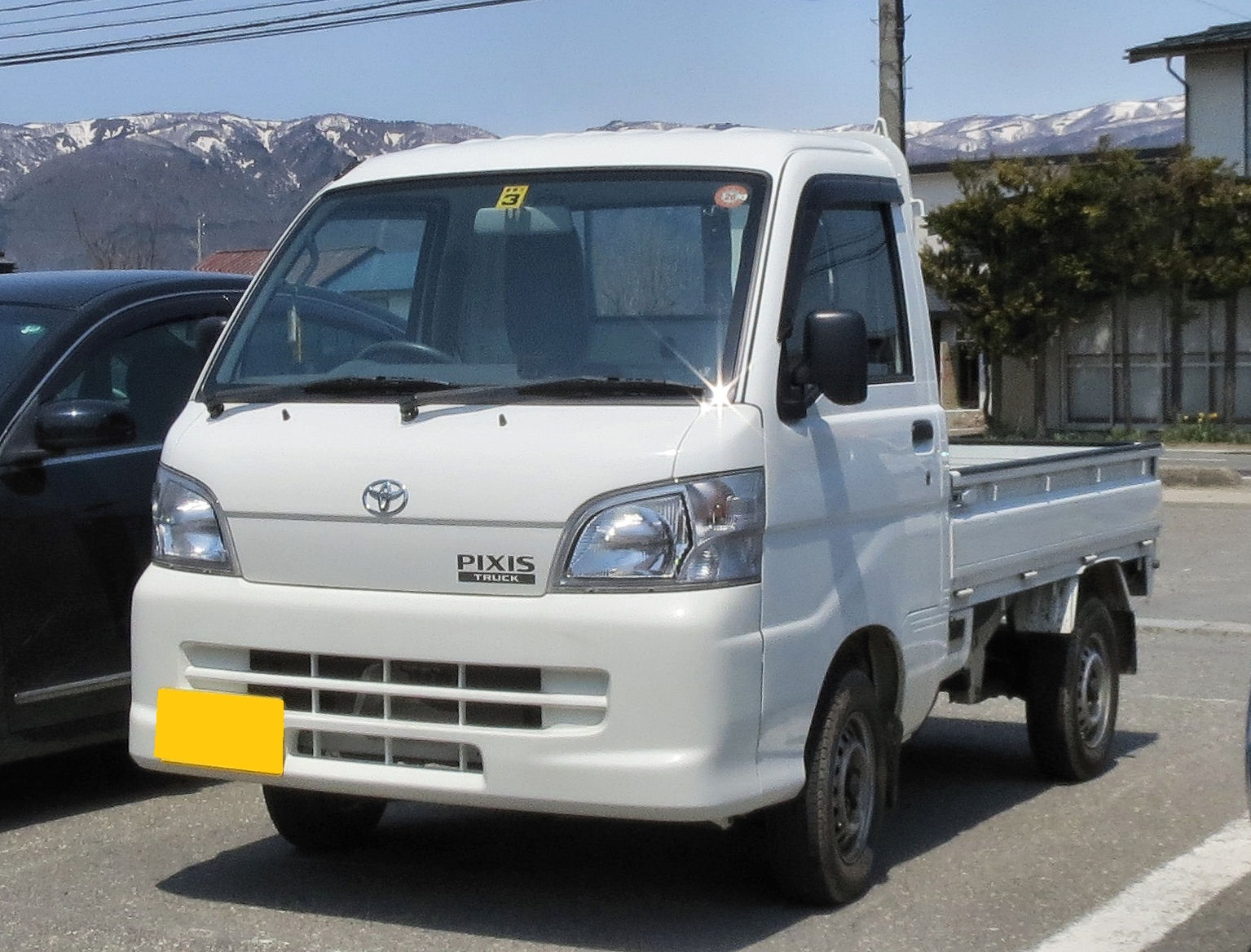
Toyota Pixis Truck (Front view)

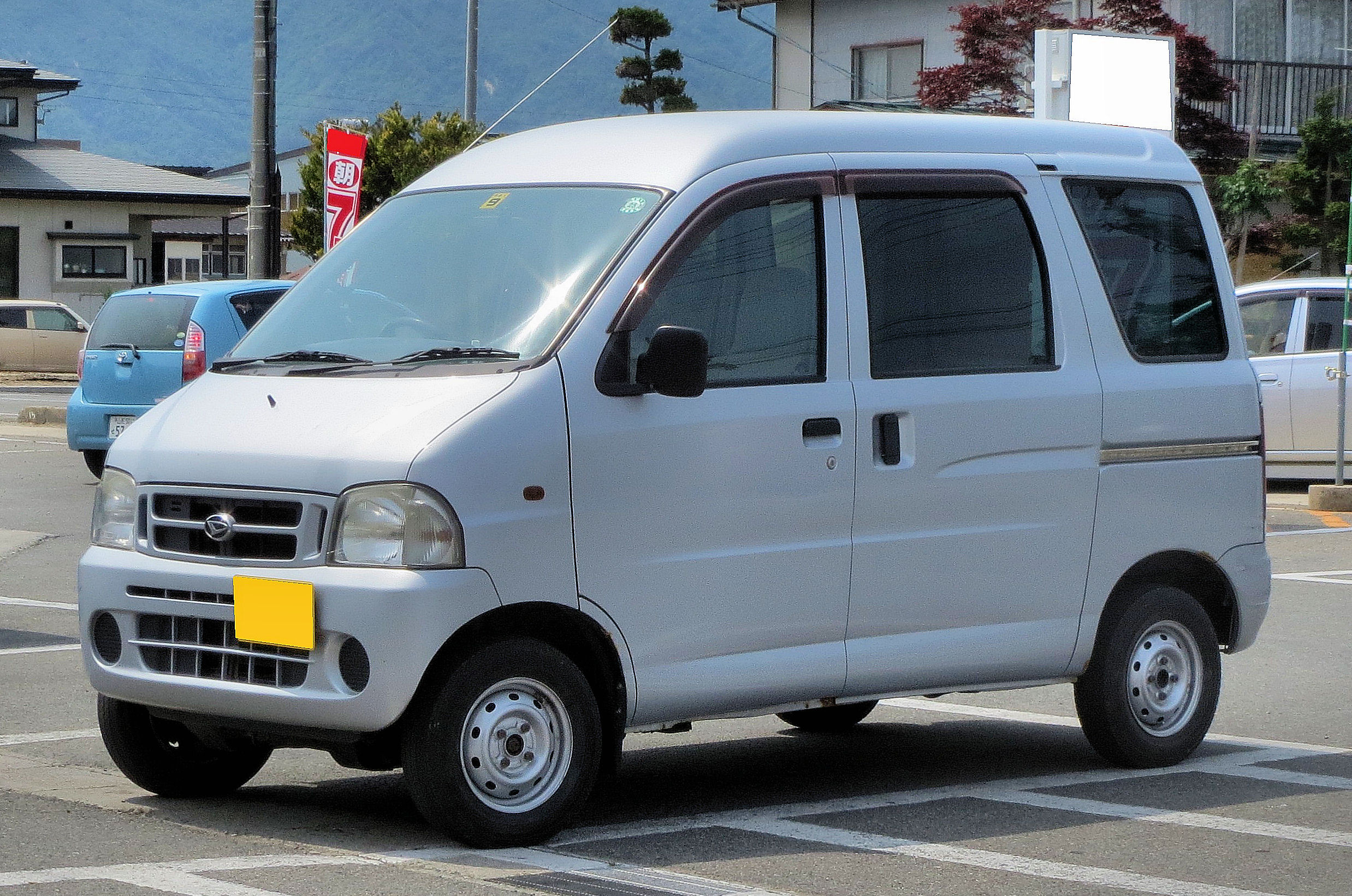
Pre-facelift Daihatsu Hijet Cargo (S210V, 1999–2001), designed by Giugiaro

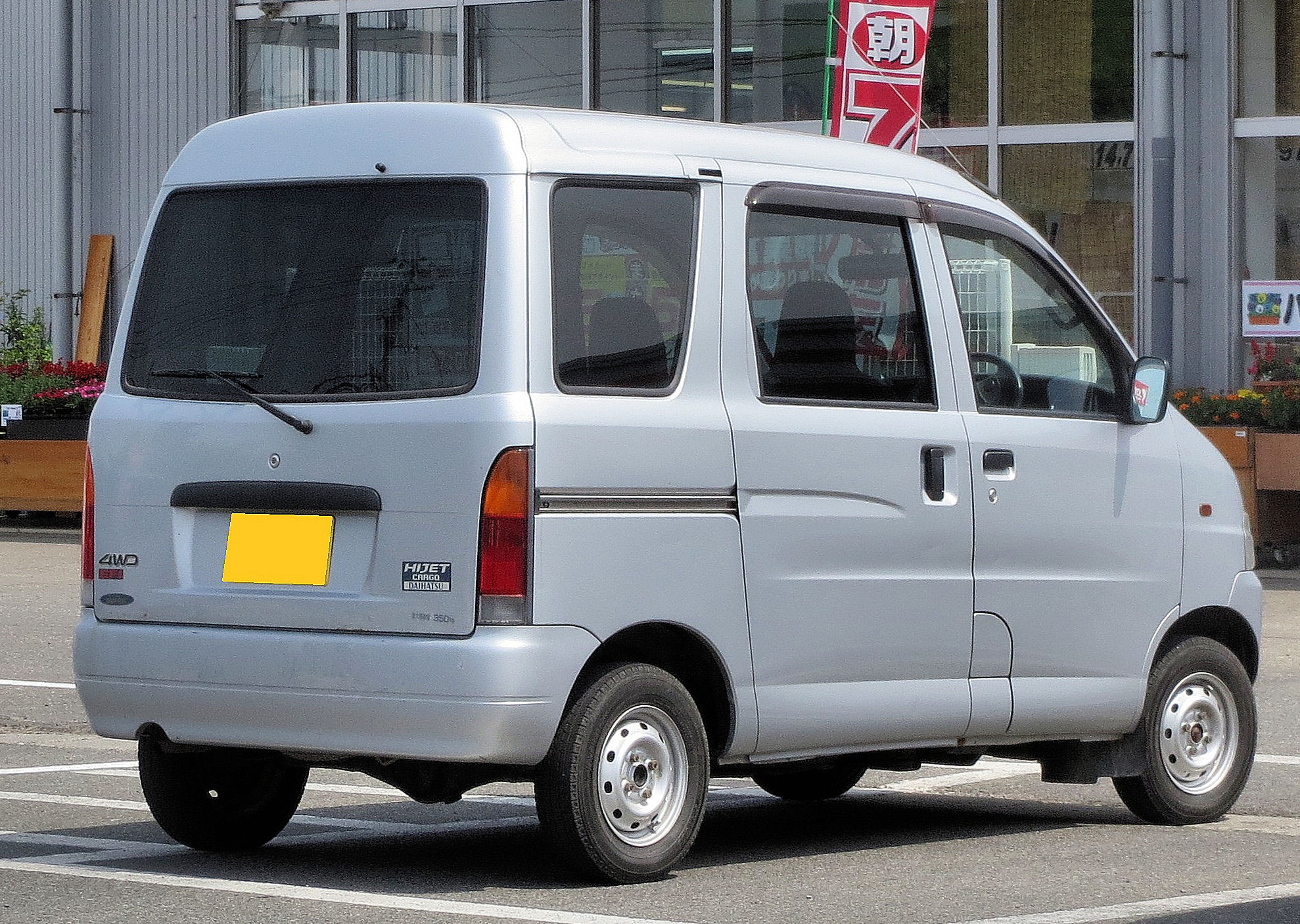
Pre-facelift Daihatsu Hijet Cargo (S210V, 1999–2001)

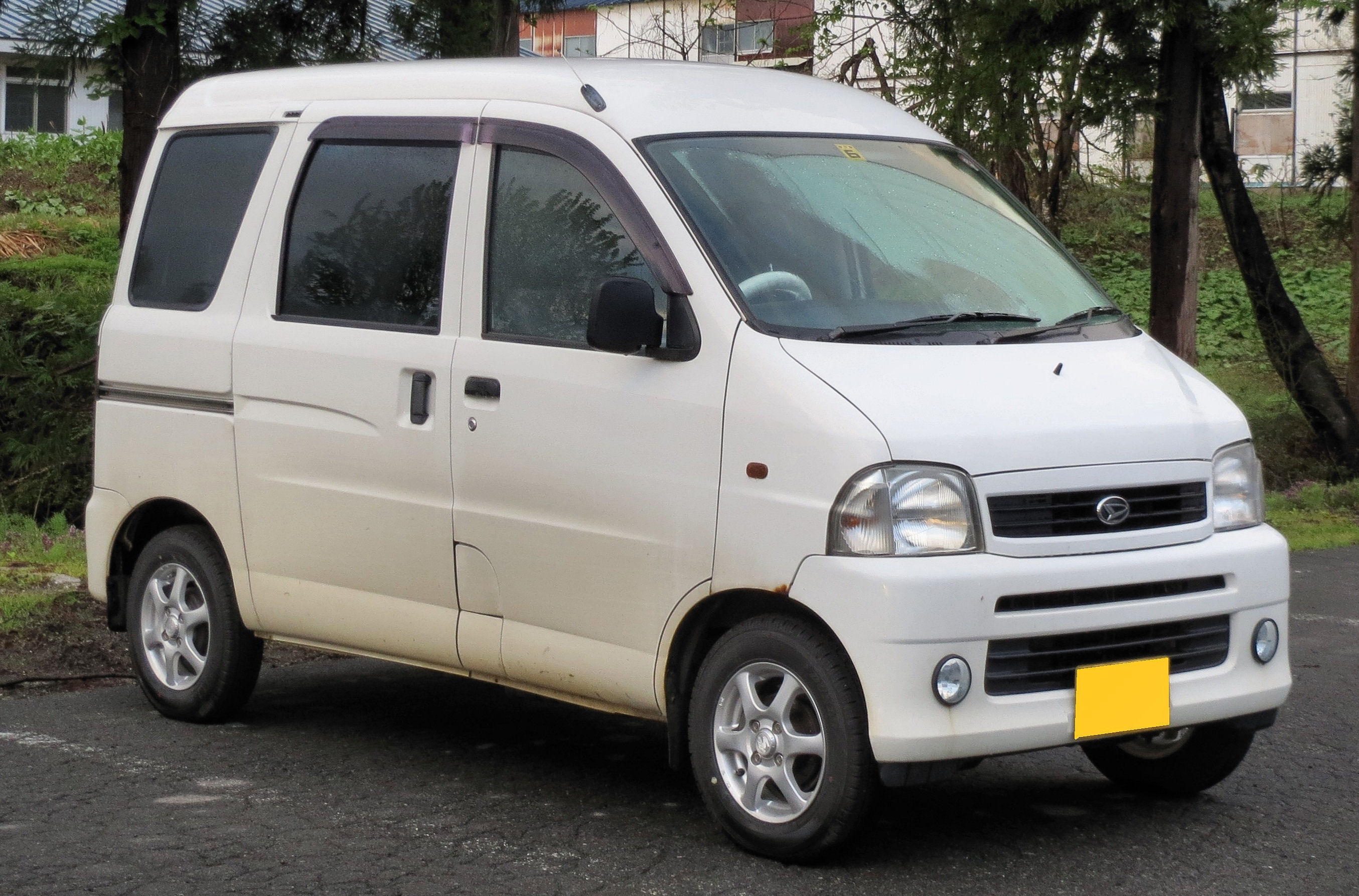
Facelifted Daihatsu Hijet Cargo (S210V, 2001–2004)

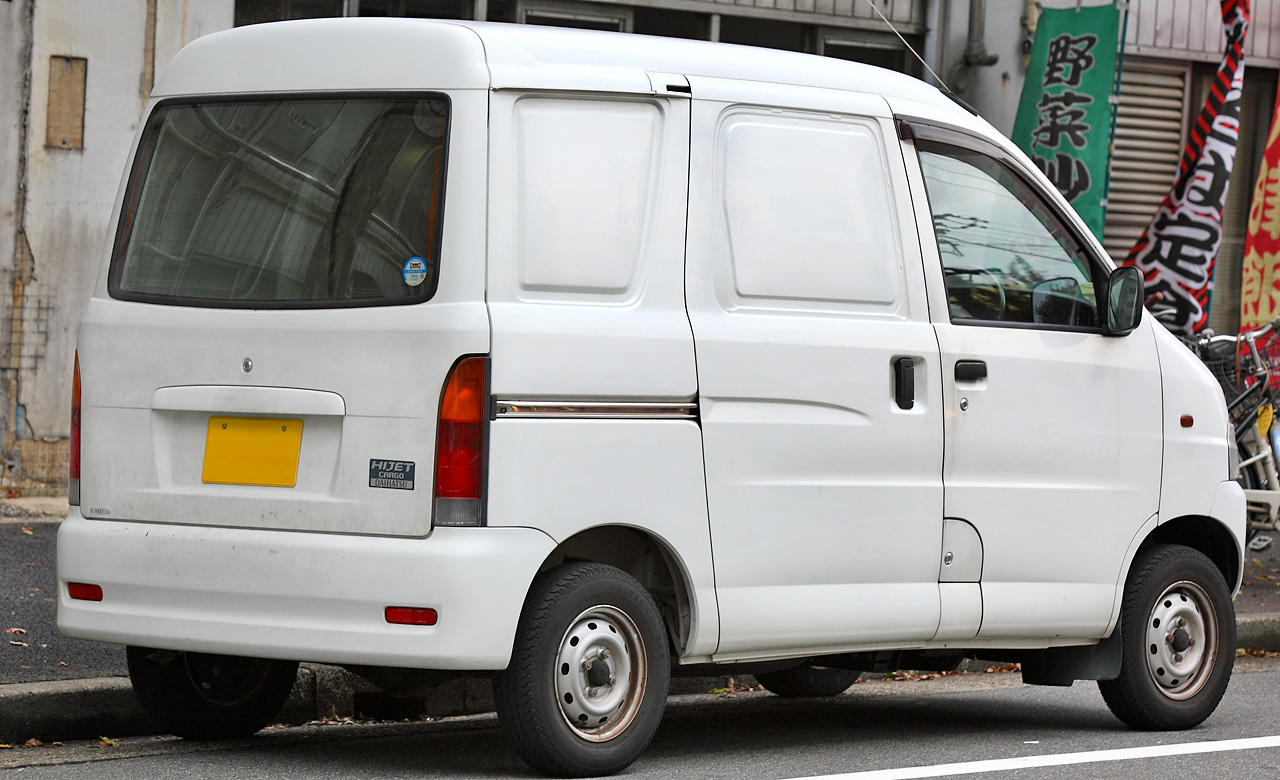
Facelifted Daihatsu Hijet Cargo (S210V, 2001–2004)

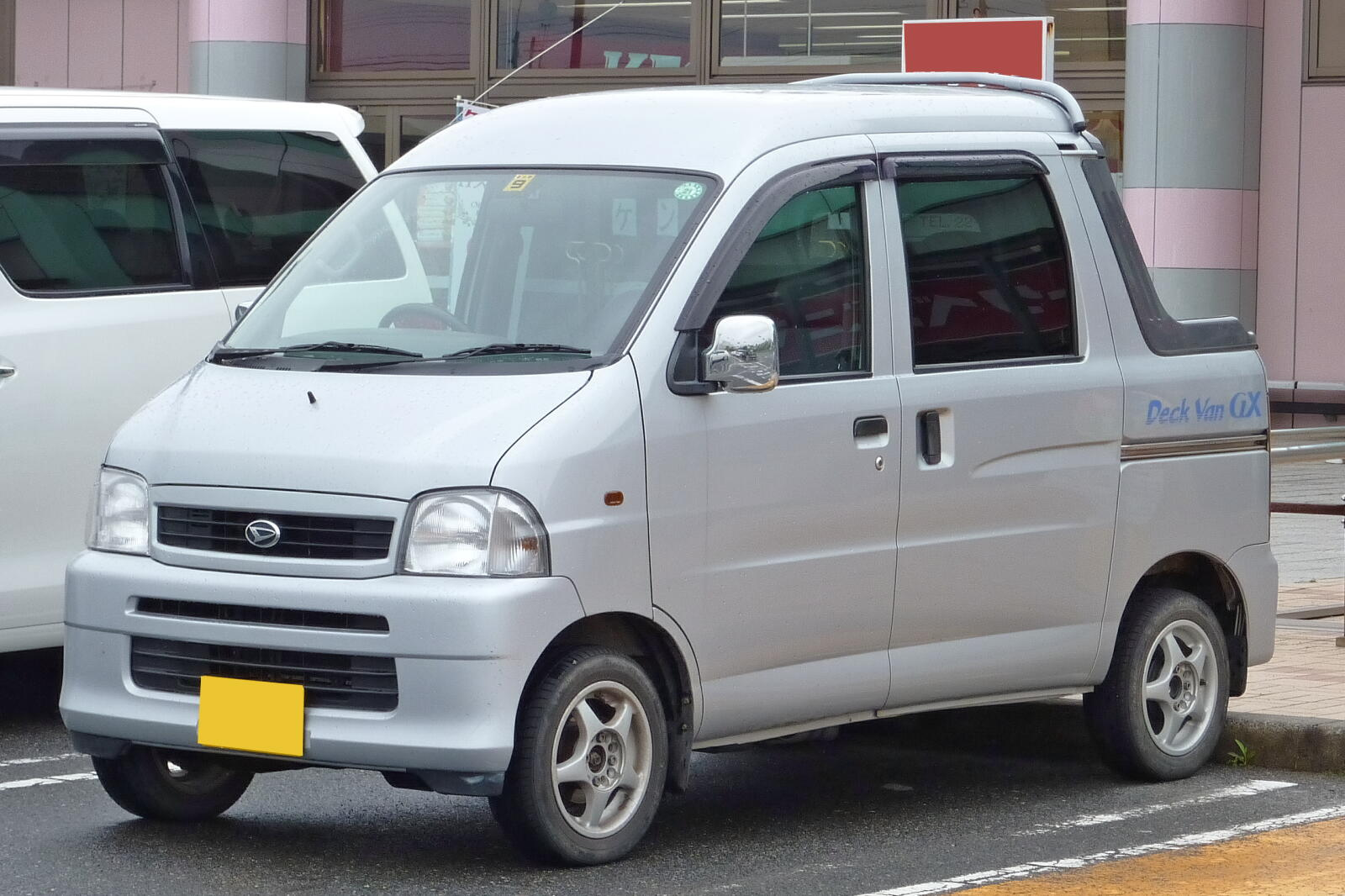
Facelifted Daihatsu Hijet Deck-Van (S200W, 2001–2004), a cargo mixed-use derivative of the Hijet Cargo

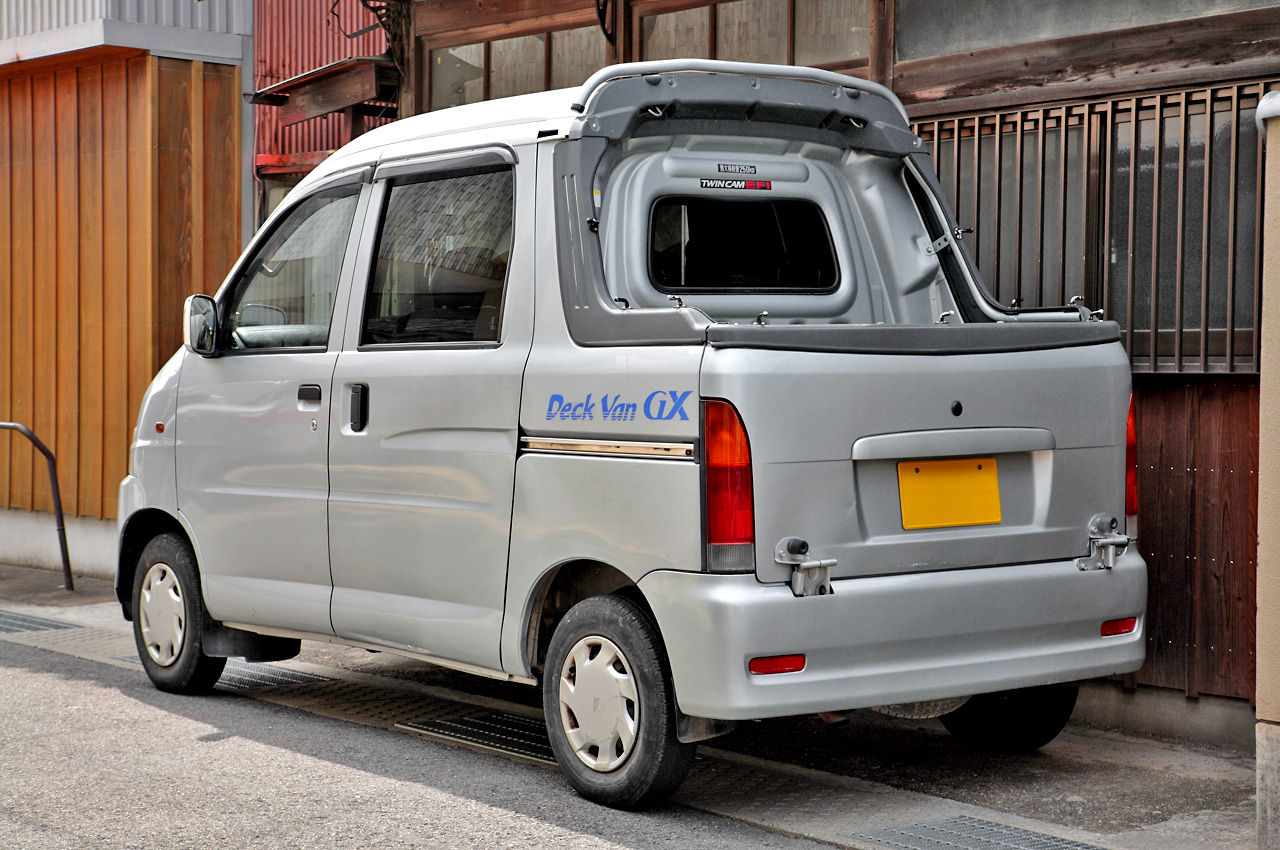
Facelifted Daihatsu Hijet Deck-Van (S200W, 2001–2004)

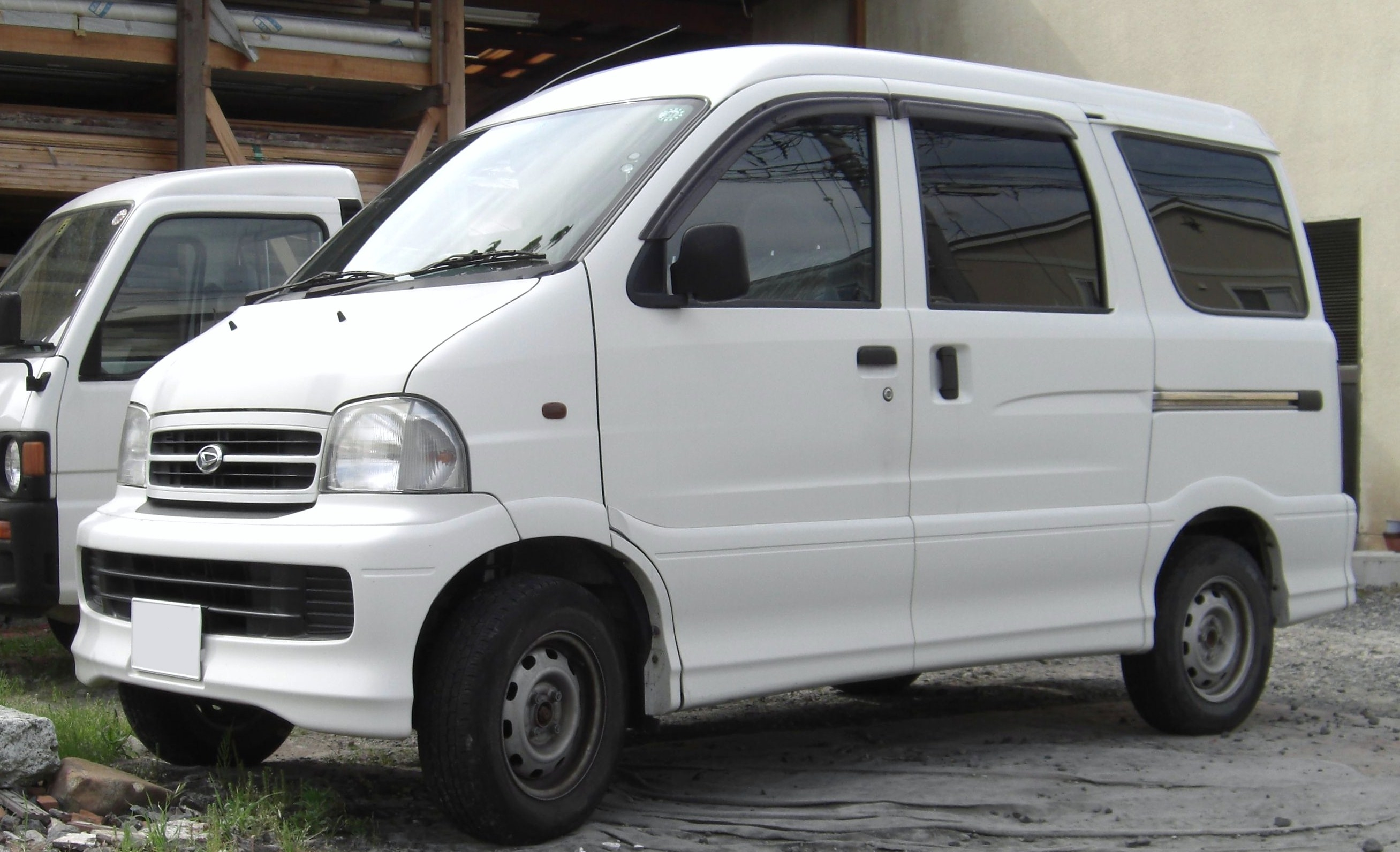
Daihatsu Hijet Gran Cargo (2001–2004)

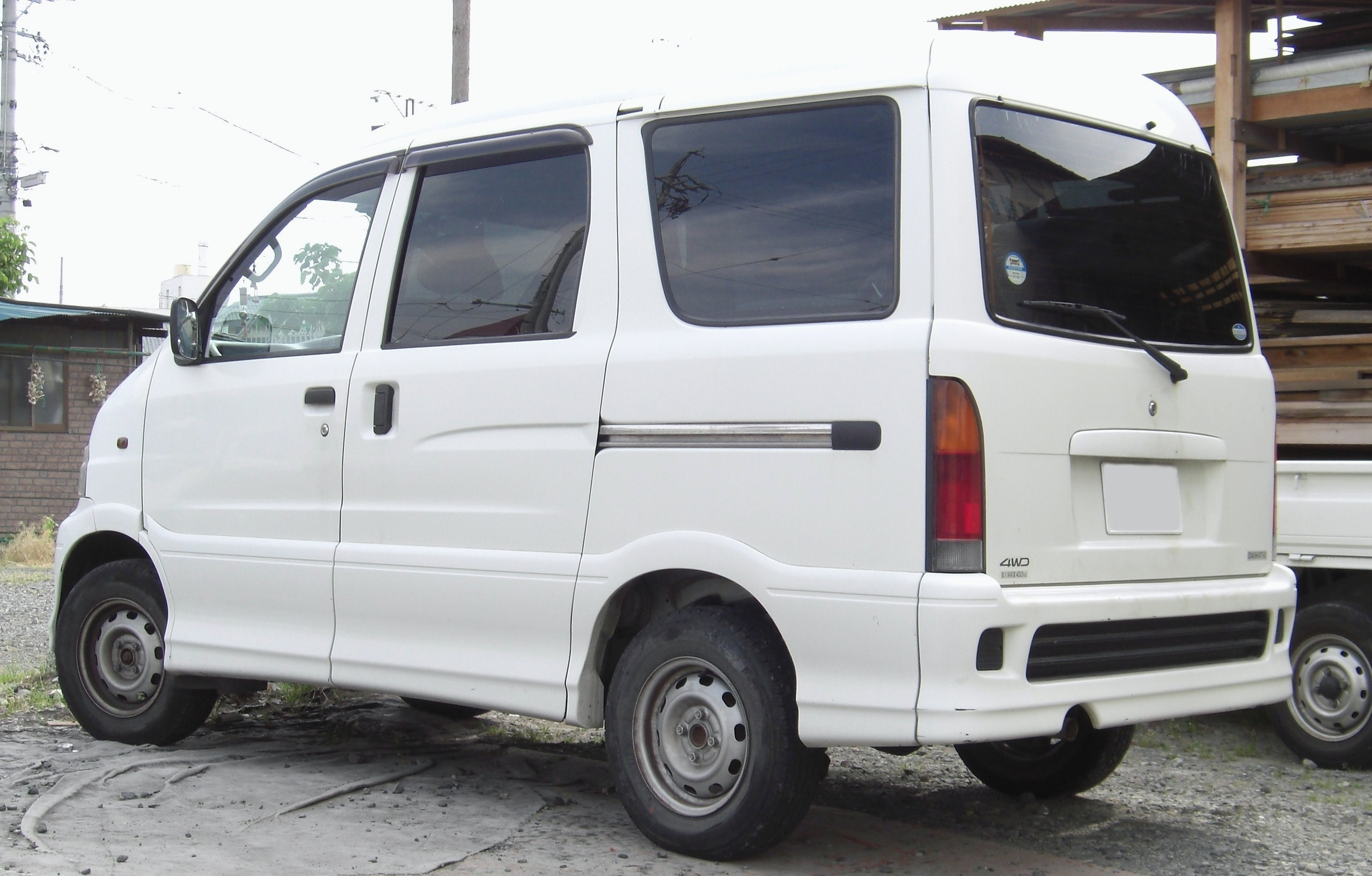
Daihatsu Hijet Gran Cargo (2001–2004)

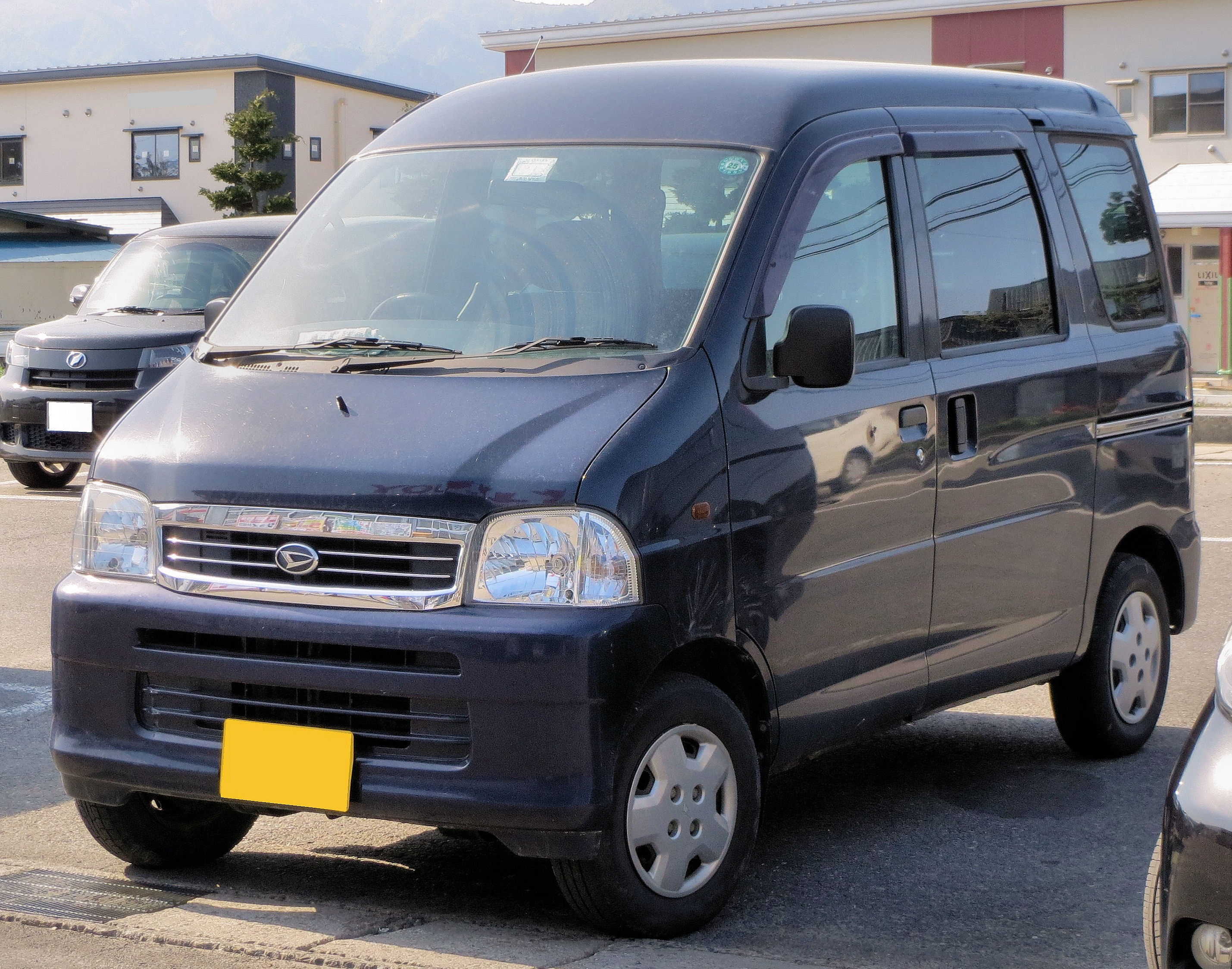
Pre-facelift Daihatsu Atrai Wagon (S230G, 1999–2000)

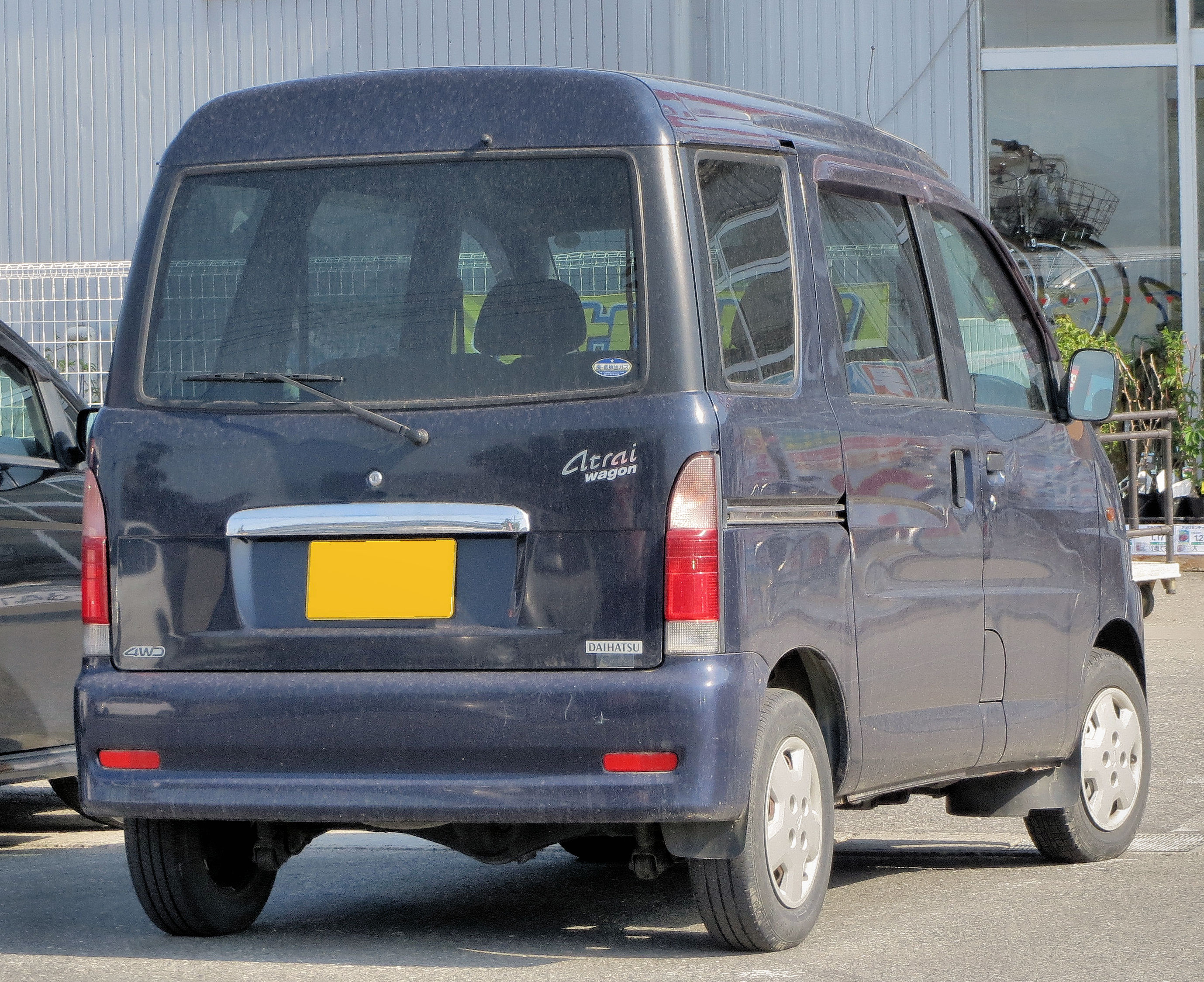
Pre-facelift Daihatsu Atrai Wagon (S230G, 1999–2000)

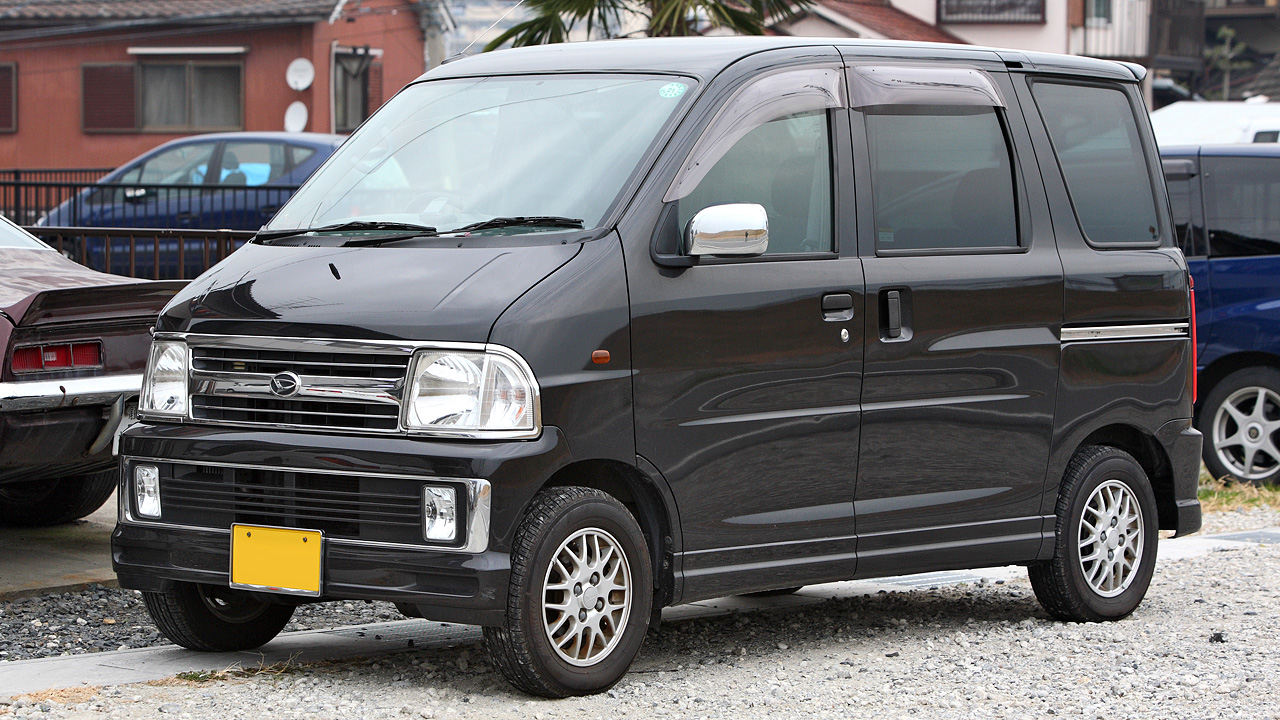
Facelifted Daihatsu Atrai Wagon (2001–2005)

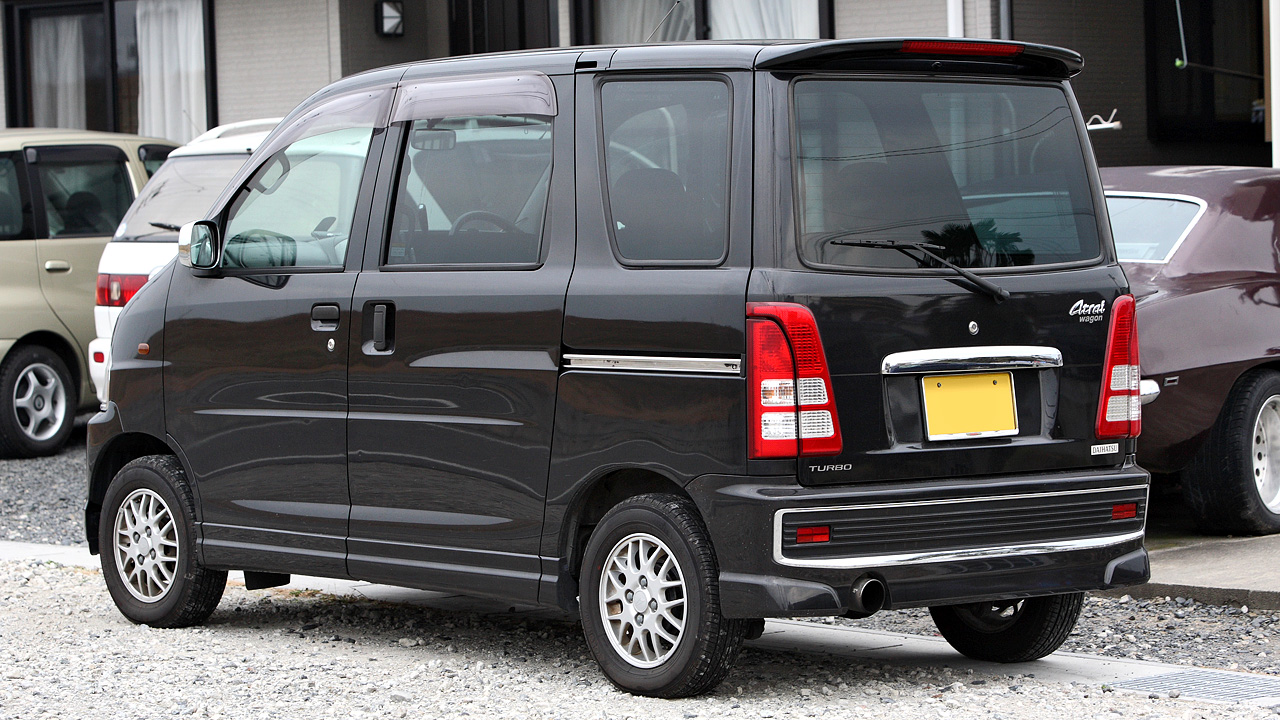
Facelifted Daihatsu Atrai Wagon (2001–2005)

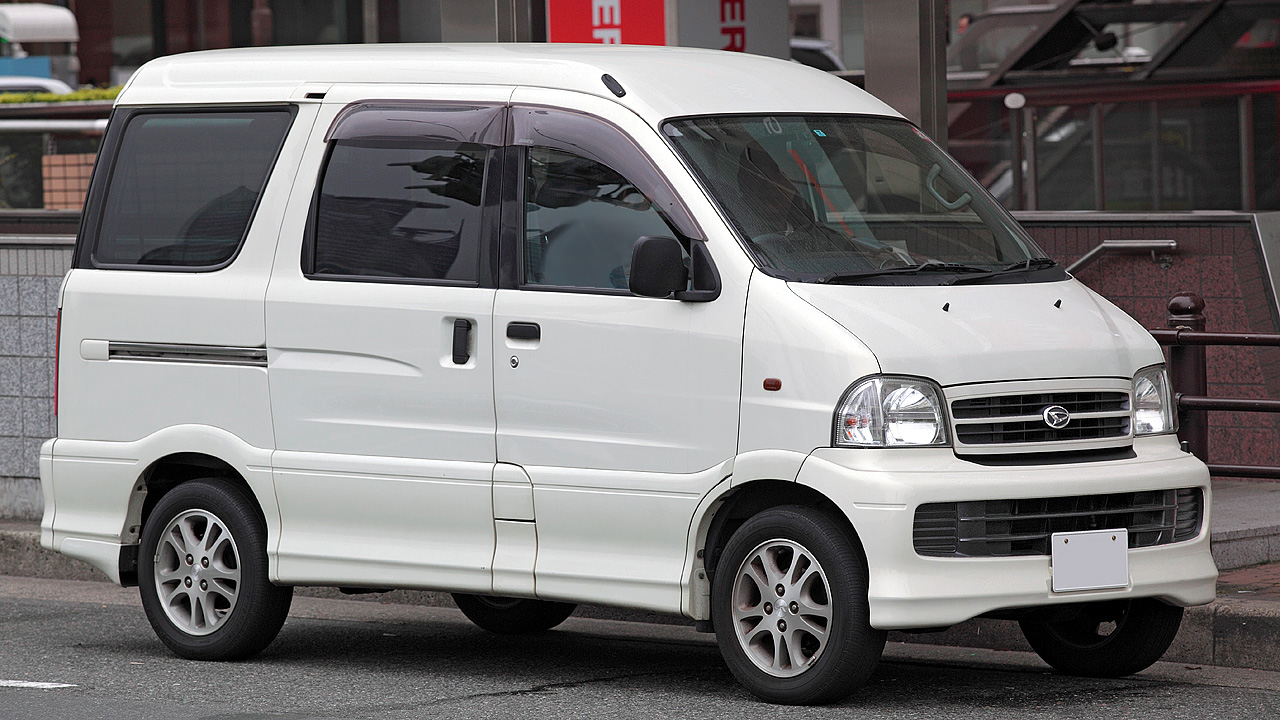
Daihatsu Atrai 7 (S221G, 2000–2004)

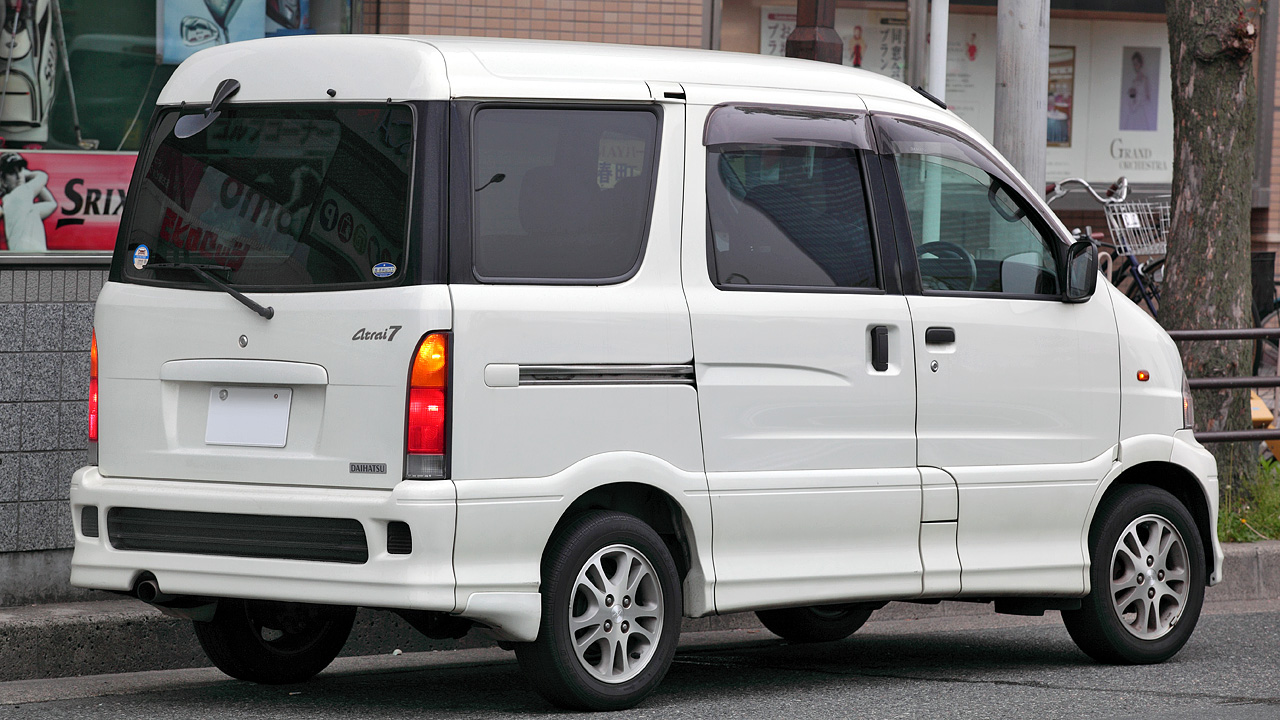
Daihatsu Atrai 7 (S221G, 2000–2004)

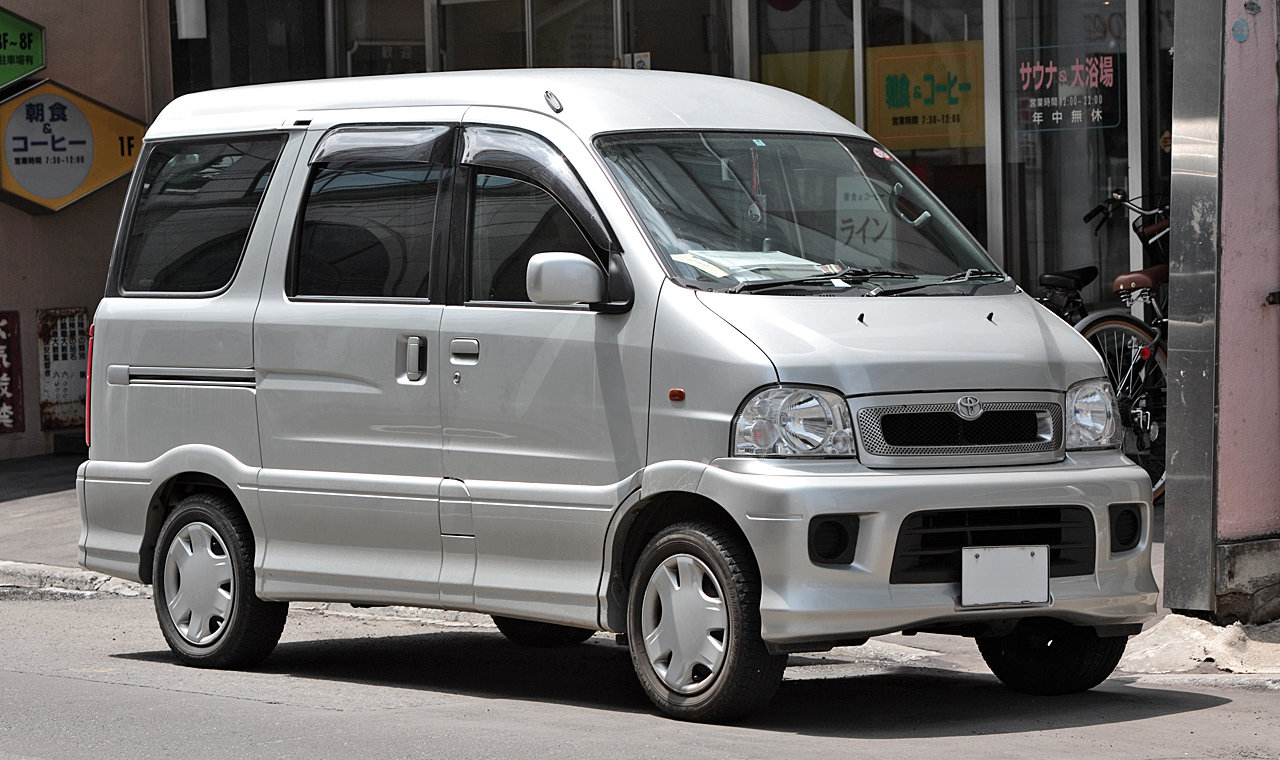
Toyota Sparky (S221E, 2000–2003)

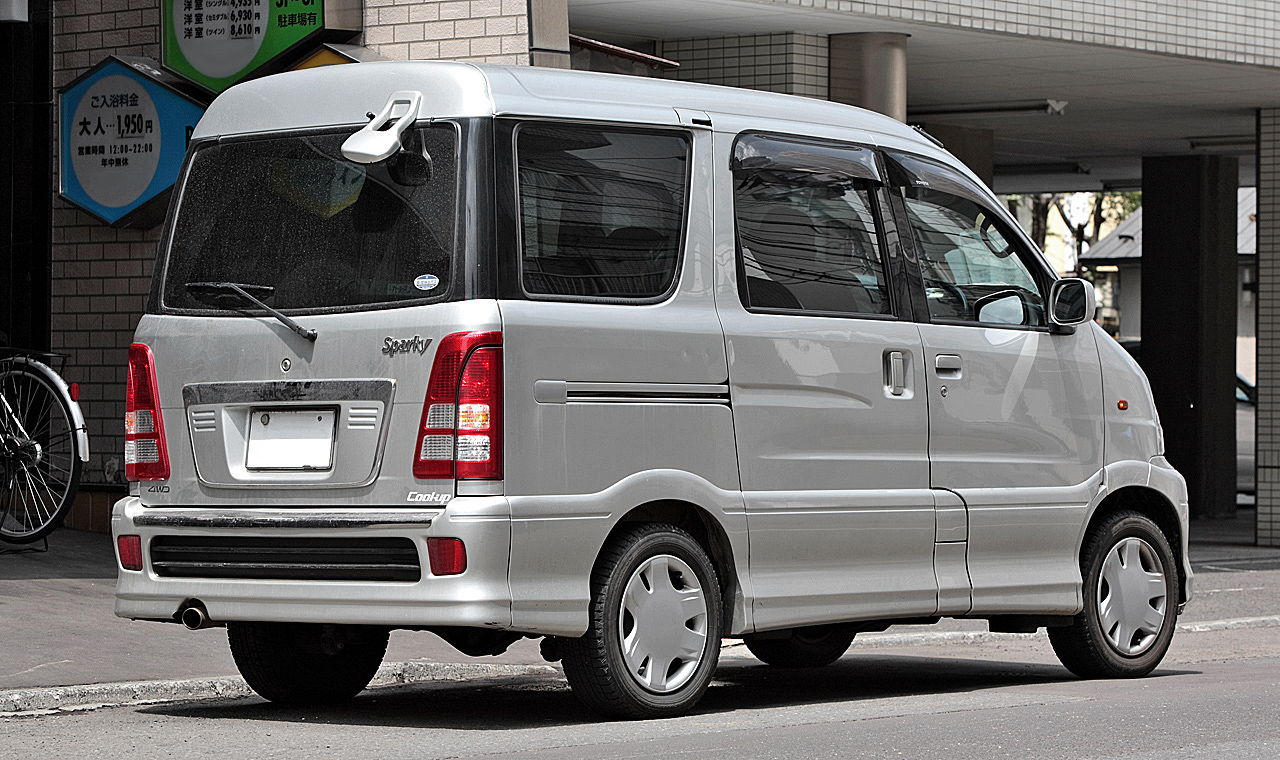
Toyota Sparky (S221E, 2000–2003)

== Tenth generation (S320, S321, S330, S331, S500, S510) ==
=== Hijet Cargo/Atrai (S320, S330) ===
Hijet Cargo / Atrai (S320, S321, S330, S331)
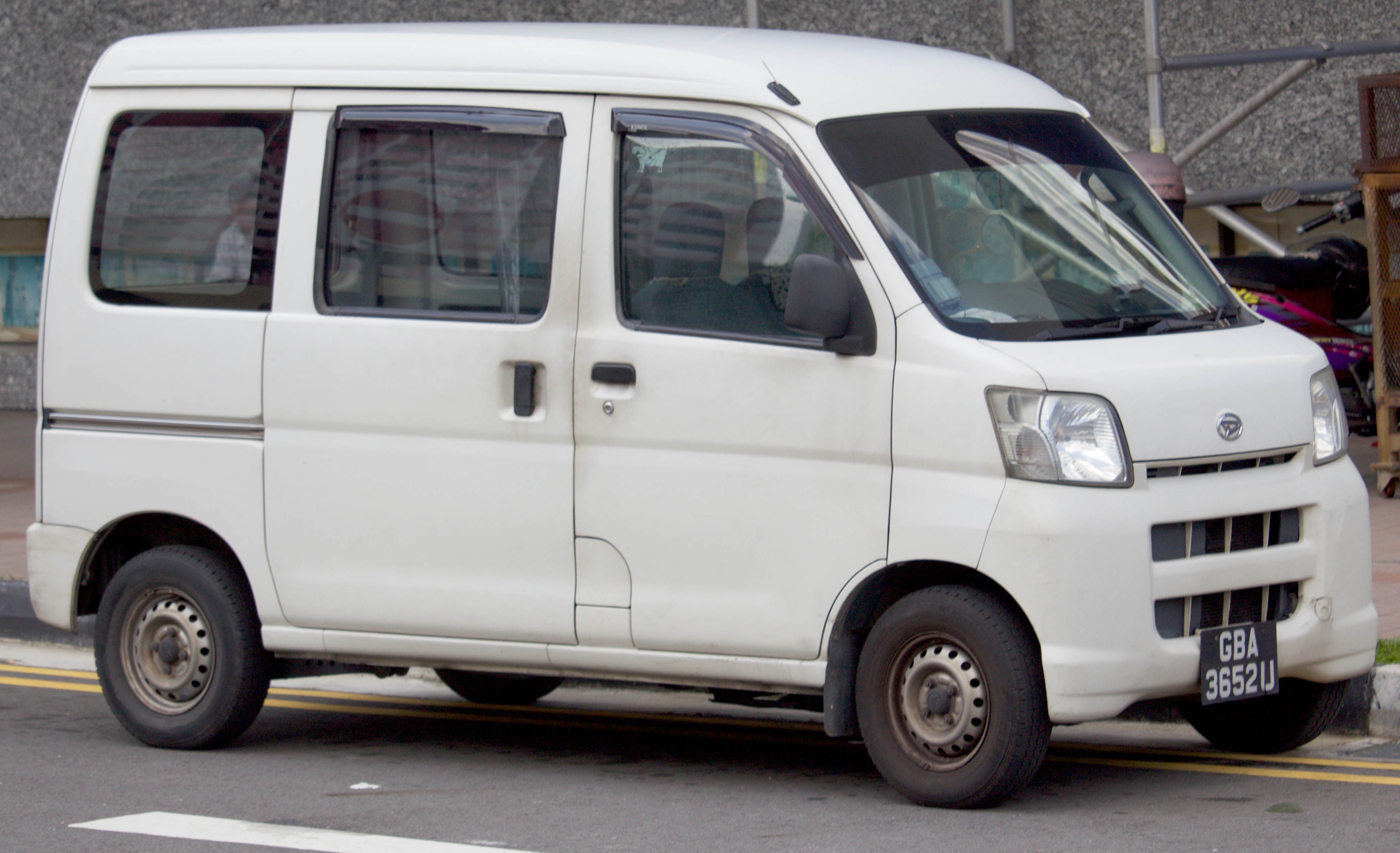
- Pre-facelift Daihatsu Hijet Cargo Deluxe (S320V)

Overview
- Also called: Daihatsu Atrai (passenger van; 2005–2021); Subaru Dias Wagon (passenger van); Toyota Pixis Van; Subaru Sambar Van
- Production: 2004–2021
- Assembly: Japan: Nakatsu, Ōita (Daihatsu Auto Body/Daihatsu Motor Kyushu)

Body and chassis
- Class: Microvan (Japan)
- Body style: 5-door kei van/panel van; 4-door kei truck (Deck Van)
- Layout: Front mid-engine, rear-wheel-drive or all-wheel drive

Powertrain
- Engine: Gasoline: 658 cc KF-VE I3; 658 cc KF-DET turbo I3; 659 cc EF-SE/VE I3; 659 cc EF-DET turbo I3
- Transmission: 5-speed manual 3 or 4-speed automatic

Dimensions
- Wheelbase: 2,400 mm (94.5 in)
- Length: 3,395 mm (133.7 in)
- Width: 1,475 mm (58.1 in)

The tenth generation Hijet was introduced in December 2004. The tenth generation was only available in van form, with the trucks remaining the ninth generation cabover model until September 2014, when the tenth generation trucks came out. The truck and van lines have diverged completely, sharing mainly the engines and the name. In Japan, the passenger car version of the Hijet is known as the "Daihatsu Atrai", which is also powered by a 660 cc Turbo engine producing 64 PS (47 kW). Available engines from 2004 until late 2007 include the DVVT equipped 660 cc EF-VE, making 53 PS (39 kW) at 7000 rpm and 63 N⋅m (46 lb⋅ft) of torque at 4000 rpm when equipped with an automatic transmission, three horsepower less with a manual, and the 660 cc EF-SE, making 45 PS (33 kW) at 5900 rpm and 57 N⋅m (42 lb⋅ft) of torque at 3600 rpm. The base model is mid-engined with rear-wheel drive, but four-wheel drive versions (S330-series) are also available. The passenger car version called Atrai was released on 9 May 2005.

As of December 2007, the chassis numbers changed from S320/S330 to S321/S331 to reflect the shift to the new, more efficient KF engine. Only the Hijet Cargo Hybrid retained the earlier EF-series engine. The front bumper and grille were revised at the same time, getting a more sculpted, somewhat busier look. The Hybrid was discontinued in April 2010, as the hybrid drive system proved a bit too expensive for a microcar, while returning negligible fuel economy benefits for what is already a very efficient vehicle. In April 2015, the Cargo received a minor update, changing to a new four-speed automatic and an electronic throttle system (as recently introduced on the S500 Hijet Truck). In November 2017, the Hijet/Atrai received a thorough facelift, with a redesigned front treatment with a prominent trapezoidal grille.

The tenth generation Van/Microbus as well as the ninth and tenth generation truck have also been marketed in Japan by Toyota since December 2011. They are called "Toyota Pixis" Van and Truck respectively. As for the Hijet, they have the new KF engine of 660 cc.

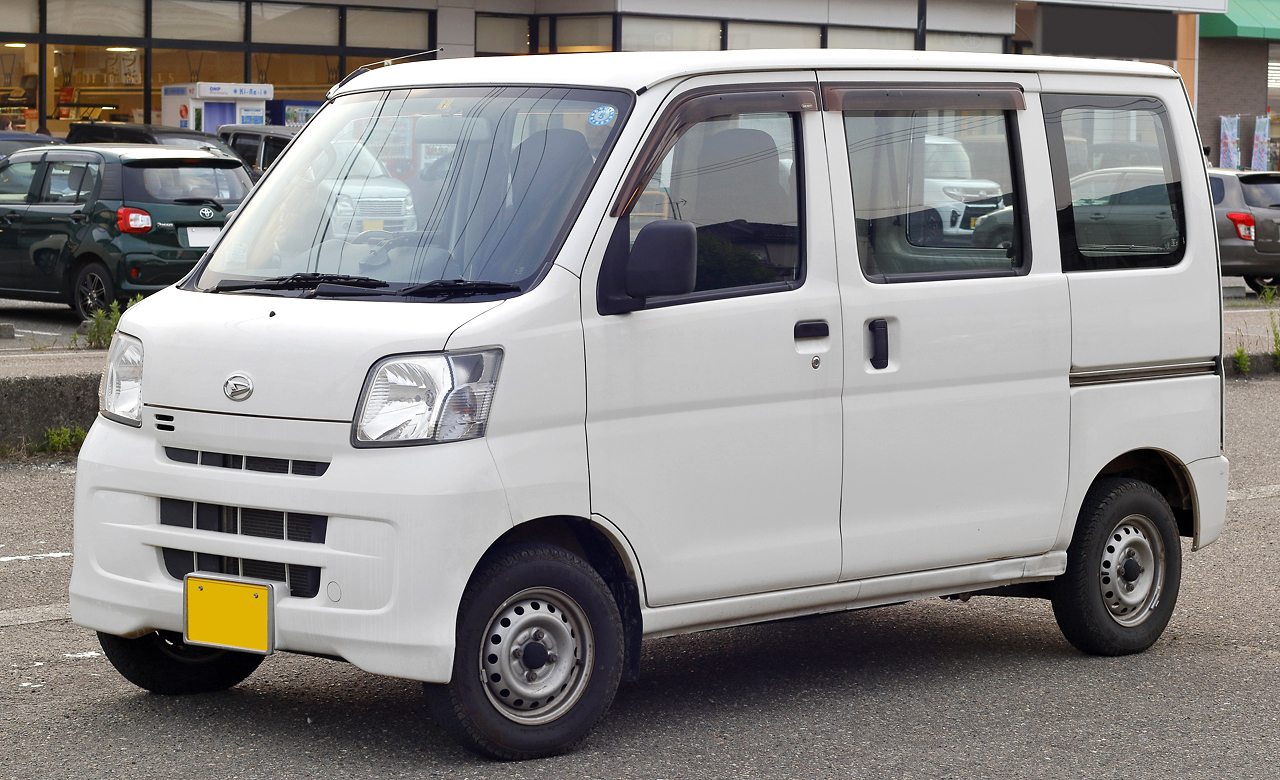
The first facelift model (2007-2017) Hijet Cargo standard-roof Deluxe (S321V)

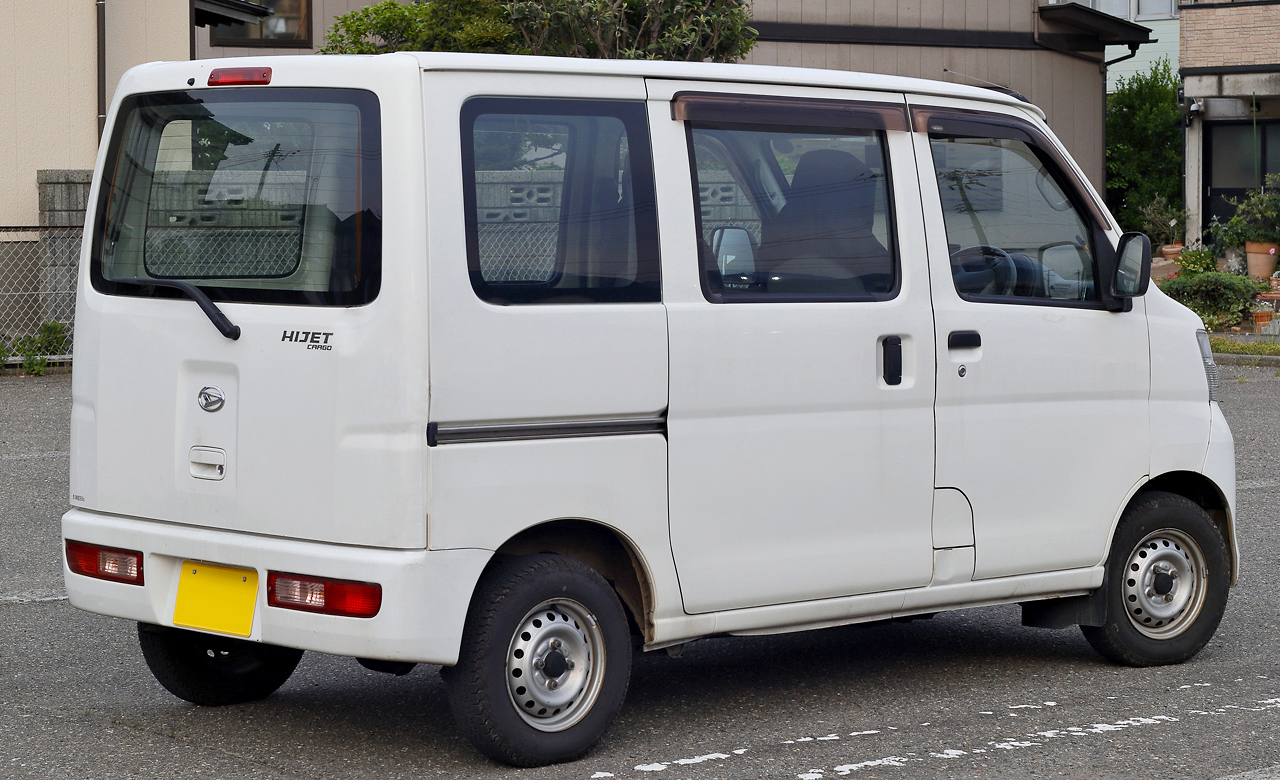
The first facelift model (2007-2017) Hijet Cargo standard-roof Deluxe (S321V)

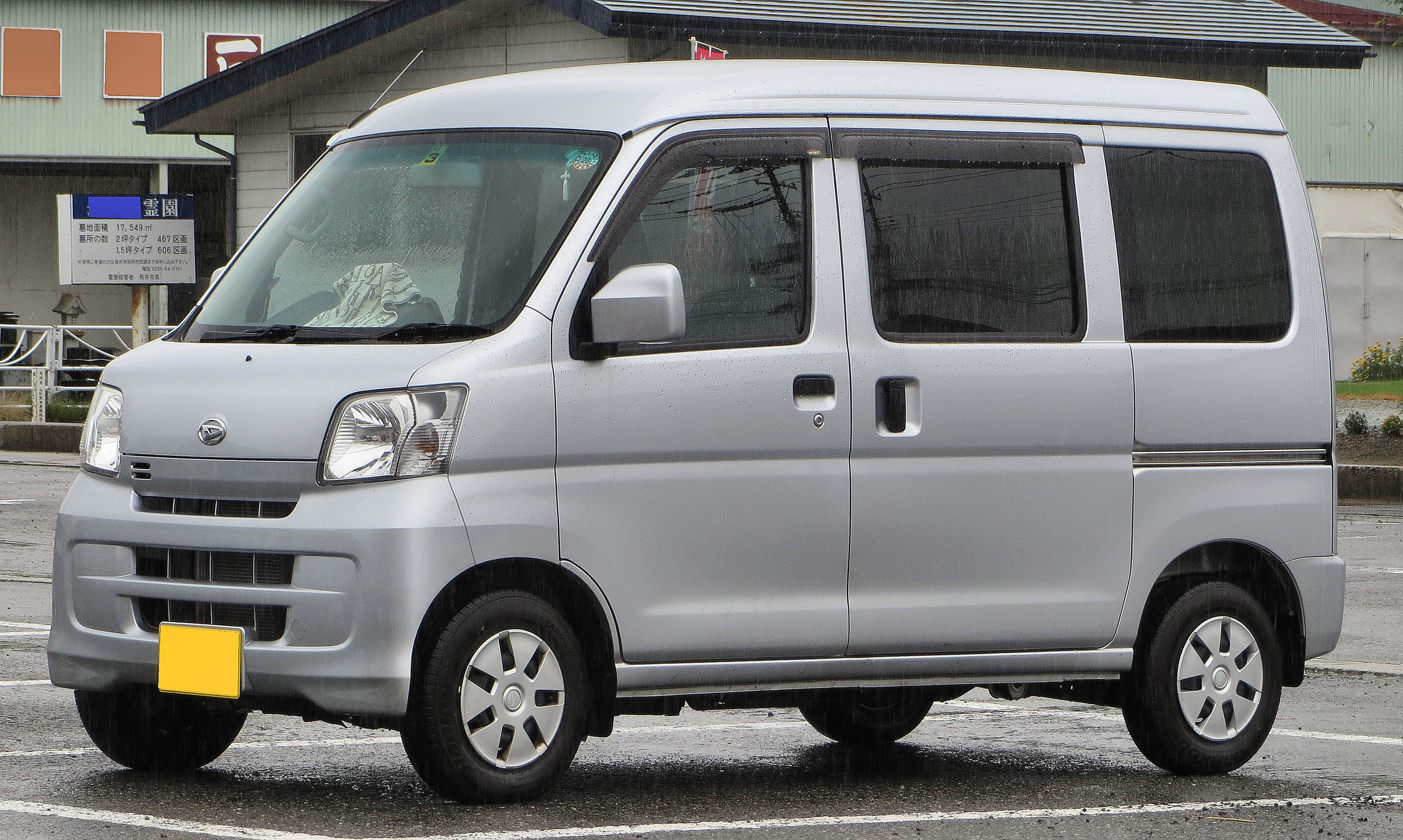
The well-equipped Hijet Cargo Cruise (S331V)

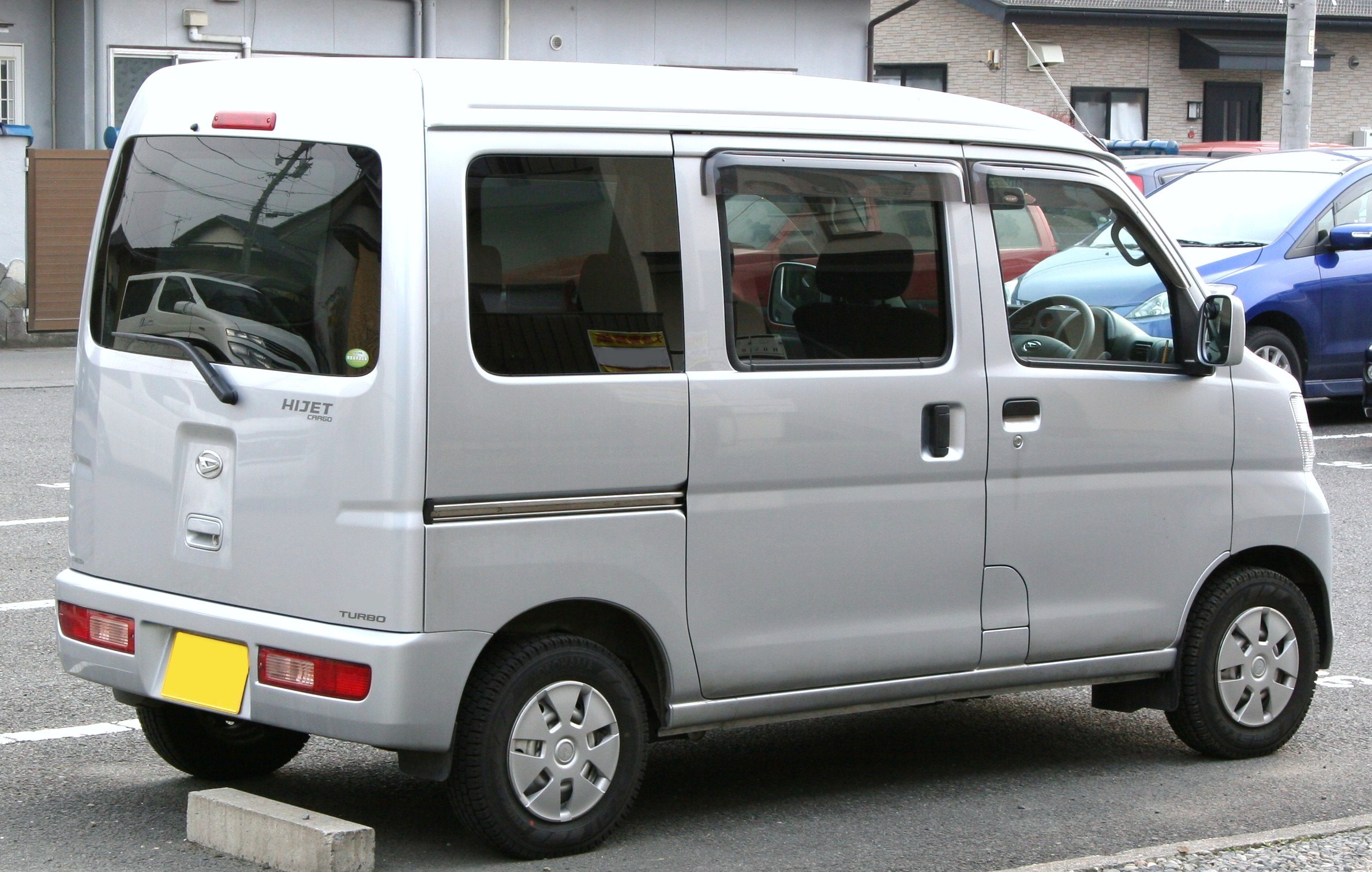
The well-equipped Hijet Cargo Cruise (S331V)

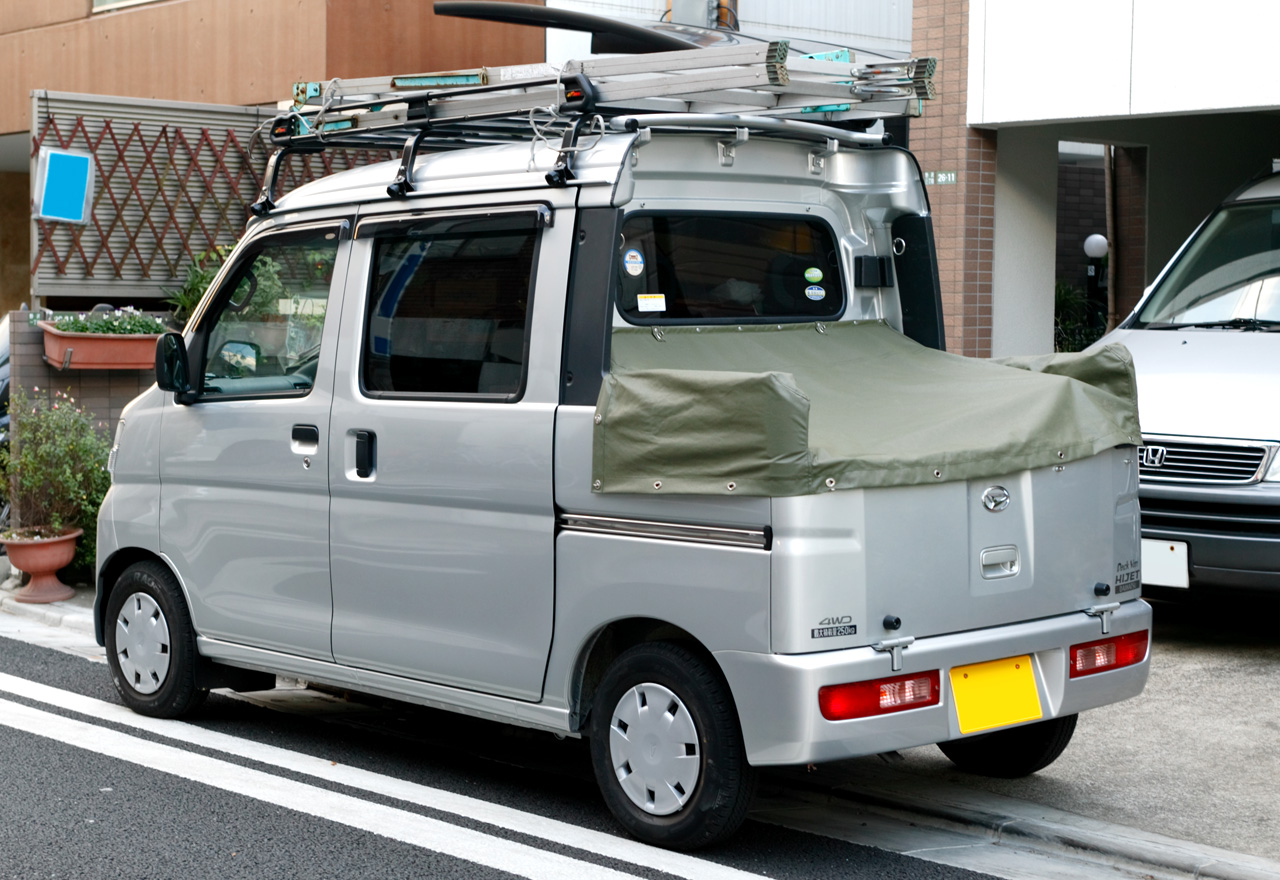
The Hijet Deck Van G, a version with a truck bed (S330W)

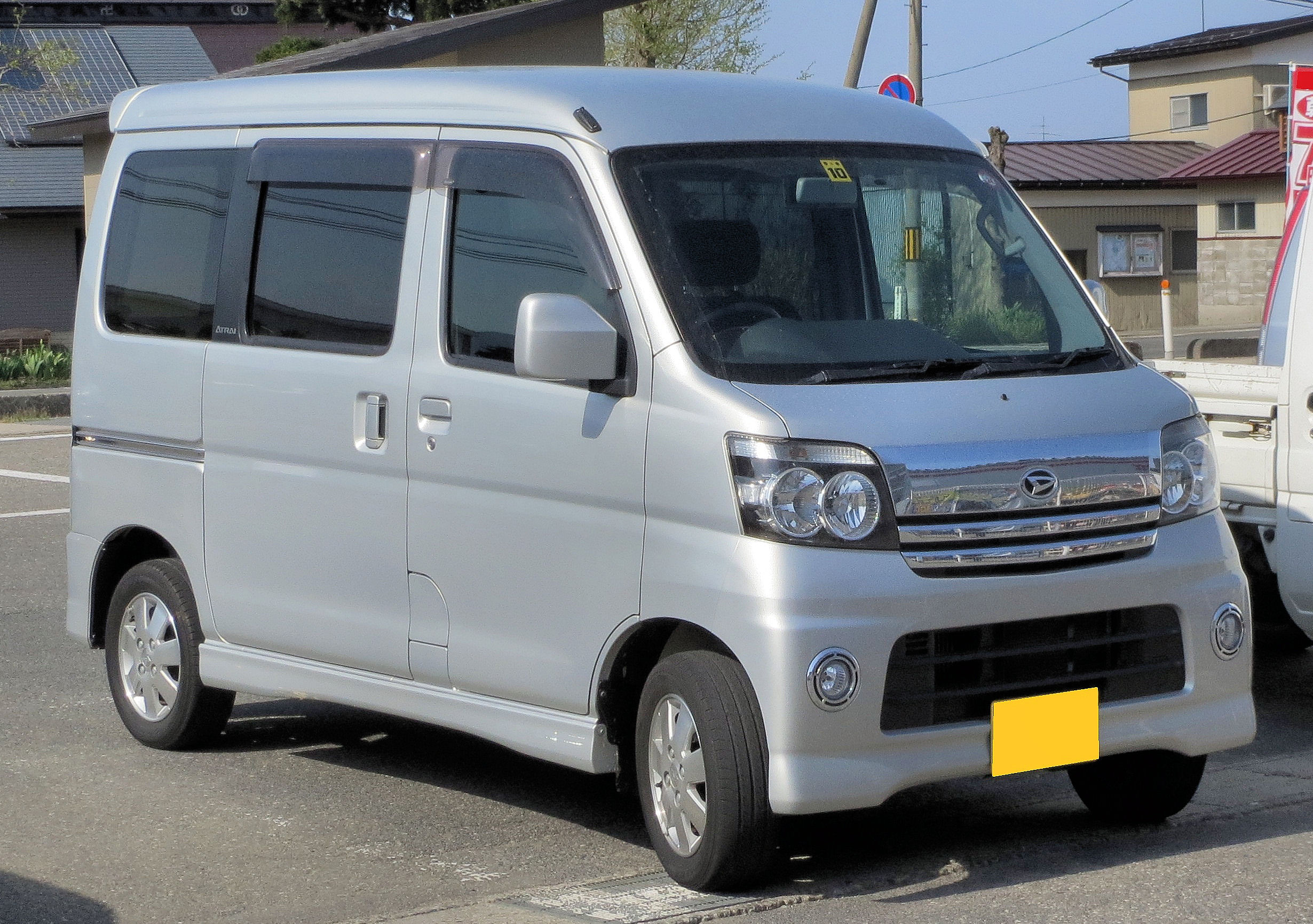
The pre-facelift model (2005-2007) Atrai Wagon Custom Turbo RS (S330G)

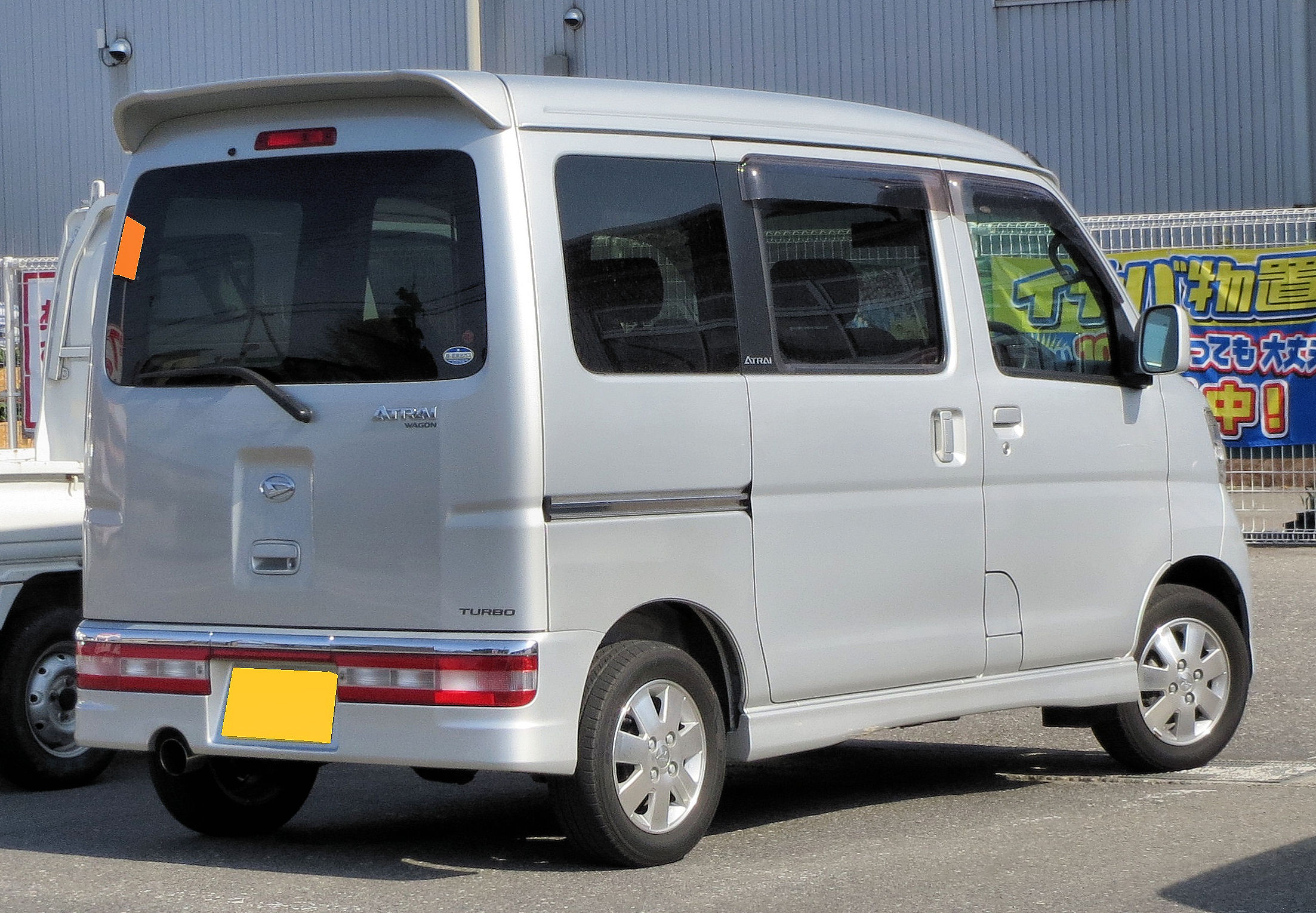
The pre-facelift model (2005-2007) Atrai Wagon Custom Turbo RS (S330G)

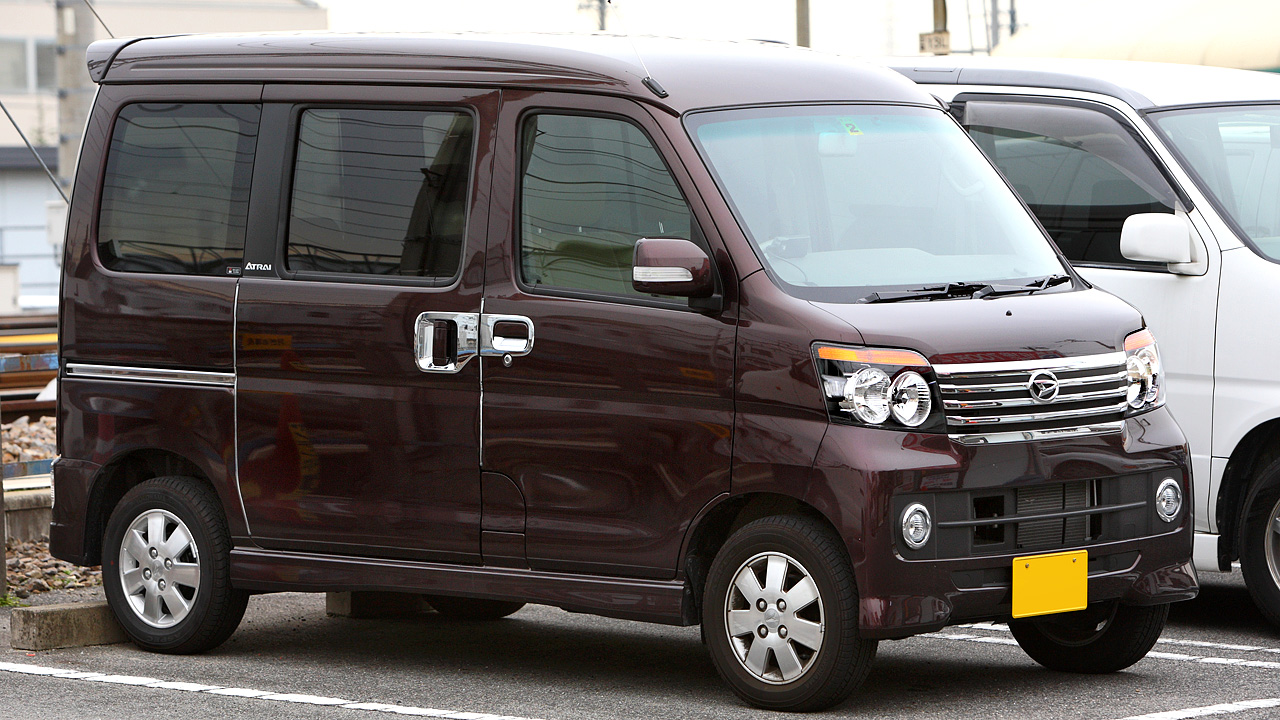
The first facelift model (2007-2017) Atrai Wagon Custom Turbo RS Limited

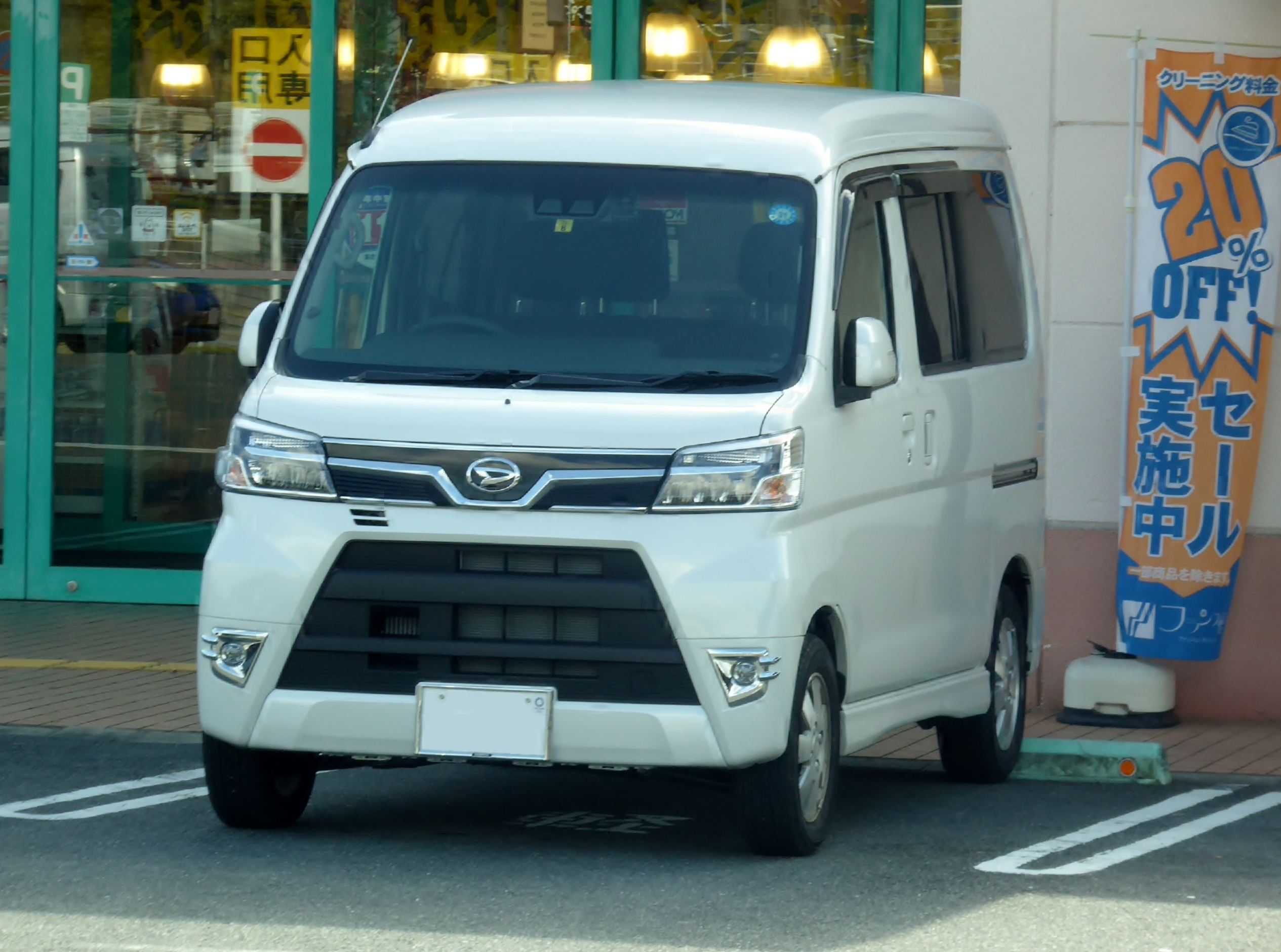
The second facelift model (2017 forward) Atrai Wagon Custom Turbo RS Limited SA III (S321G)

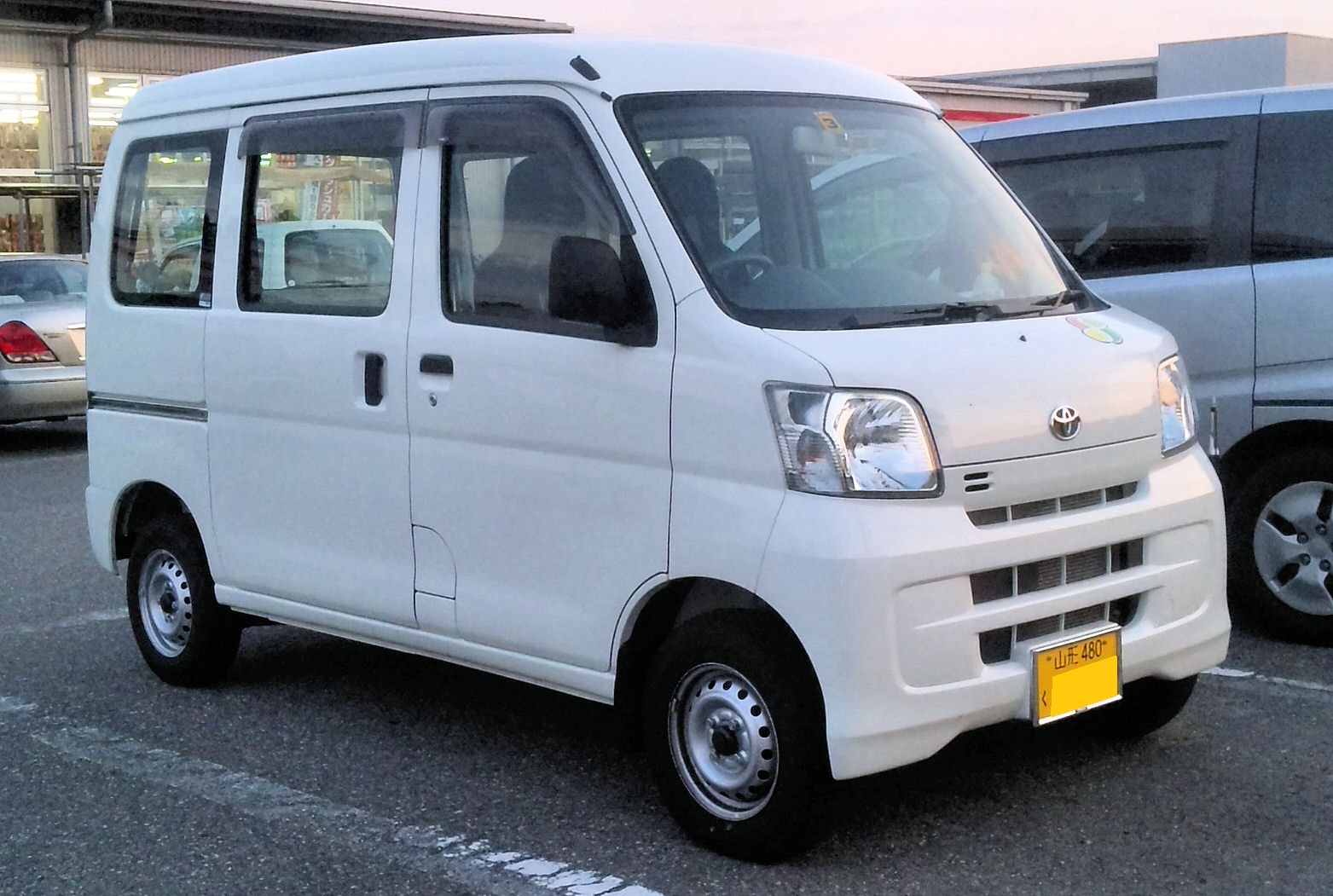
Toyota Pixis Van (Pre-Facelift)

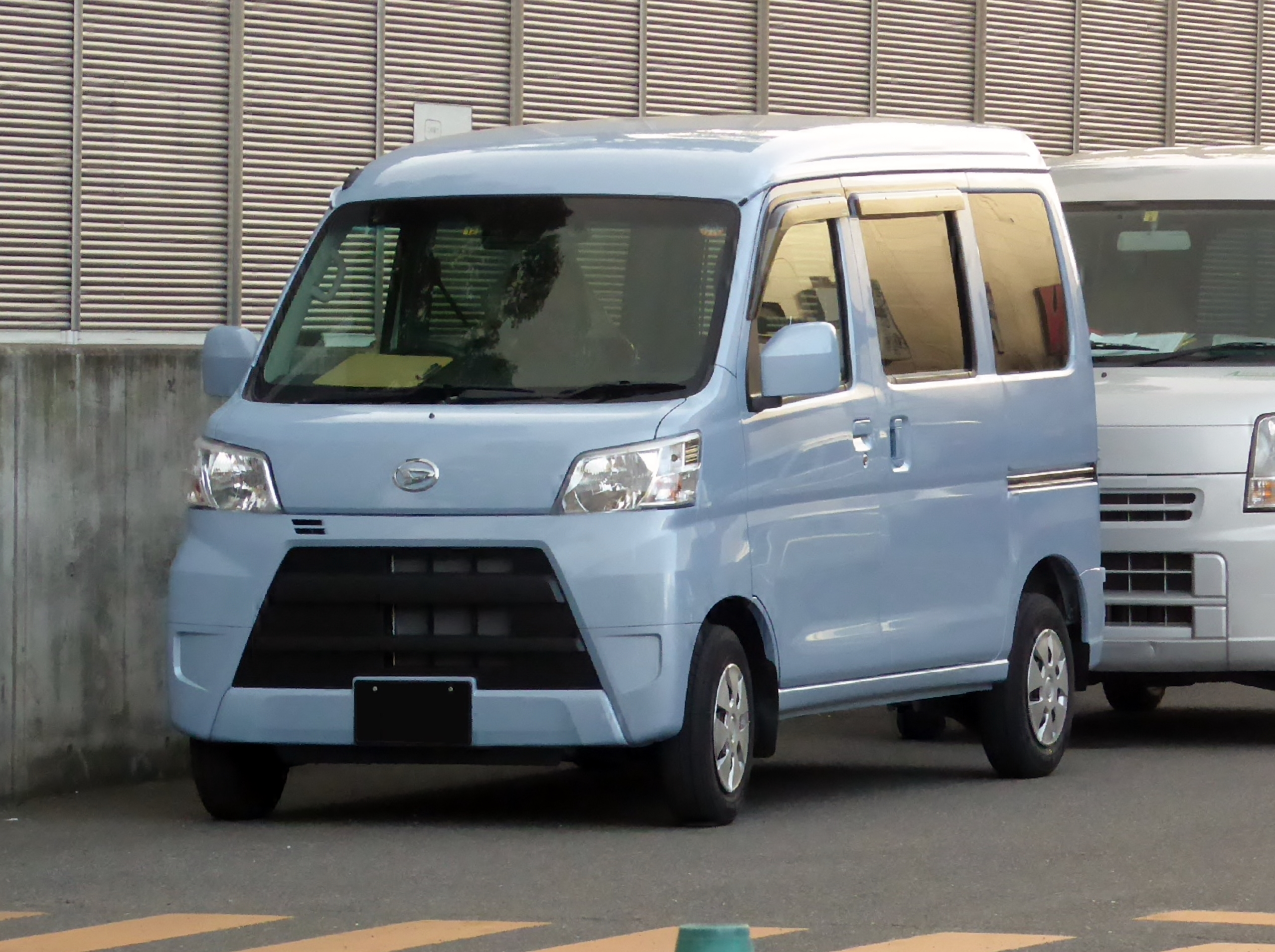
The 2017 facelift version of the Hijet Cargo, here a Cruise Turbo SA III (S321V)

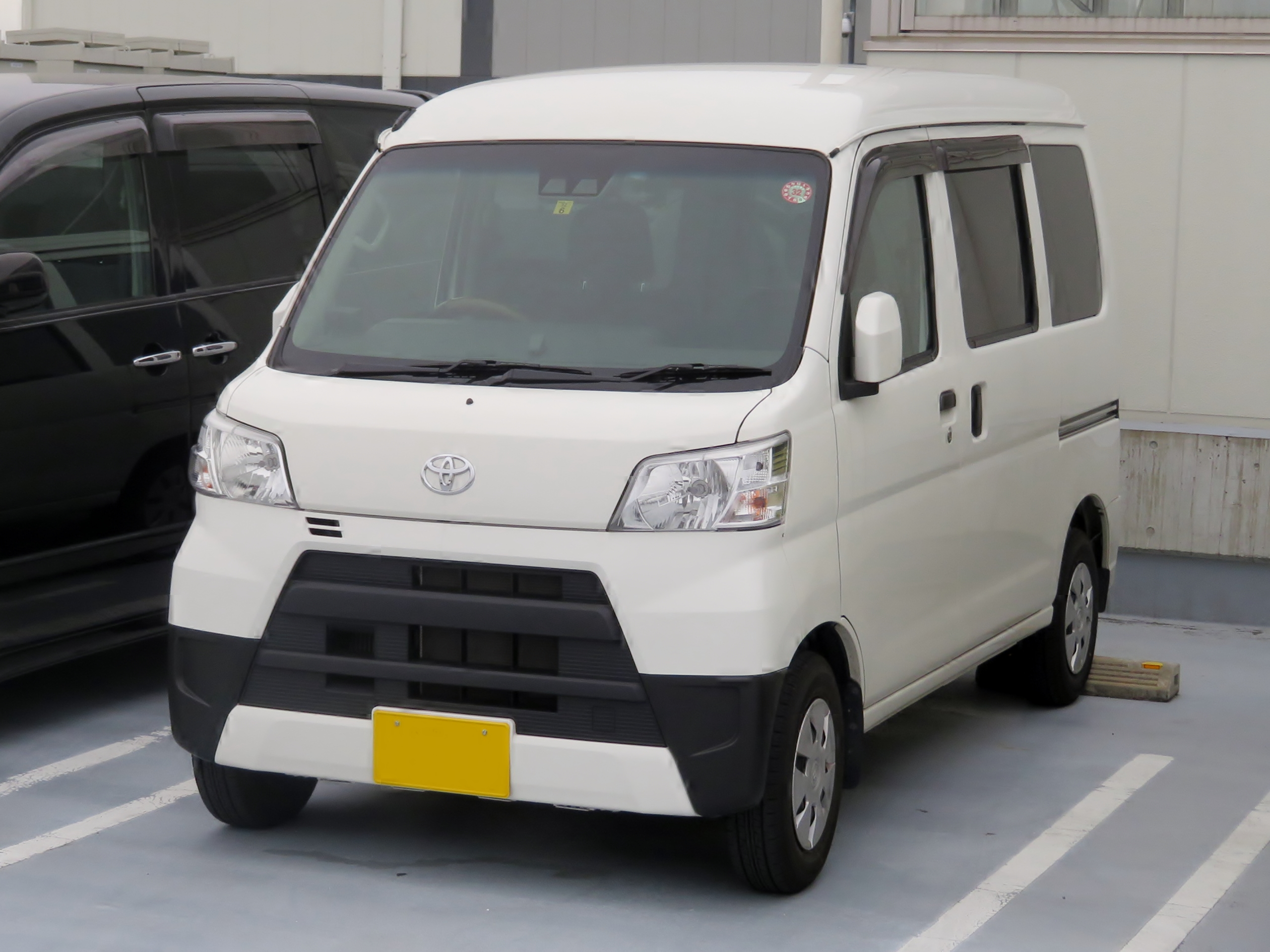
Toyota Pixis Van Cruise "SA III" (S321M)

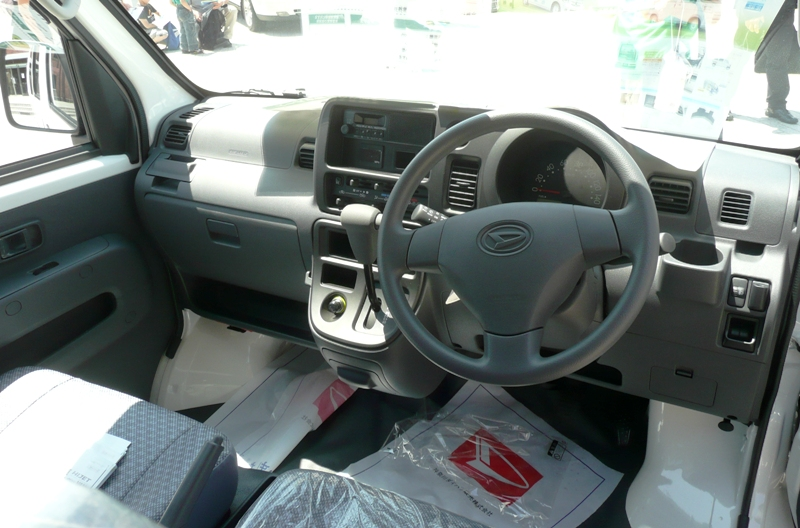
Interior

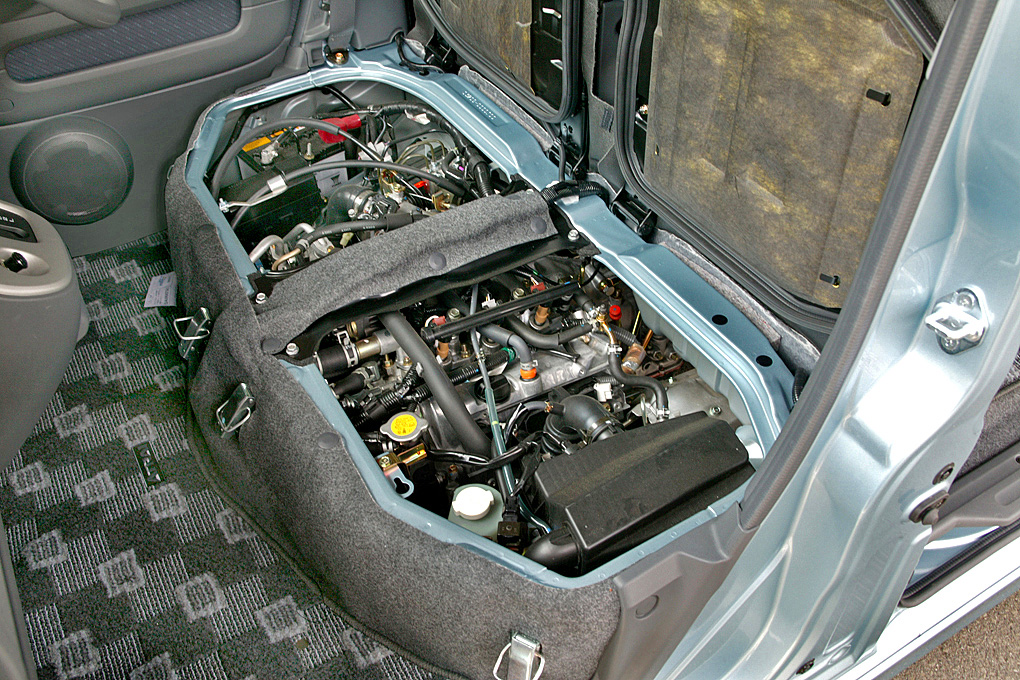
The turbocharged EF-DET engine beneath the driver's seat in a 2004-2007 Atrai (S320G)

=== Hijet Truck (S500, S510) ===
Hijet Truck (S500, S510)
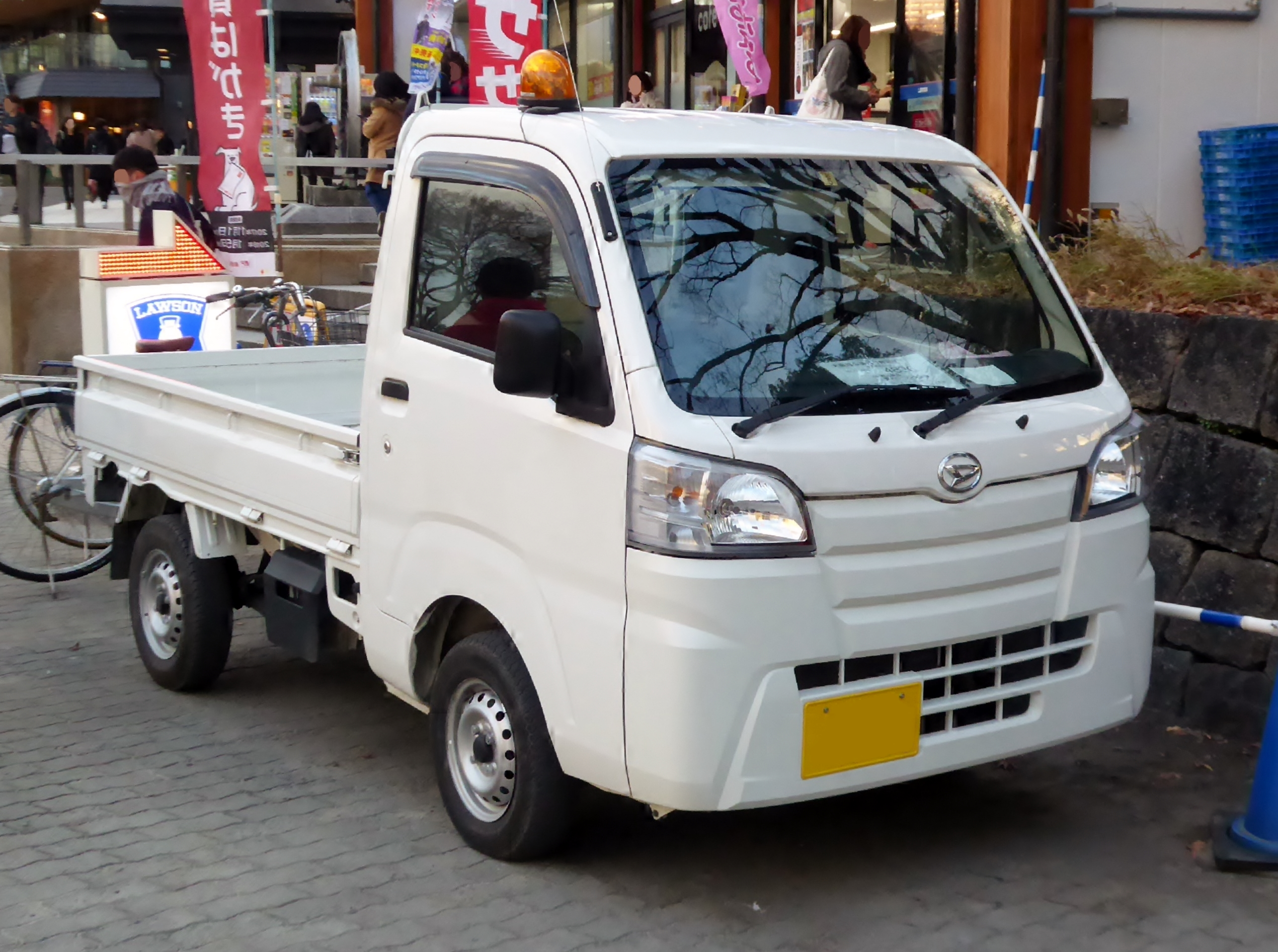
- Daihatsu Hijet Truck High-Roof (S500P)

Overview
- Also called: Daihatsu Hi-Max (Indonesia); Subaru Sambar Truck; Toyota Pixis Truck; Scion KEI-01 (North America, Hijet Jumbo)
- Production: September 2014 – present; November 2016 – November 2019 (Hi-Max)
- Assembly: Japan: Nakatsu, Ōita (Daihatsu Auto Body/Daihatsu Motor Kyushu); Indonesia: Sunter, North Jakarta (Astra Daihatsu Motor - Sunter Assembly Plant, Hi-Max); United States: Princeton, Indiana (TMMI)
- Designer: Manabu Fukuda, Masahisa Nagano and Morinobu Okano (2014 Hijet Truck); Yoshihiko Sakurai and Yuji Kitagawa (2021 facelift Hijet Truck)

Body and chassis
- Class: Kei truck (Japan); Light commercial vehicle (Hi-Max); Low-speed vehicle (KEI-01)
- Body style: 2-door pickup
- Layout: Front mid-engine, rear-wheel-drive or all-wheel drive (Japan and KEI-01)

Powertrain
- Engine: Gasoline: 658 cc KF-VE I3; 998 cc 1KR-DE I3 (Hi-Max)
- Transmission: 5-speed manual 4-speed automatic CVT (2021–present)

Dimensions
- Wheelbase: 1,900 mm (74.8 in)
- Length: 3,395 mm (133.7 in)
- Width: 1,475 mm (58.1 in)
- Height: Hijet Truck: 1,780–1,885 mm (70.1–74.2 in); Hi-Max: 1,770 mm (69.7 in)

In September 2014, the tenth generation Hijet cabover trucks was introduced, replacing the S200 line which had remained in production for a full fifteen years. The Truck is mid-engined as before, with either rear-wheel drive or optional four-wheel drive (S510). Unlike the ninth generation Hijet Truck, chassis codes end with a "P" for trucks as well as box van versions. As with the S201 predecessor, they have the new KF engine of 660 cc.

In December 2021, the CVT option was introduced for the Hijet Truck.

In November 2026, Toyota announced a rebadged variant of the Hijet Jumbo truck for the North American market under its revived Scion brand as the KEI-01. It will be classified as a low-speed vehicle (LSV), limited to a top speed of 25 mph (40 km/h) and restricted to roads with a speed limit of 35 mph (56 km/h) or less. It will initially only be available to fleet or commercial buyers, but Toyota is considering adding retail sales.

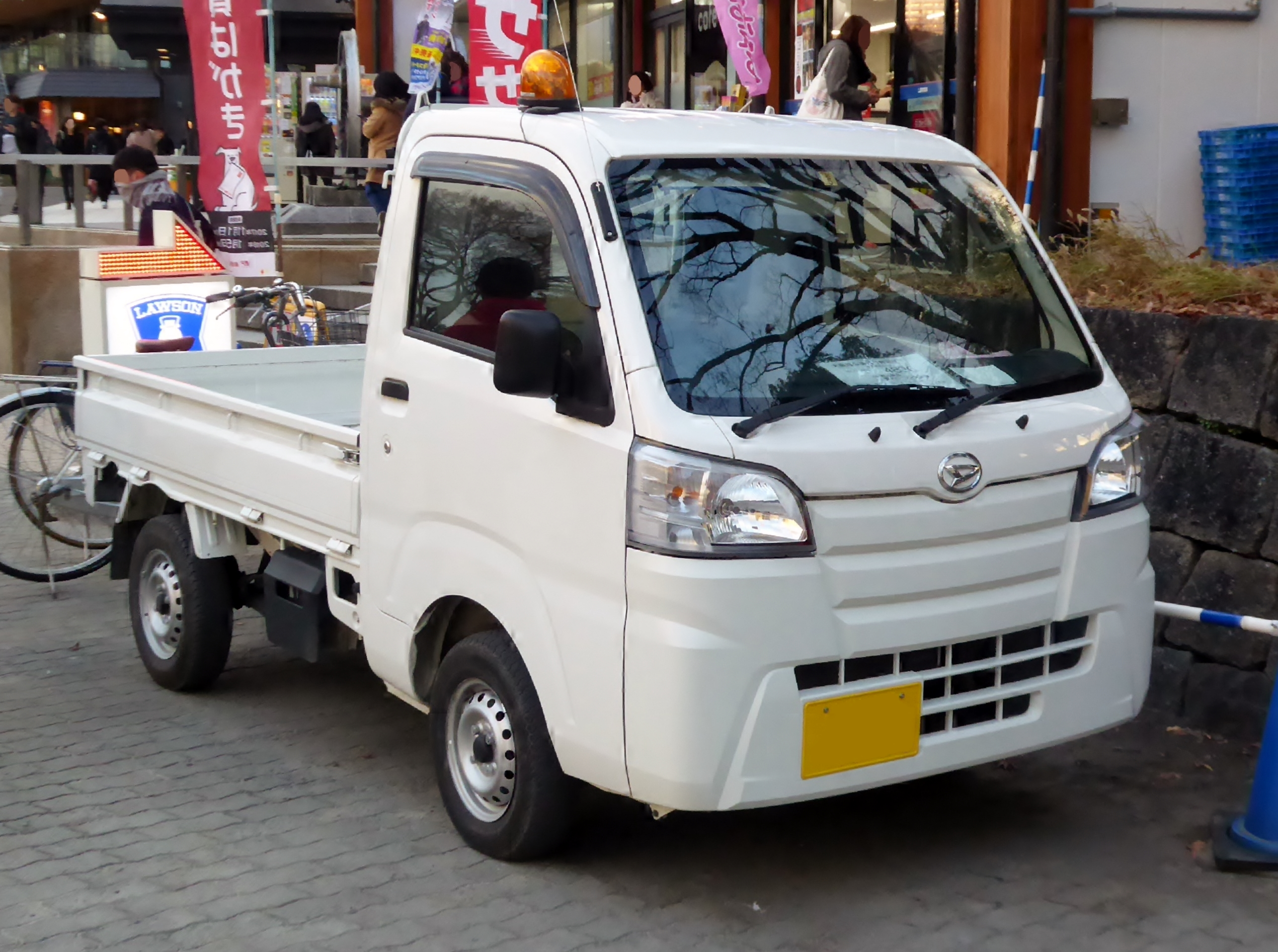
Tenth generation Daihatsu Hijet Truck High-Roof (S500P)

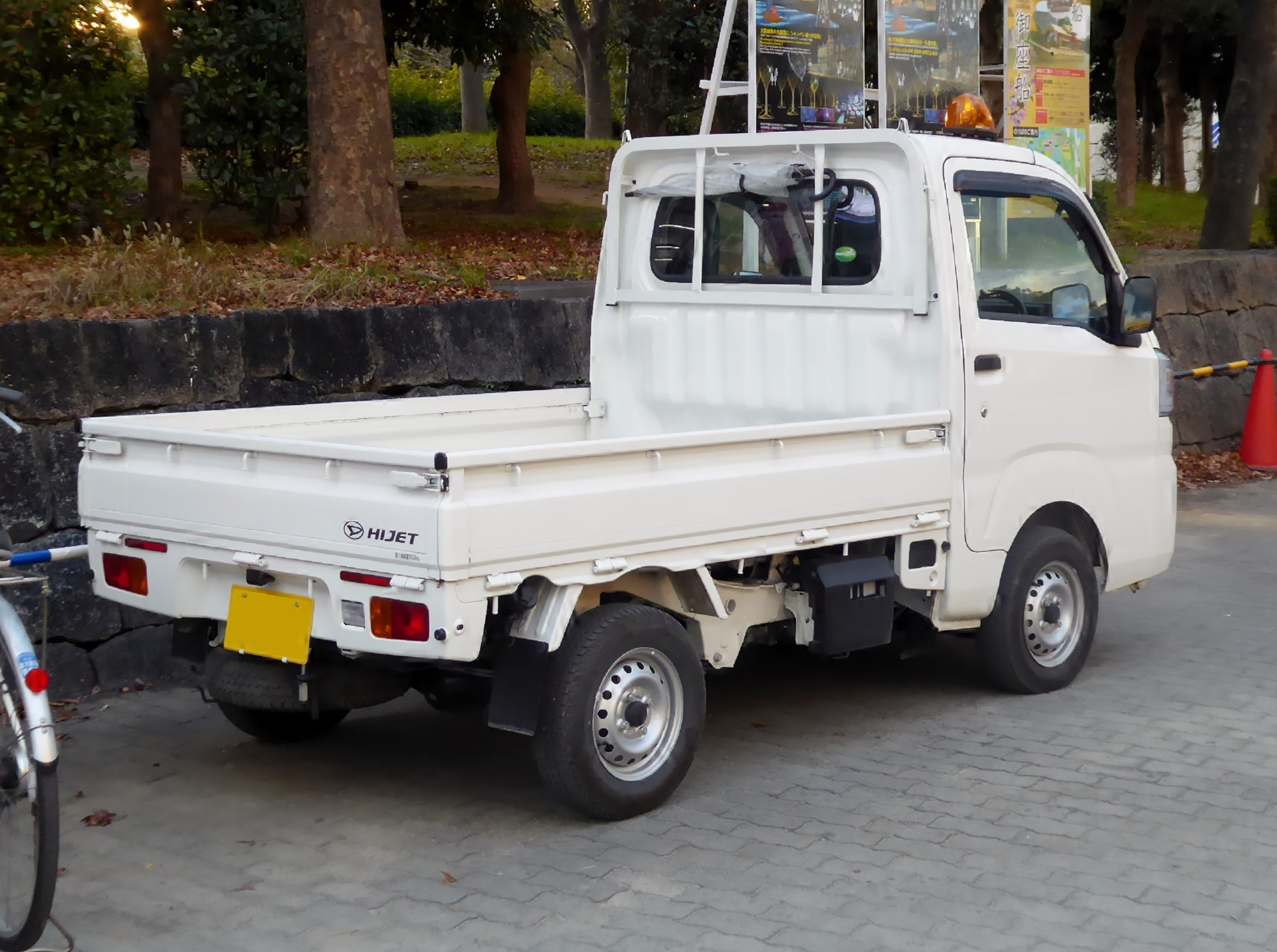
Rear view (S500P)

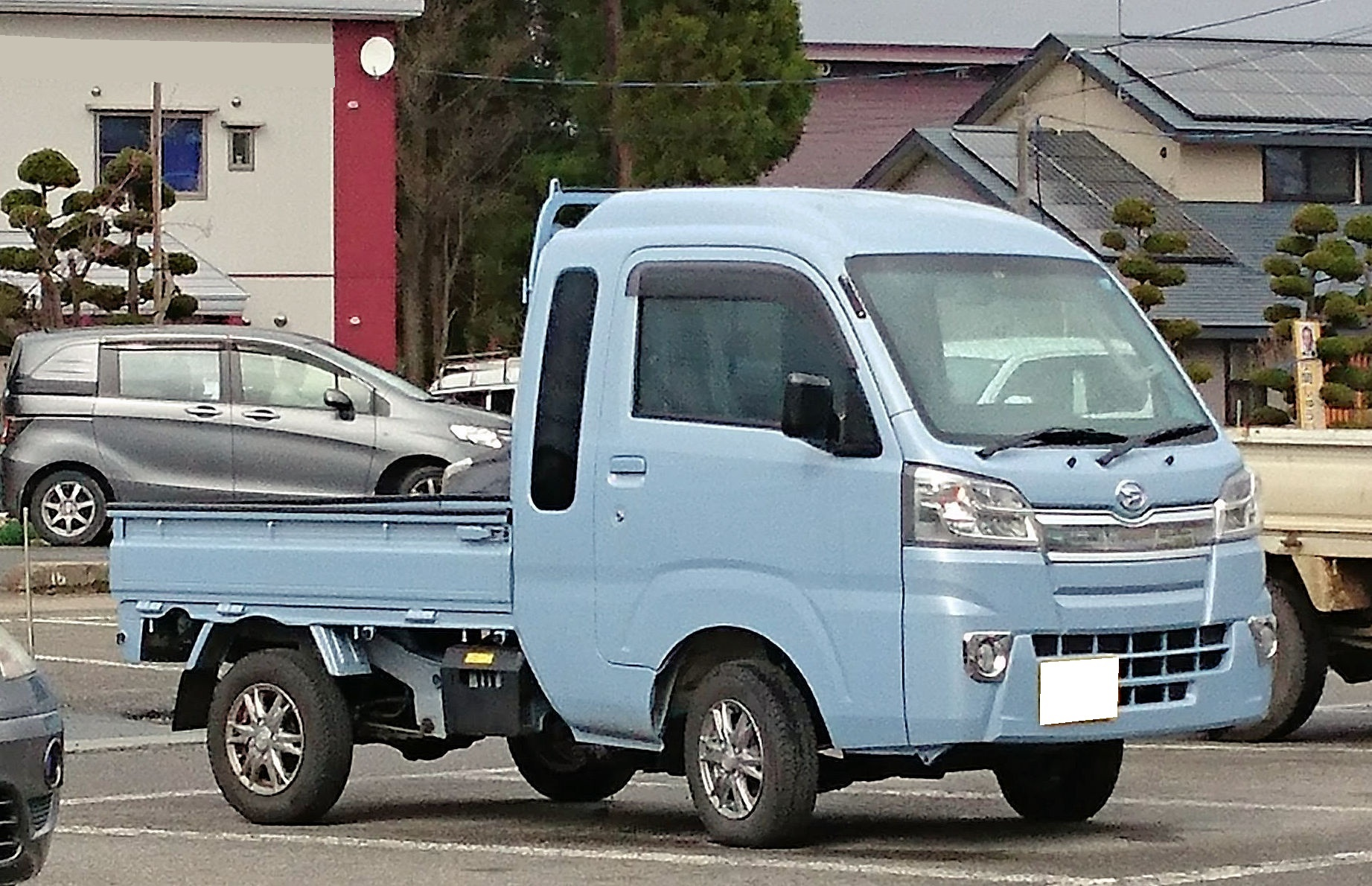
2014–2021 Hijet Jumbo

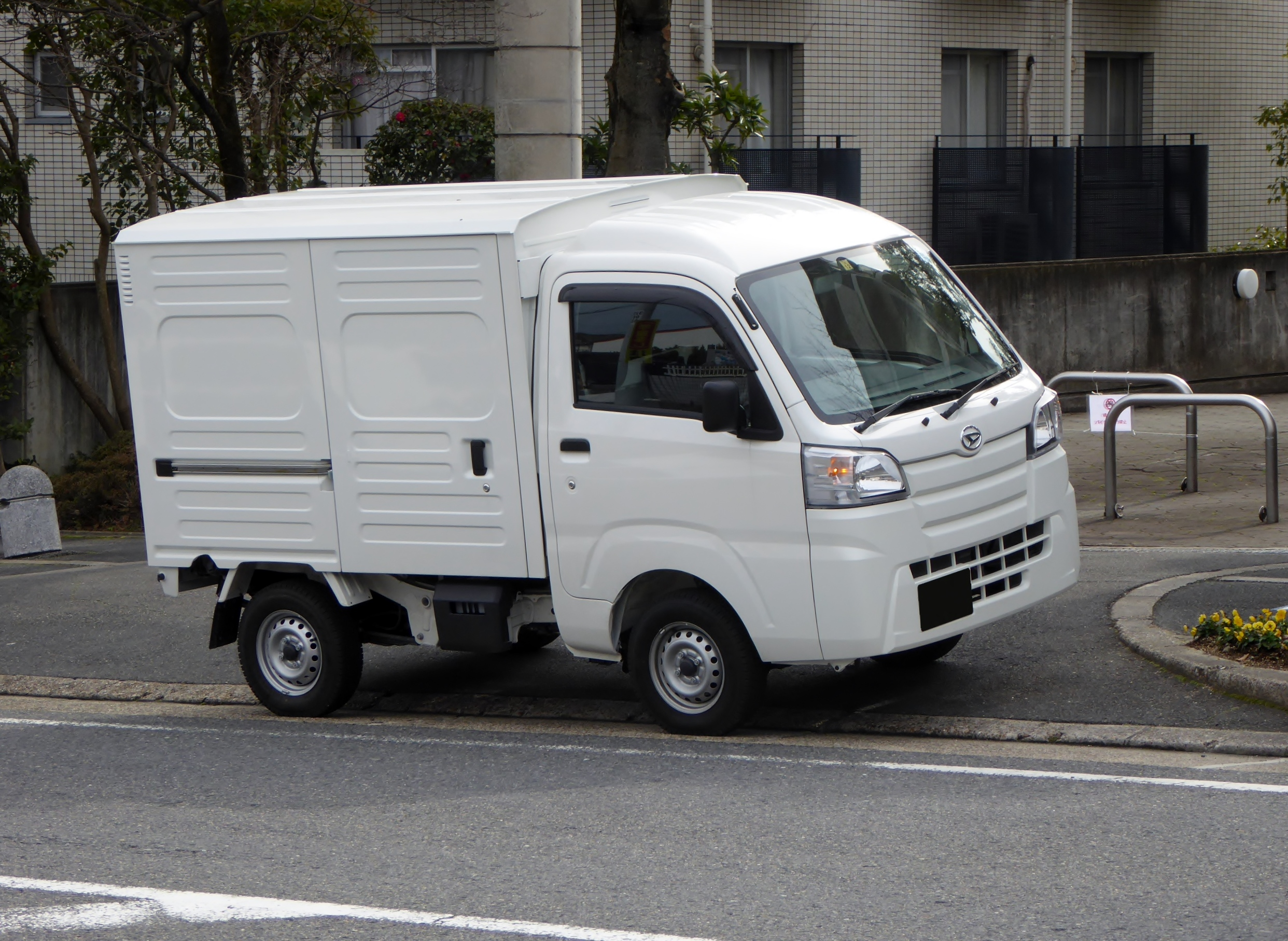
Hijet Truck freezer

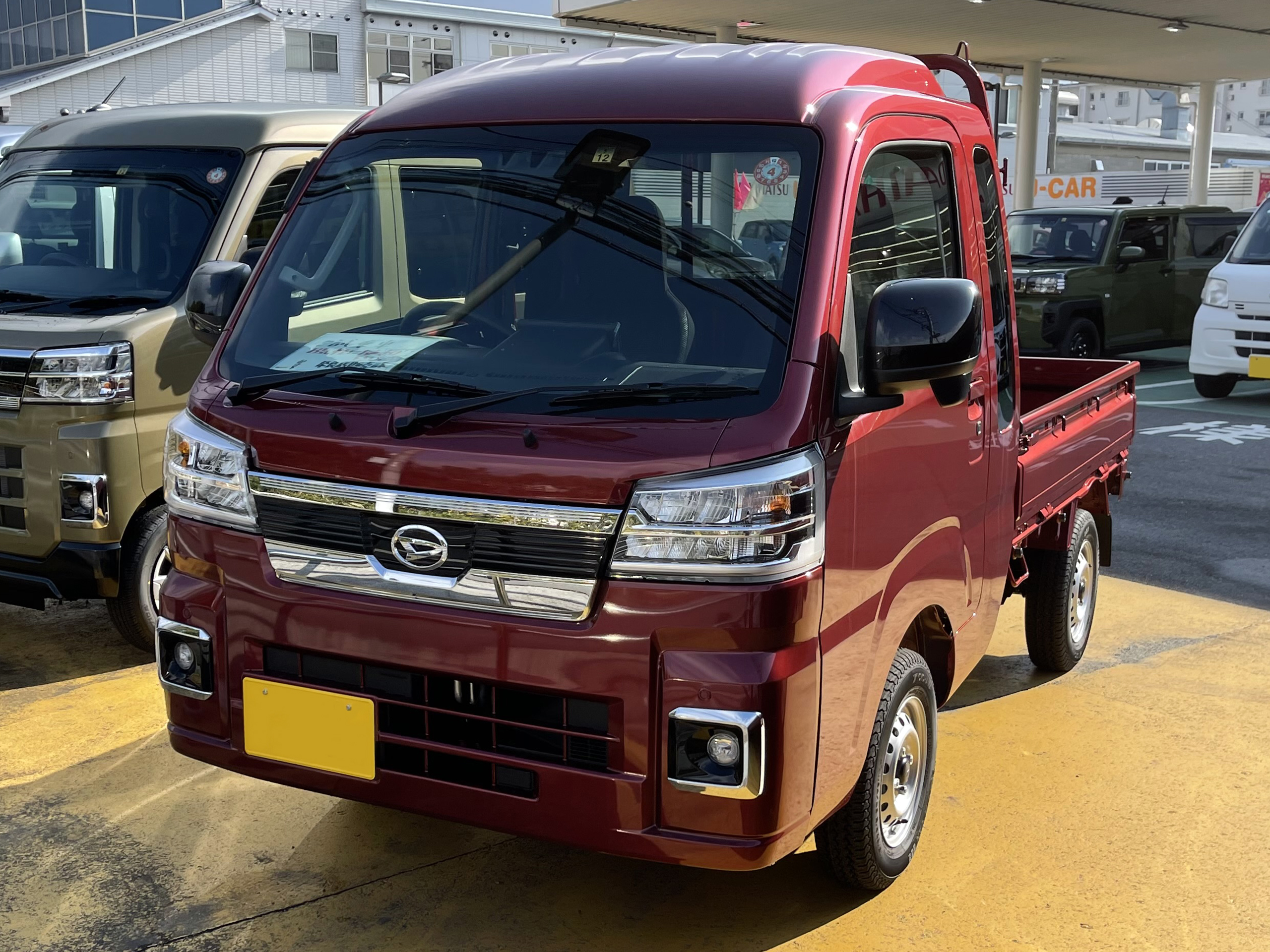
2021 Hijet Jumbo

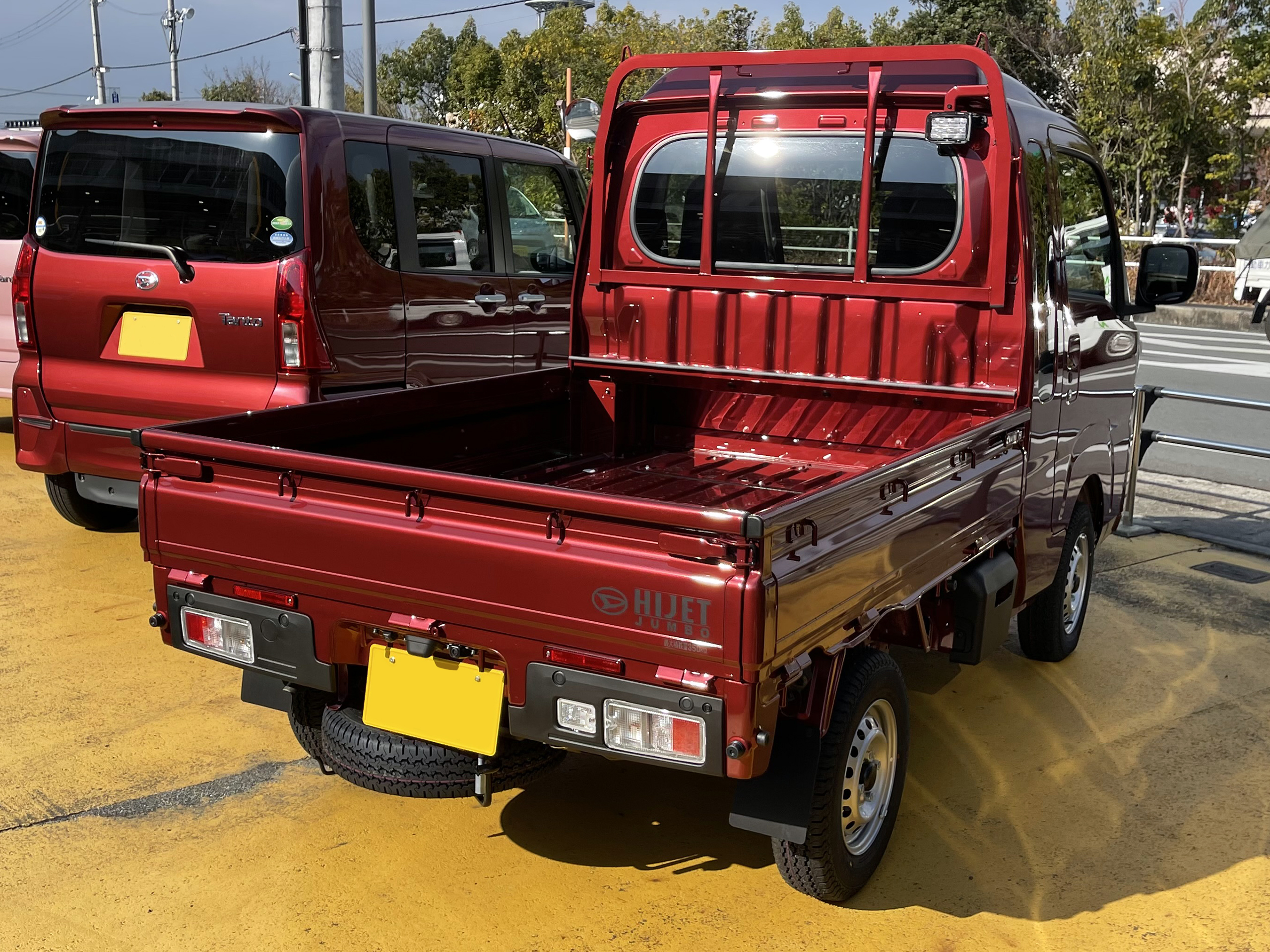
2021 Hijet Jumbo

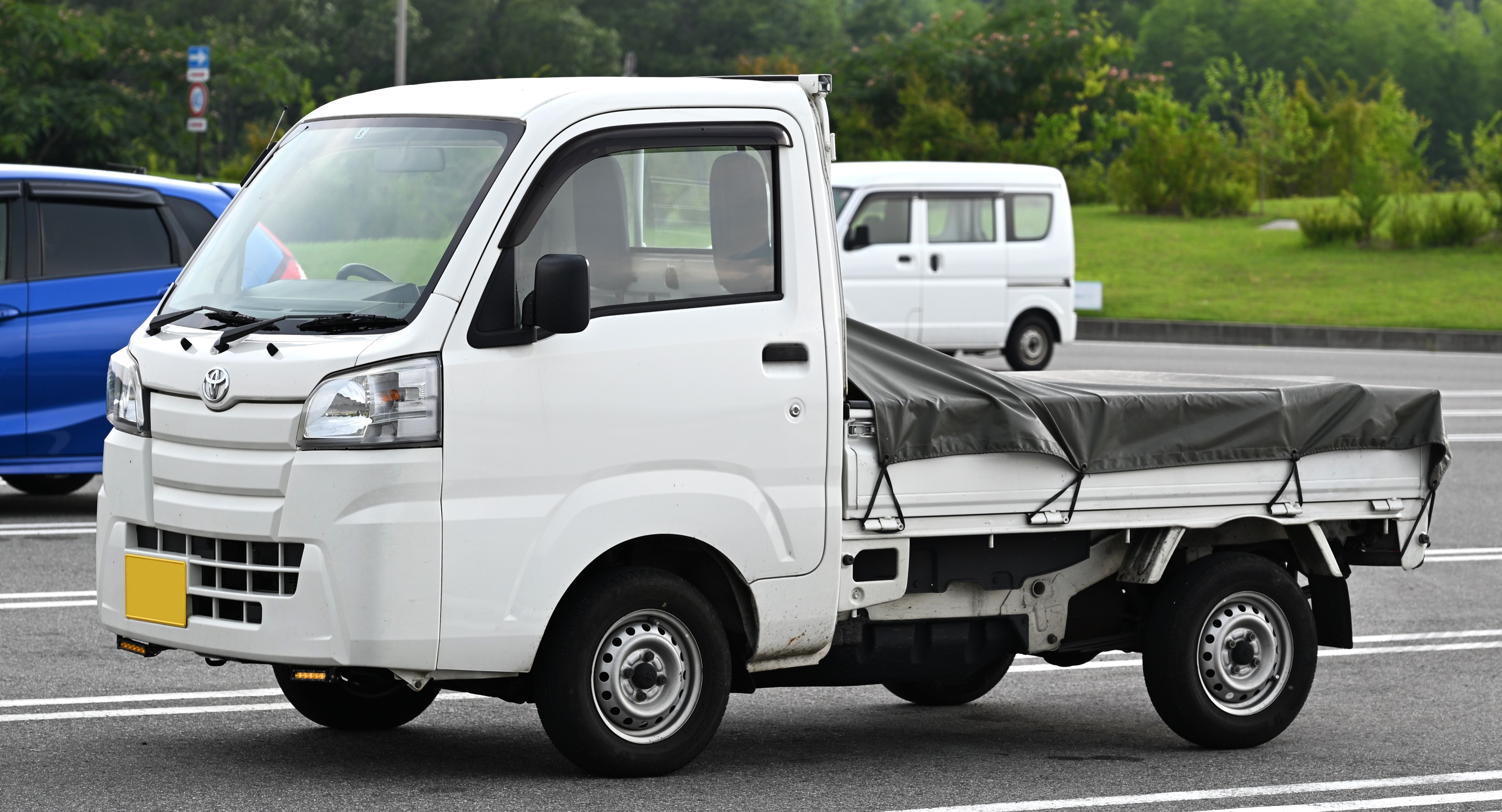
Toyota Pixis Truck (Pre-Facelift)

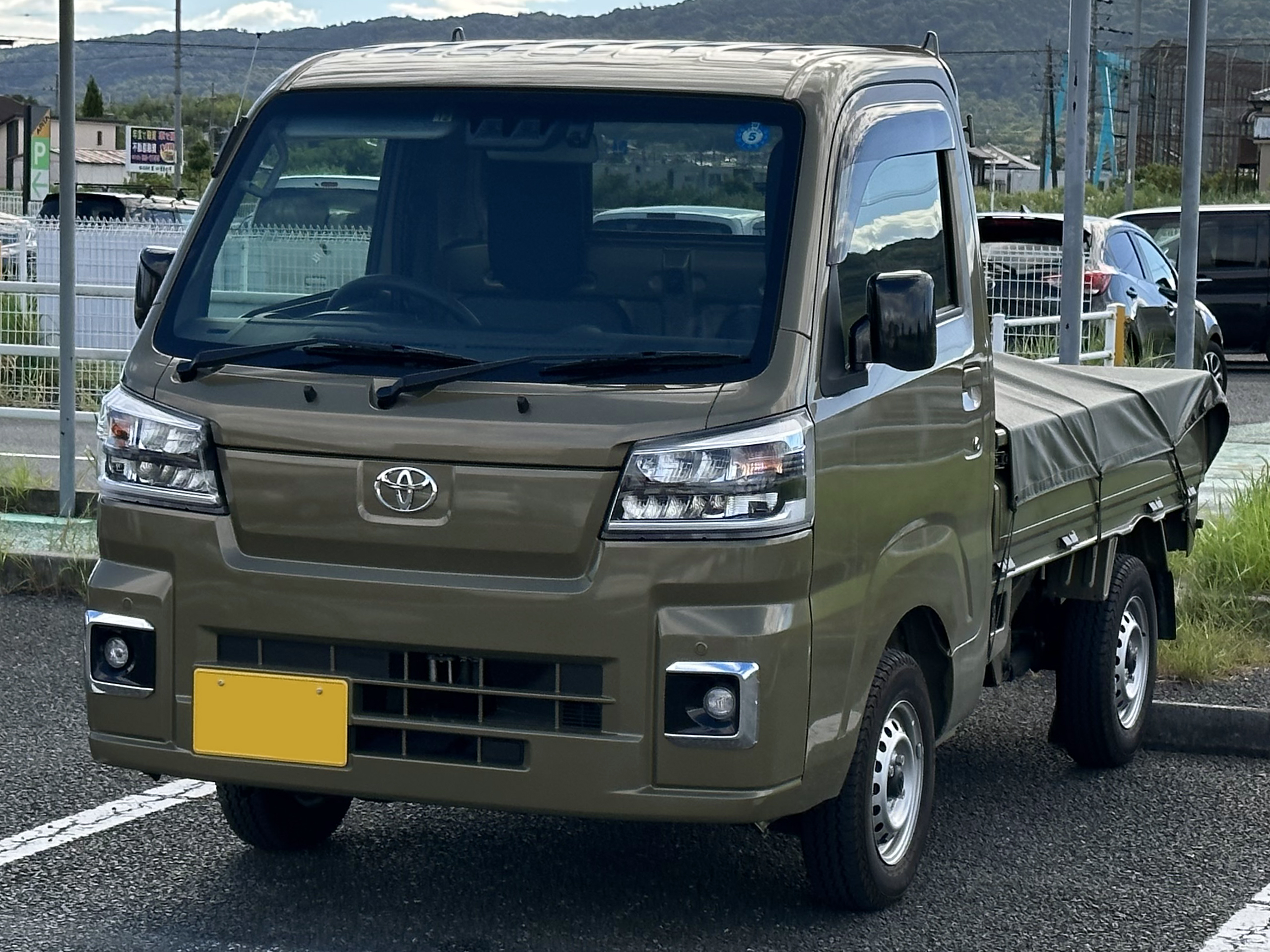
Toyota Pixis Truck (Facelift)

==== Hi-Max (S501) ====
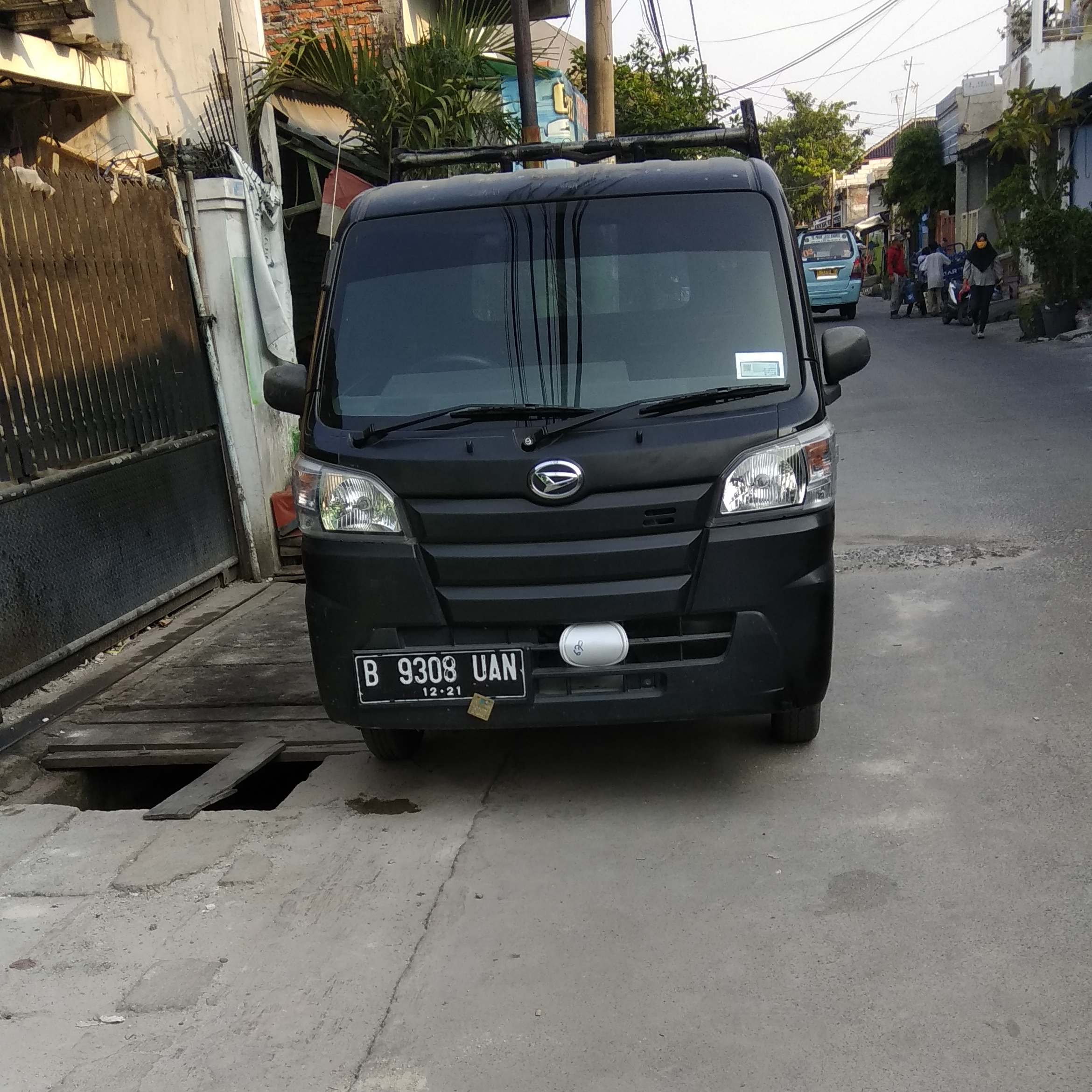
2016 Daihatsu Hi-Max 1.0 (S501RP, Indonesia)

The tenth generation Hijet Truck was launched in Indonesia as the Daihatsu Hi-Max on 10 November 2016. Unlike the Japanese market Hijet in the restricted kei class, it used the 998 cc 1KR-DE engine, the same engine used in Ayla hatchback but producing less power and torque at 42 kW (57 PS; 56 hp) at 5,000 rpm and 85 N⋅m (63 lb⋅ft) at 4,000 rpm. The Hi-Max has the S501RP chassis number and was assembled at Astra Daihatsu Motor's Sunter plant. It stopped production in November 2019 and was removed from Daihatsu's Indonesian website in April 2020 due to low sales caused by buyers' preference for larger models such as the Gran Max or the Indonesian-built Suzuki Carry. In 2019, only 95 units of Hi-Max were sent to dealerships, compared to nearly 36,000 units of the Gran Max. A total of 1,731 units were sold.

== Eleventh generation (S700, S710) ==
Eleventh generation (S700, S710)
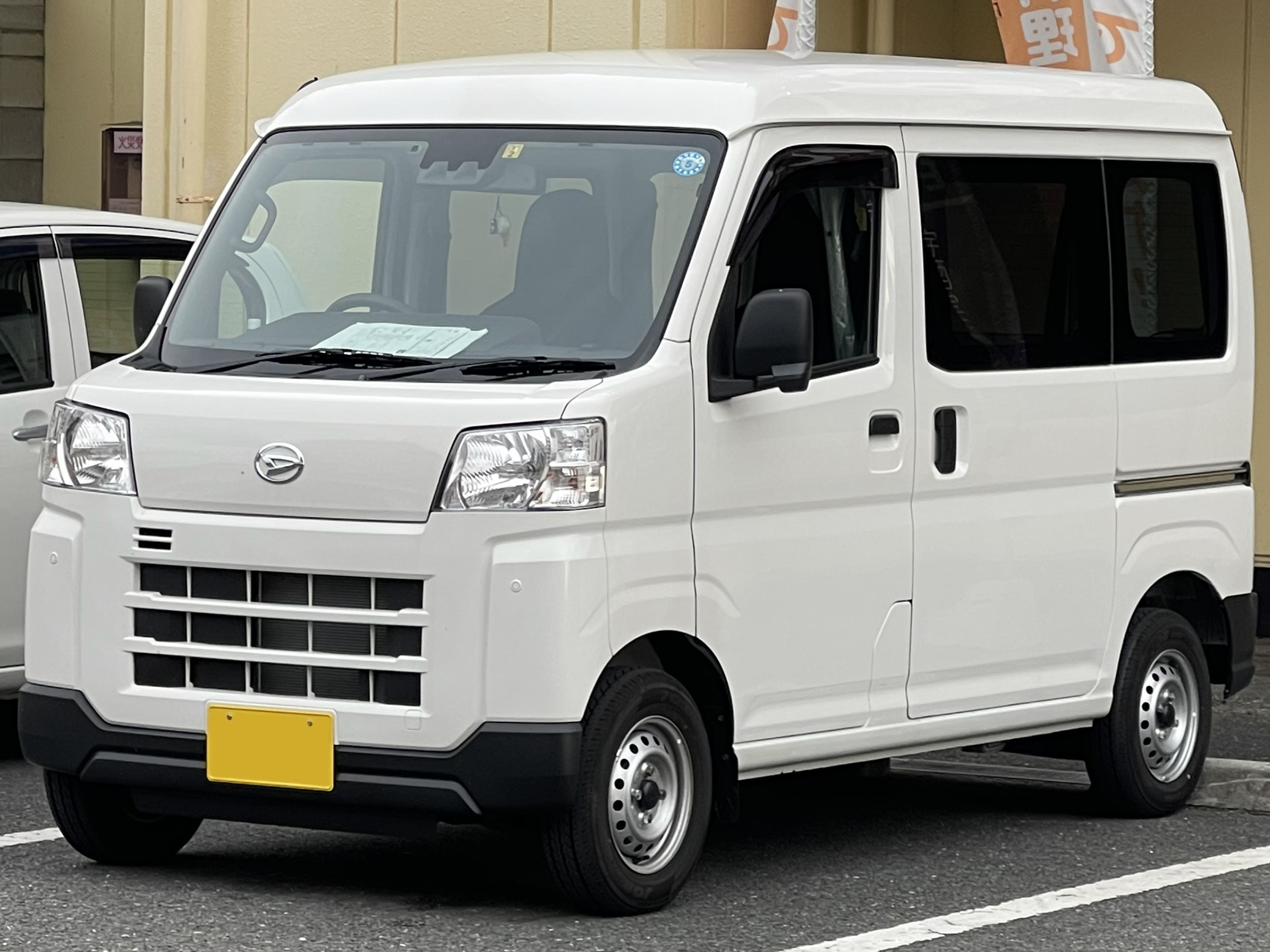
- 2022 Hijet Cargo Deluxe (S700V)

Overview
- Also called: Daihatsu Atrai (passenger van); Toyota Pixis Van; Subaru Sambar Van; Subaru Sambar Dias (passenger van); Suzuki e Every (electric van)
- Production: December 2021 – present (van)
- Assembly: Japan: Nakatsu, Ōita (Daihatsu Motor Kyushu)
- Designer: Eiji Murakami and Toshiatsu Kinoshita (van); Yukinobu Morioka (Deck Van)

Body and chassis
- Class: Microvan
- Body style: 5-door van
- Layout: Front mid-engine, rear-wheel-drive or all-wheel drive Rear-motor, rear-wheel-drive (e-Hijet)
- Platform: Daihatsu New Global Architecture (DNGA)

Powertrain
- Engine: Gasoline: 658 cc KF-VE I3; 658 cc KF-DET turbo I3
- Electric motor: 30-kW 1CG AC synchronous motor
- Transmission: 5-speed manual CVT
- Battery: 36.6-kWh lithium-ion (e-Hijet)
- Electric range: 257 km (160 mi) (e-Hijet)
- Plug-in charging: 6 kW AC, 50 kW DC (e-Hijet)

Dimensions
- Wheelbase: 2,450 mm (96.5 in)
- Length: 3,395 mm (133.7 in)
- Width: 1,475 mm (58.1 in)
- Height: 1,890 mm (74.4 in) (Cargo)
- Curb weight: 870–1,020 kg (1,918–2,249 lb) (Cargo)

Chronology
- Predecessor: Daihatsu Hijet Caddie (indirect)

=== Hijet Cargo/Atrai (S700, S710) ===
The eleventh-generation Hijet Cargo/sixth-generation Atrai was introduced on 20 December 2021. It is based on the Daihatsu New Global Architecture. Atrai Deck, which was available as a special edition vehicle in the second generation, has been revived as the "Deck Van".

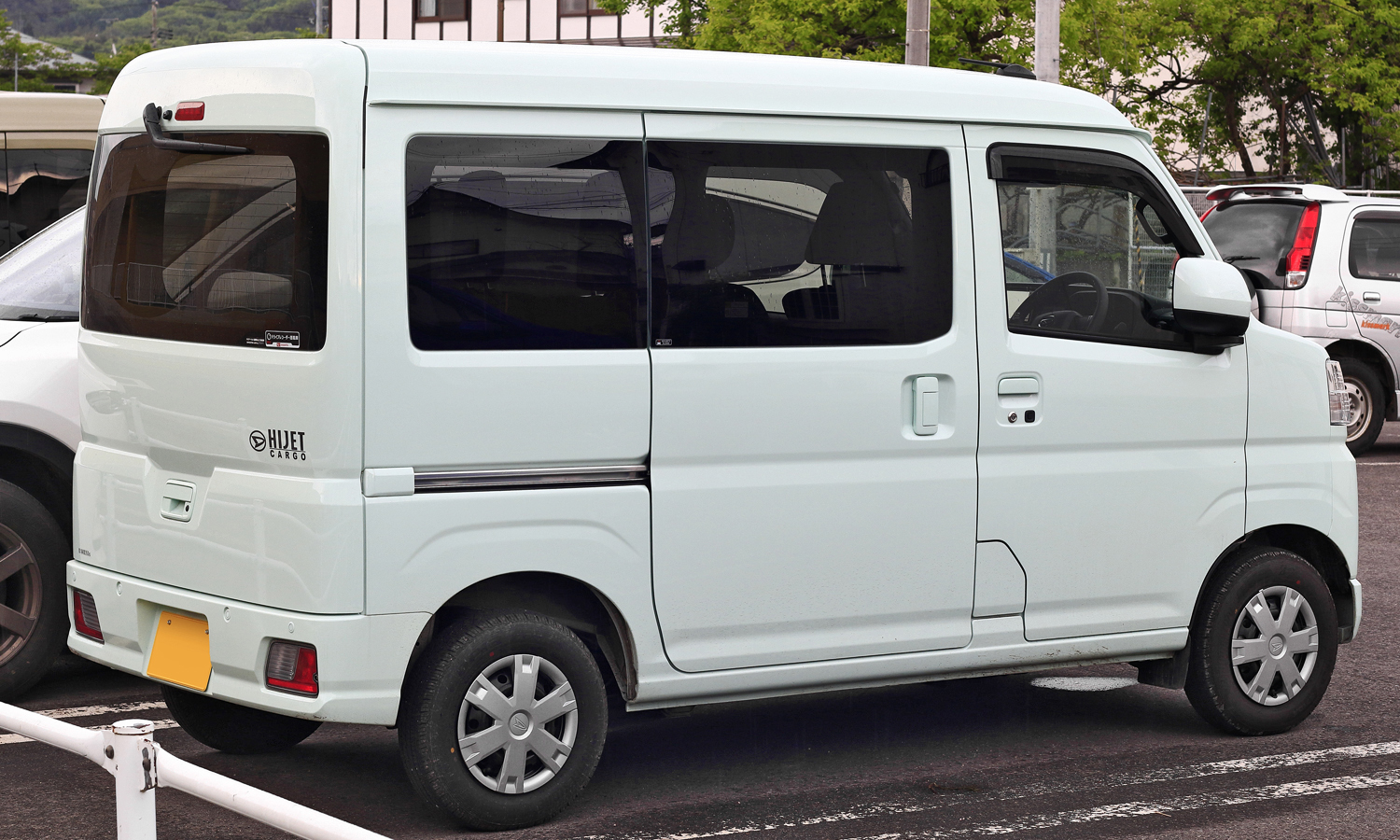
Rear view

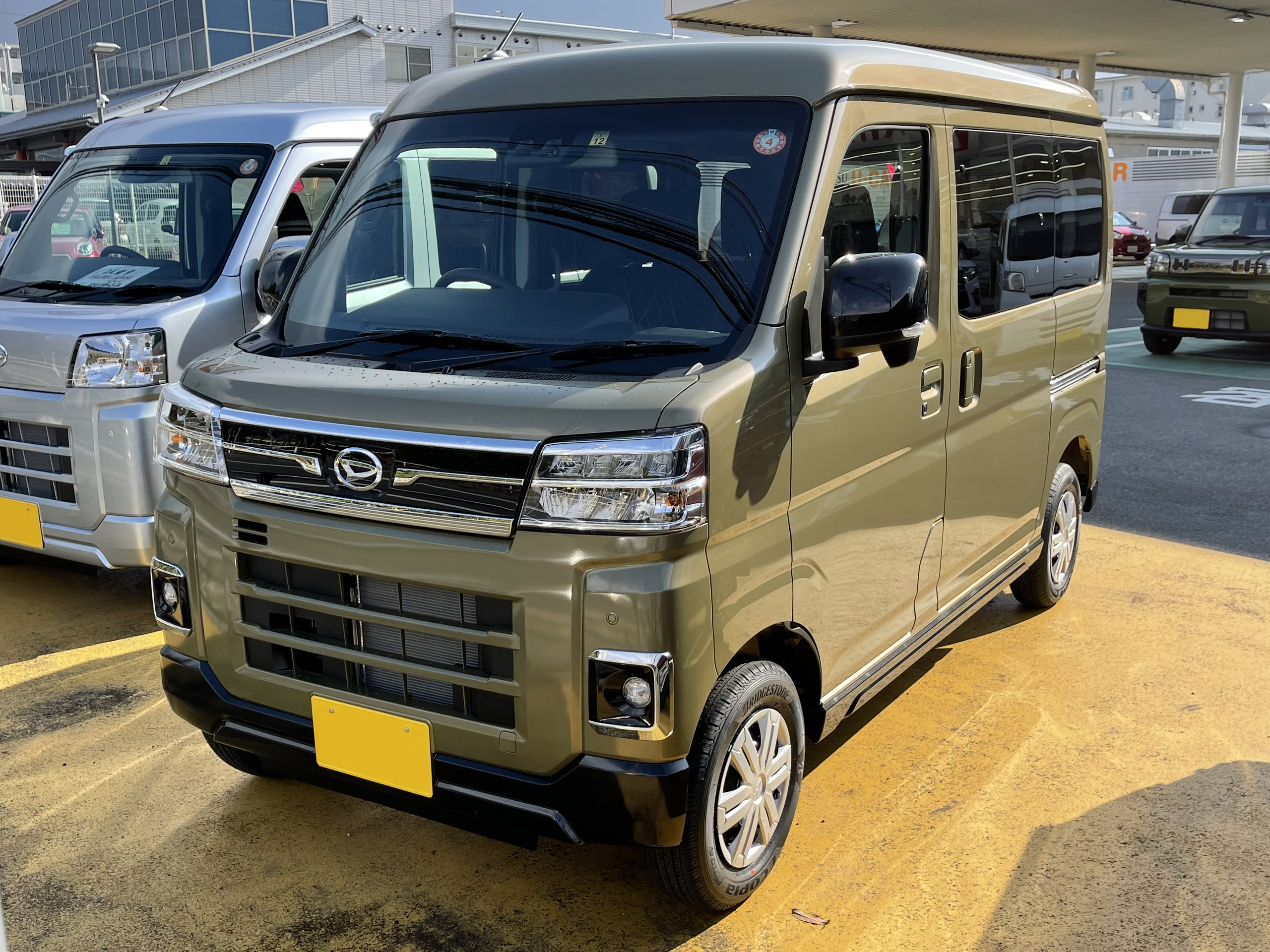
2021 Atrai RS (S700V)

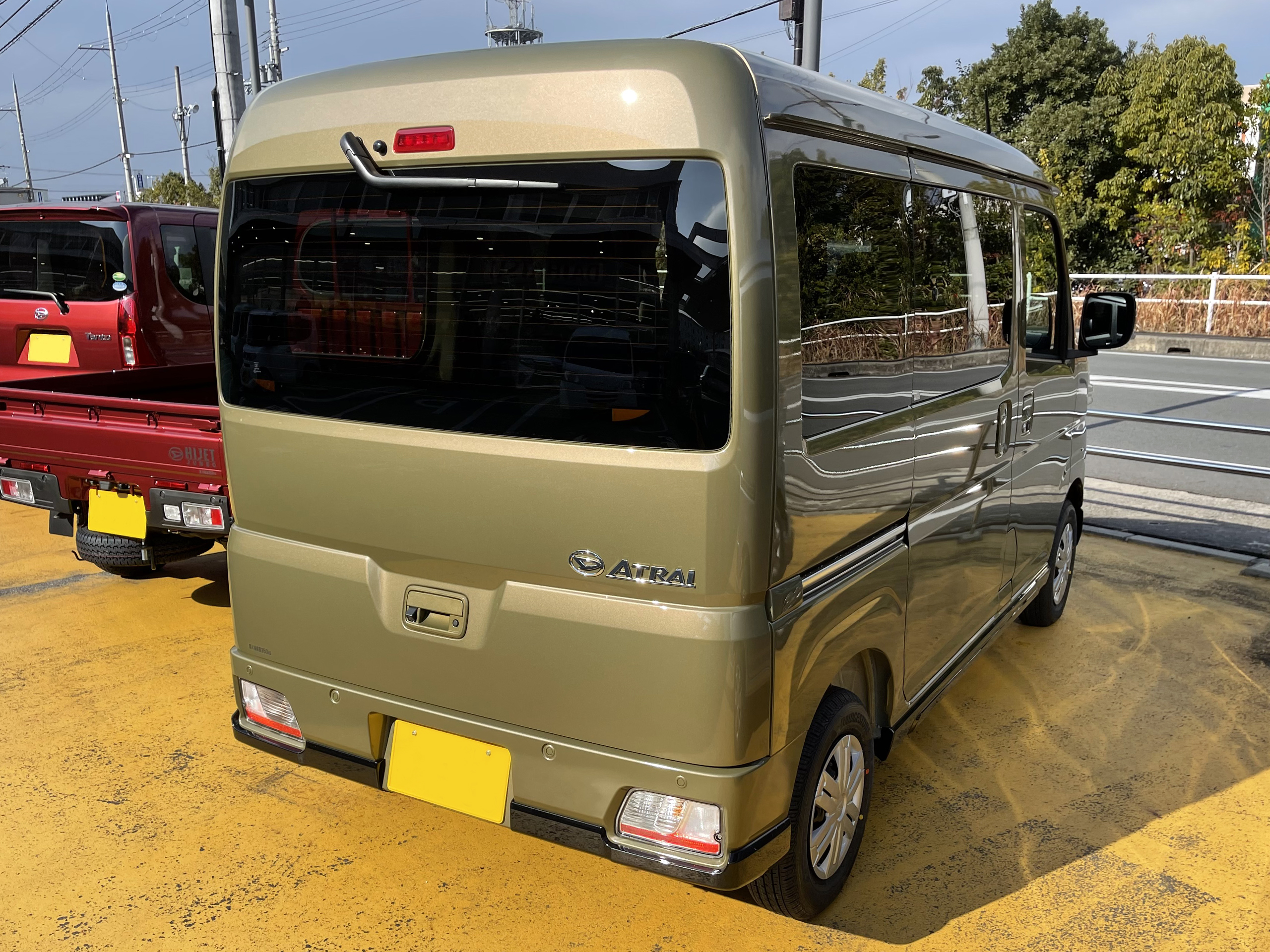
Atrai RS rear view

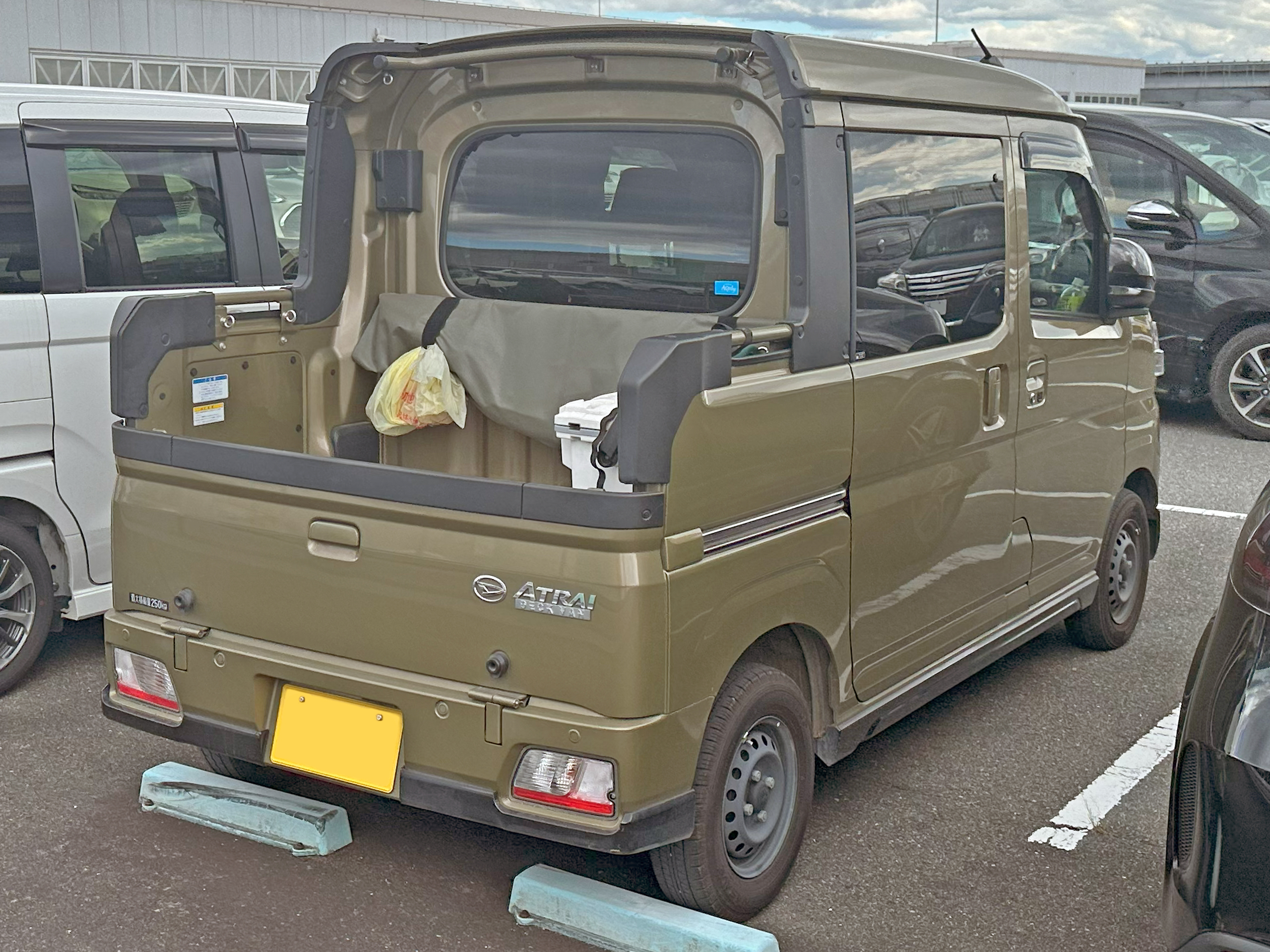
Atrai Deck Van (S700W)

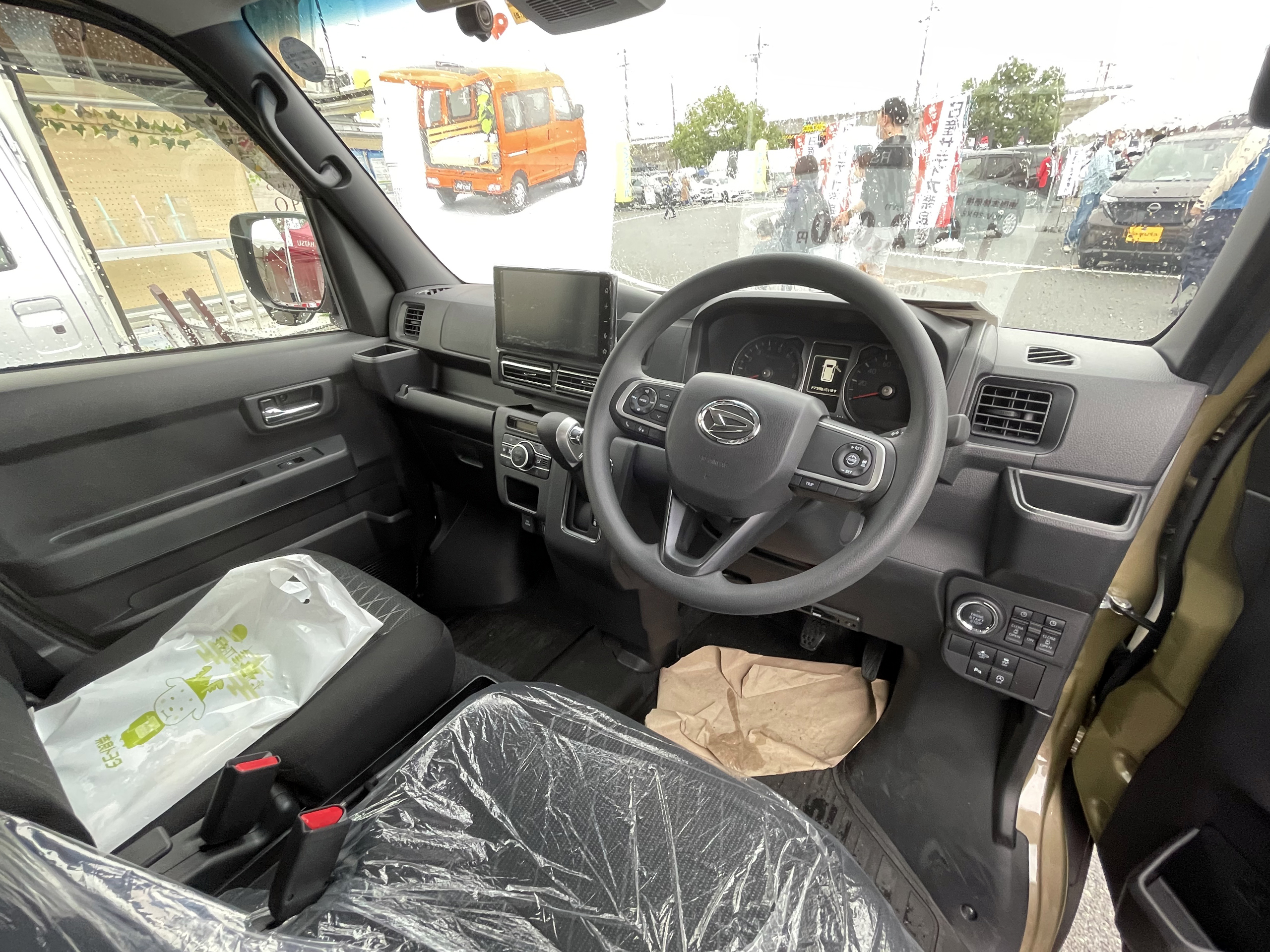
Atrai interior

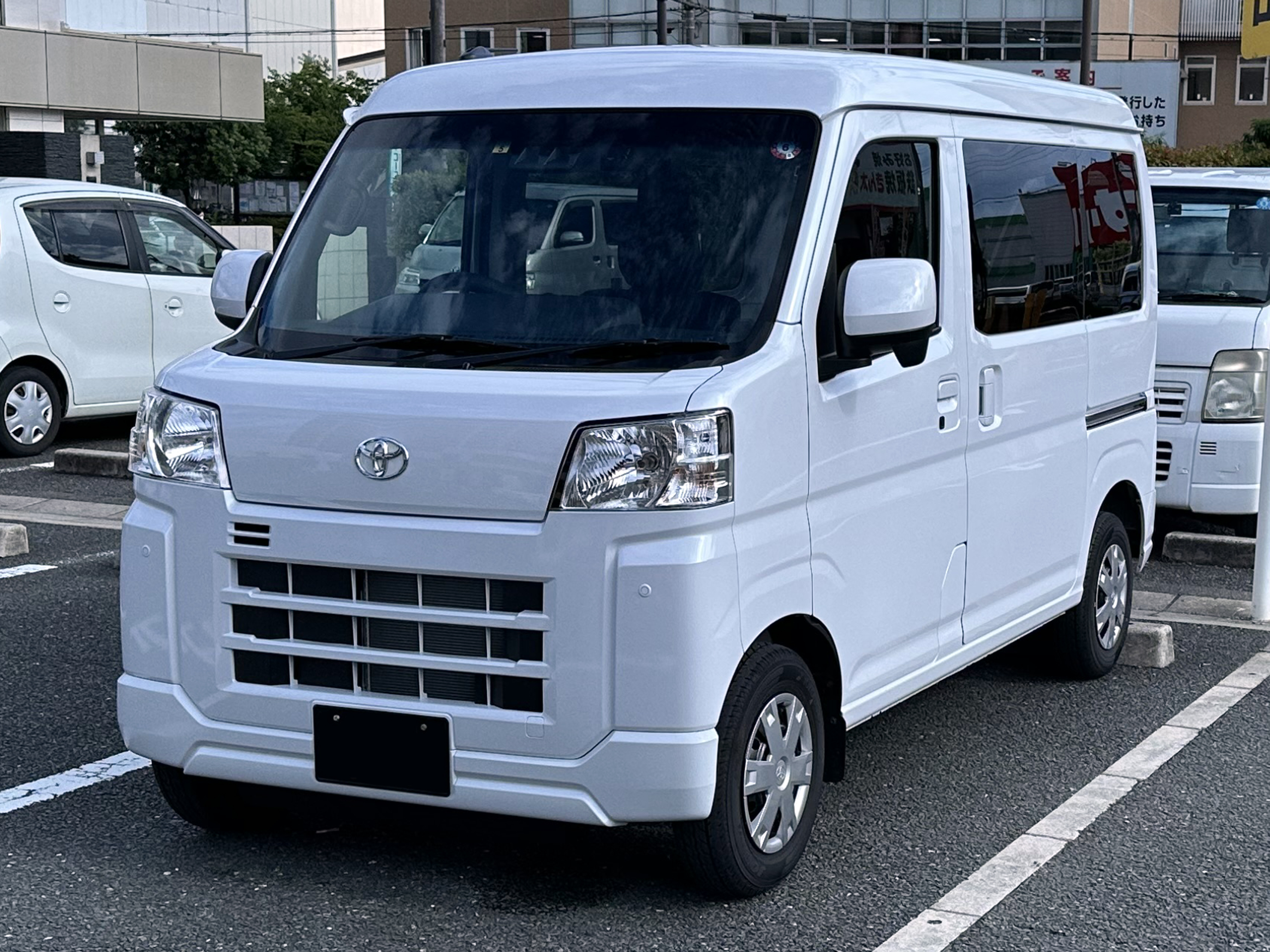
Toyota Pixis Van (front view)

==== Battery electric versions ====
In May 2023, the battery electric (BEV) version of the Hijet Cargo was announced. It will also be marketed as the Toyota Pixis Van and Suzuki e Every, as Suzuki is part of Toyota's EV development consortium. The prototype model was showcased during the 49th G7 summit in Hiroshima, Japan.

Production of the e-Hijet Cargo started on 2 February 2026 alongside the Pixis Van. The powertrain is equipped with the BEV system "e-Smart Electric" jointly developed with Suzuki and Toyota, with the "eAxle" integrating the motor, inverter and reducer on the rear drive axle, and a large-capacity battery using phosphate lithium-ion batteries placed under the floor. The e Every went on sale on 9 March 2026.

The e-Hijet Cargo's passenger car equivalent (known as the e-Atrai) is sold in a sole RS variant. It features black steel wheels, color-matched accents, chrome detailing, and power sliding doors on both sides.

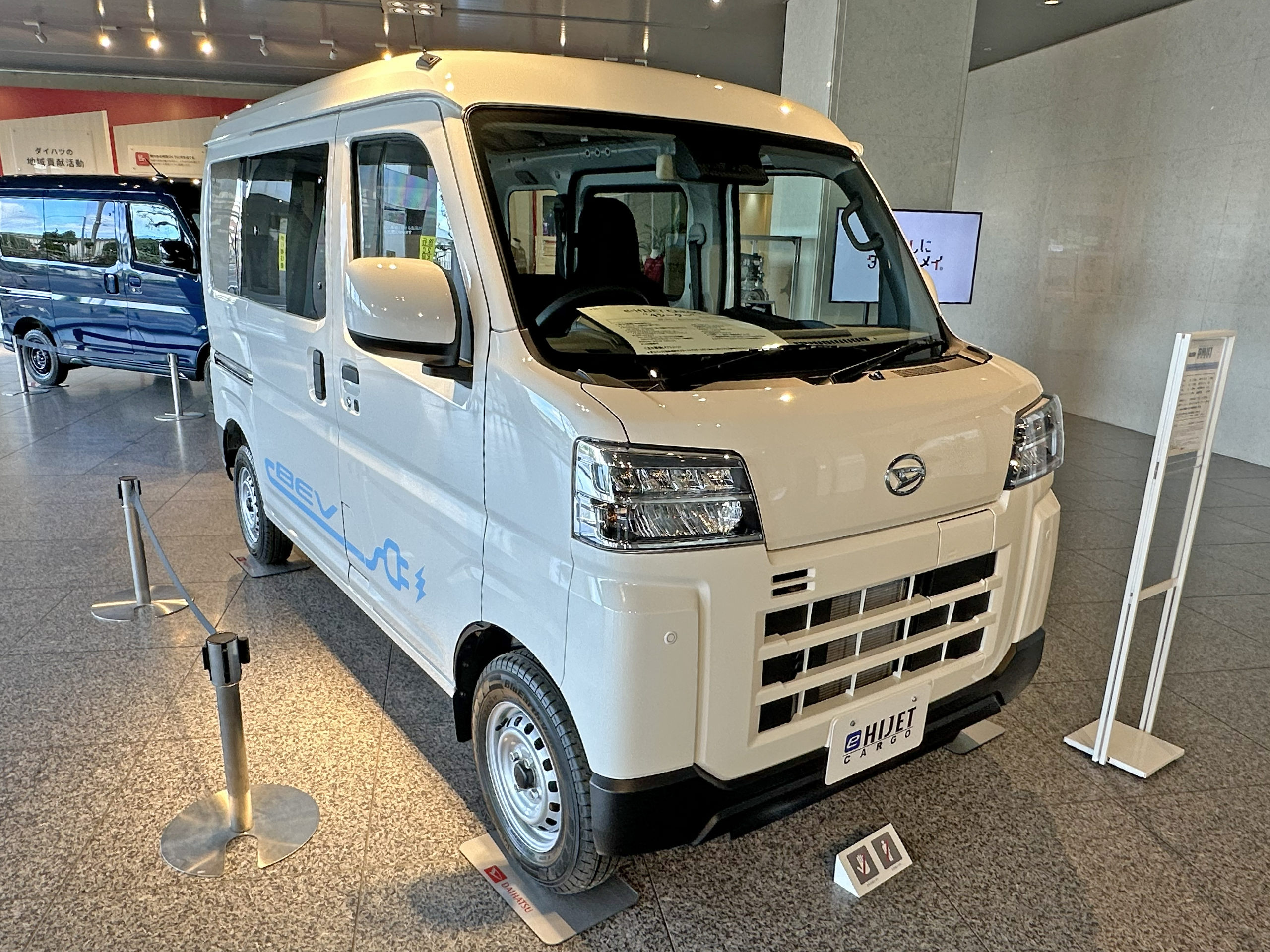
2026 e-Hijet Cargo

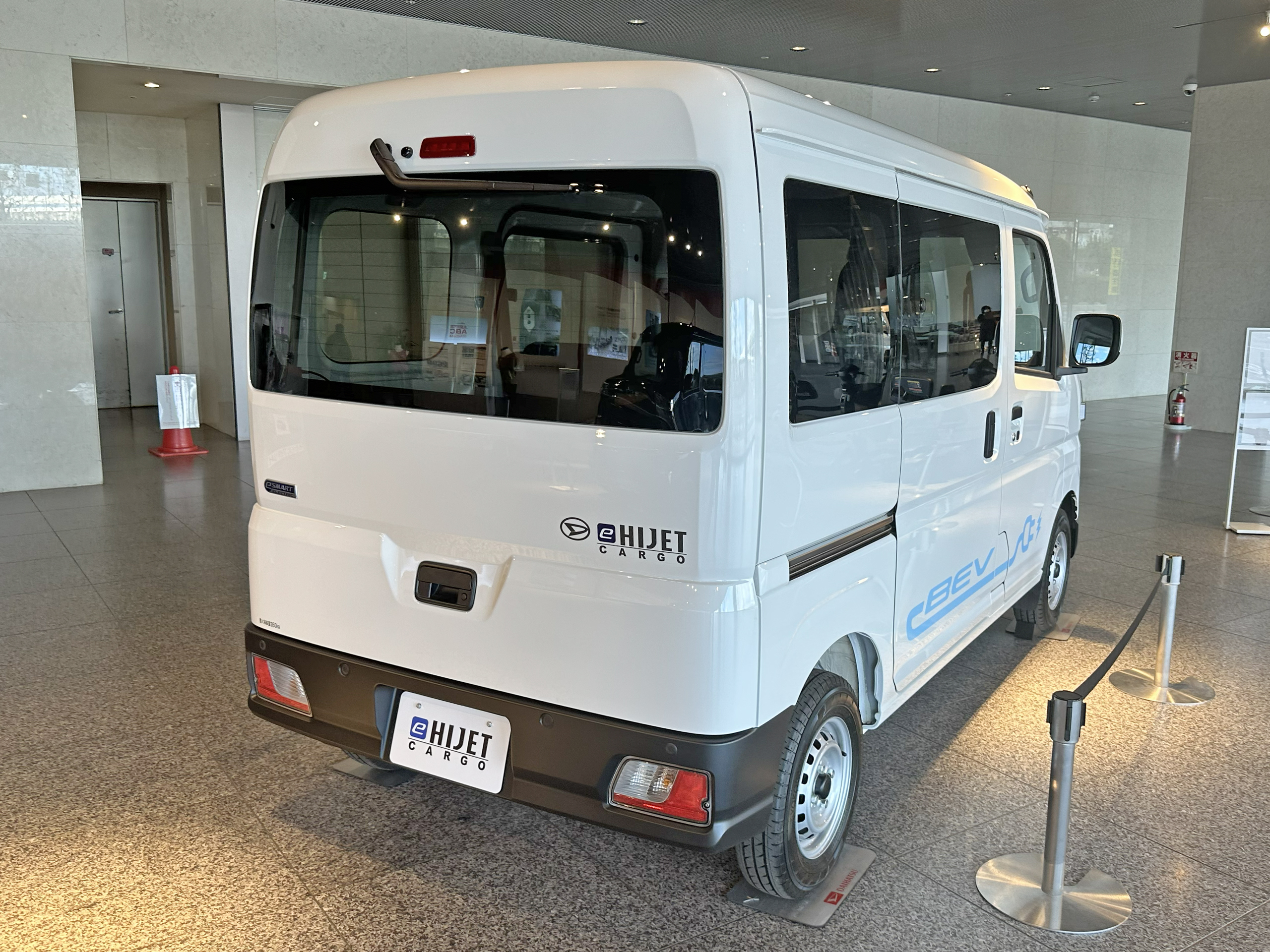
e-Hijet Cargo rear view

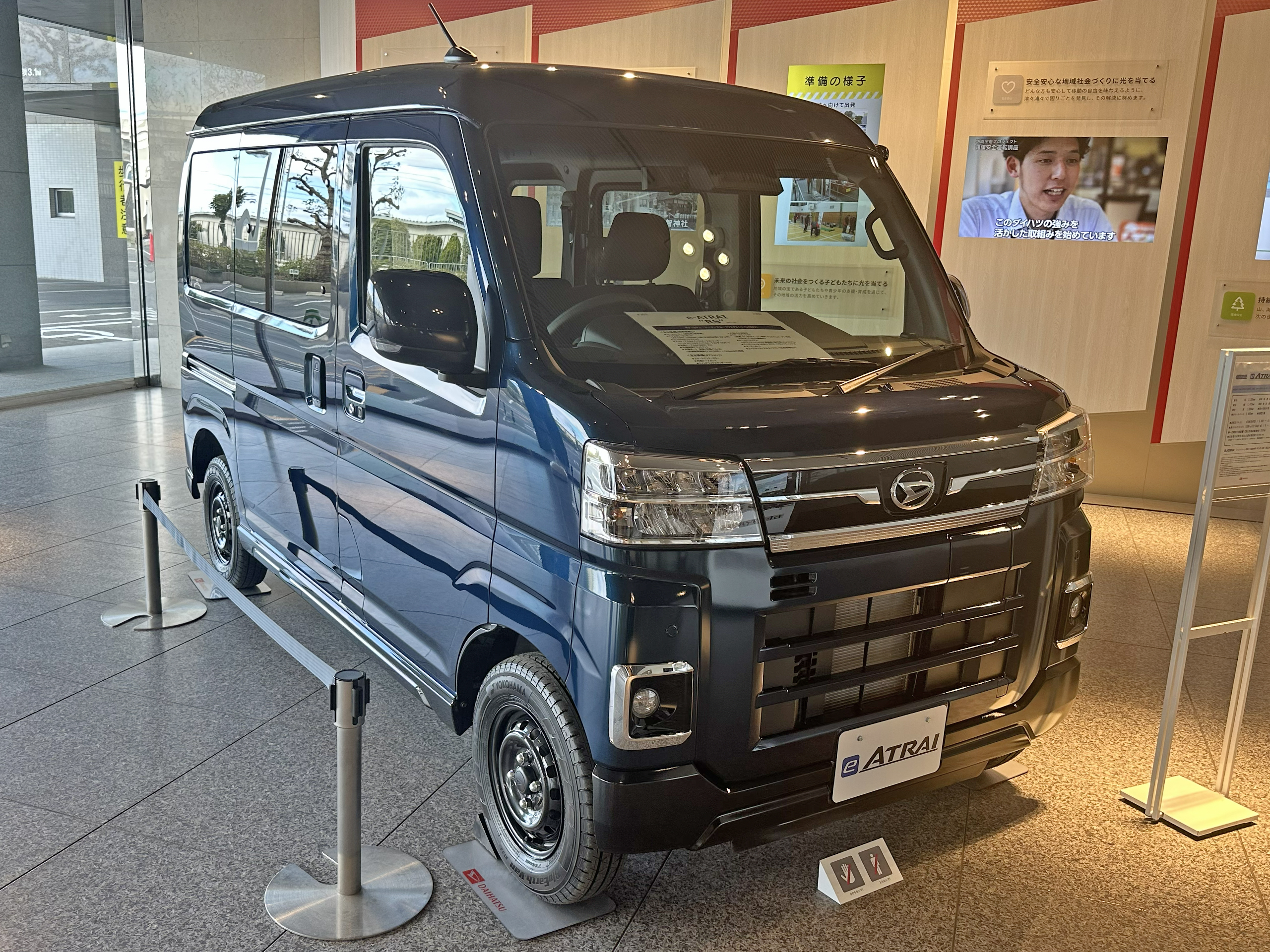
2026 e-Atrai

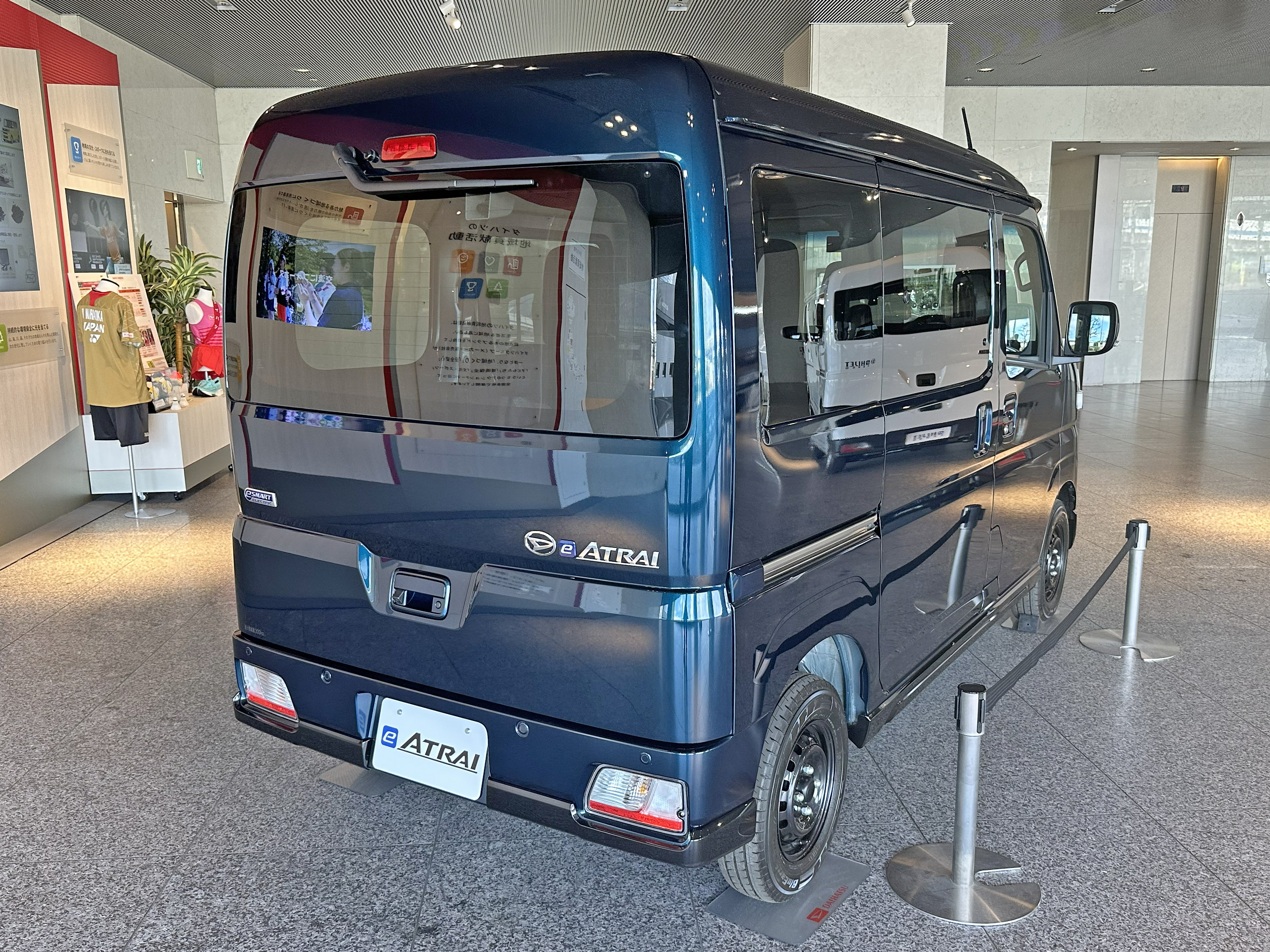
e-Atrai rear view

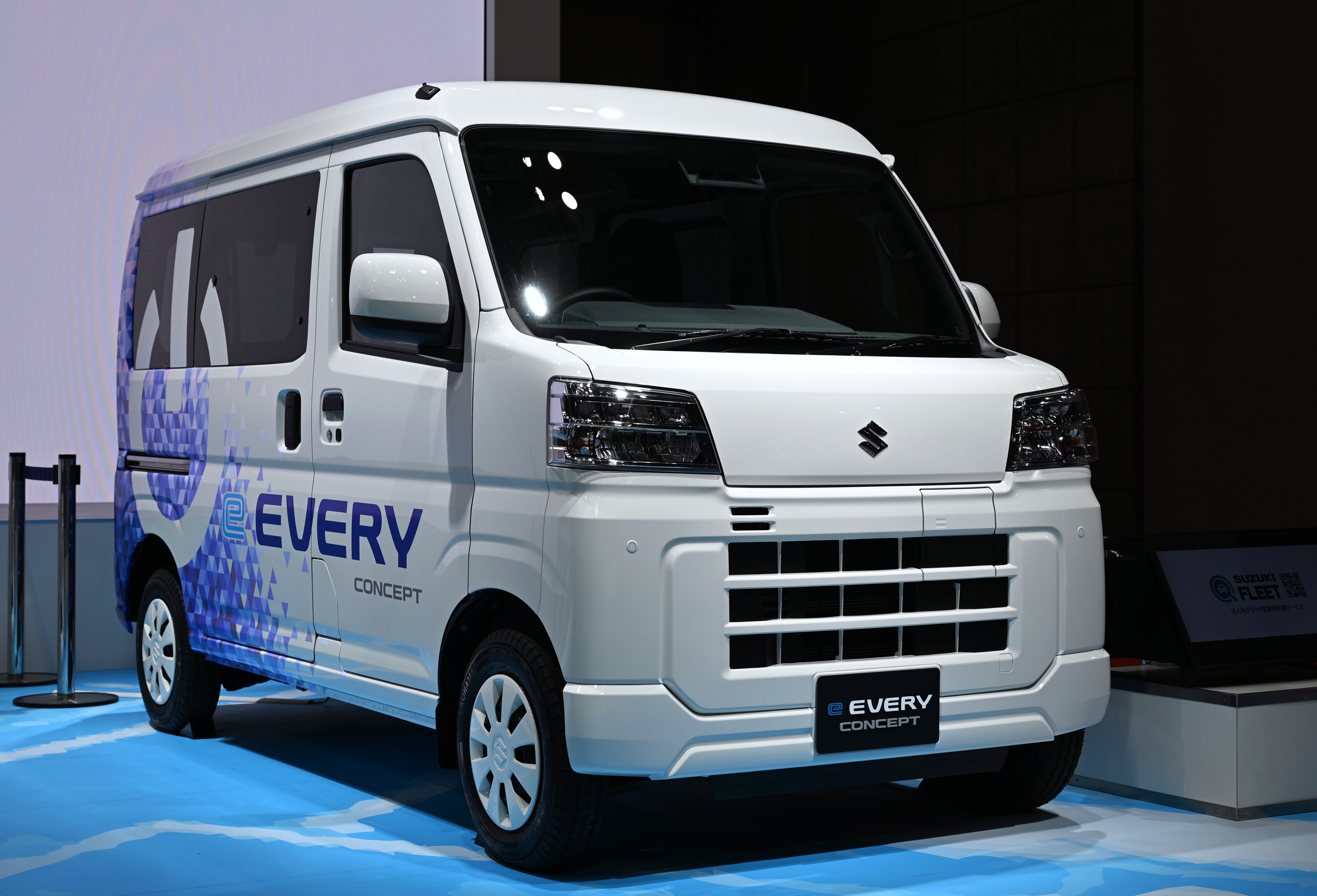
Suzuki e Every Concept

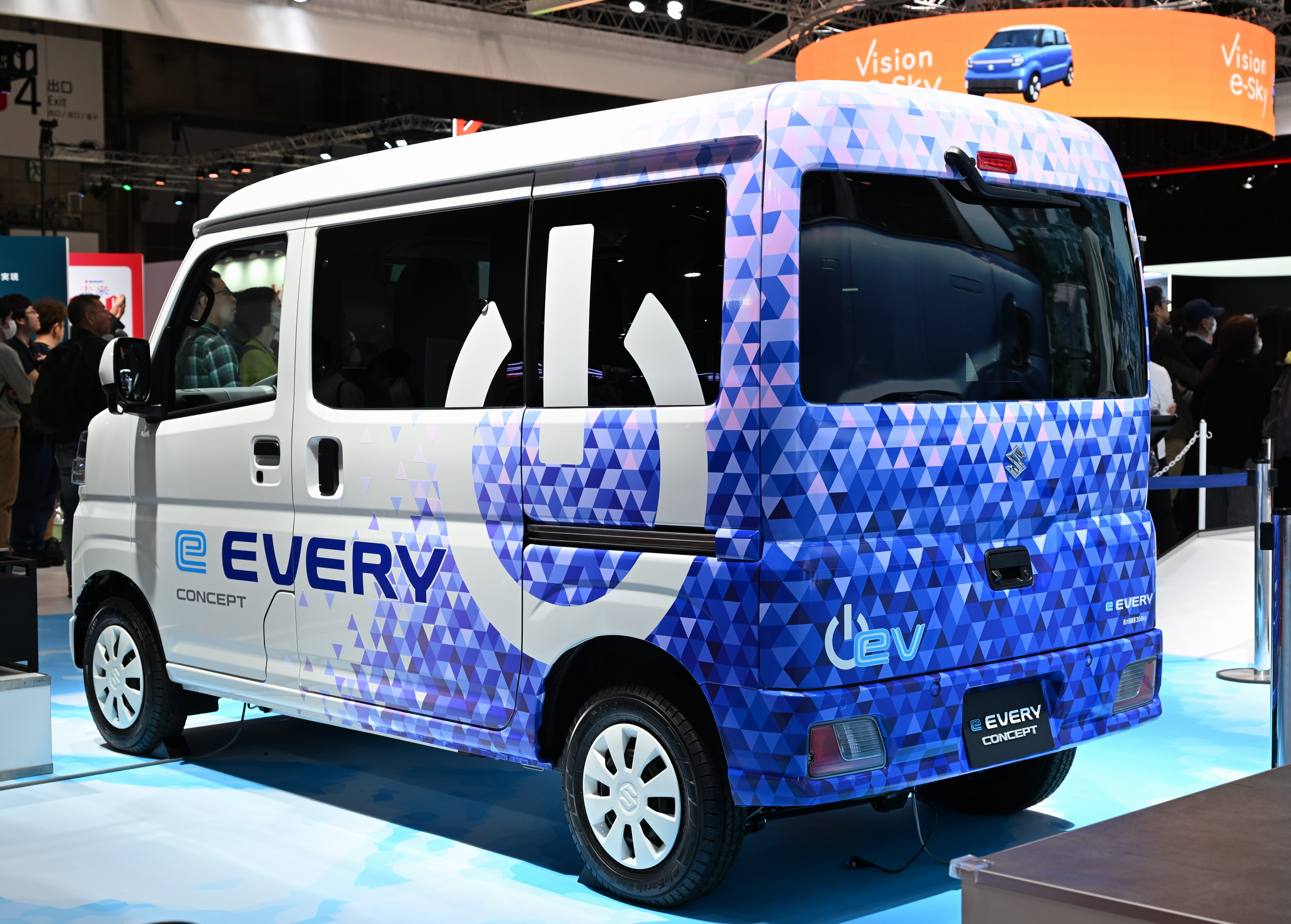
e Every Concept rear view

== Variants and derivatives ==
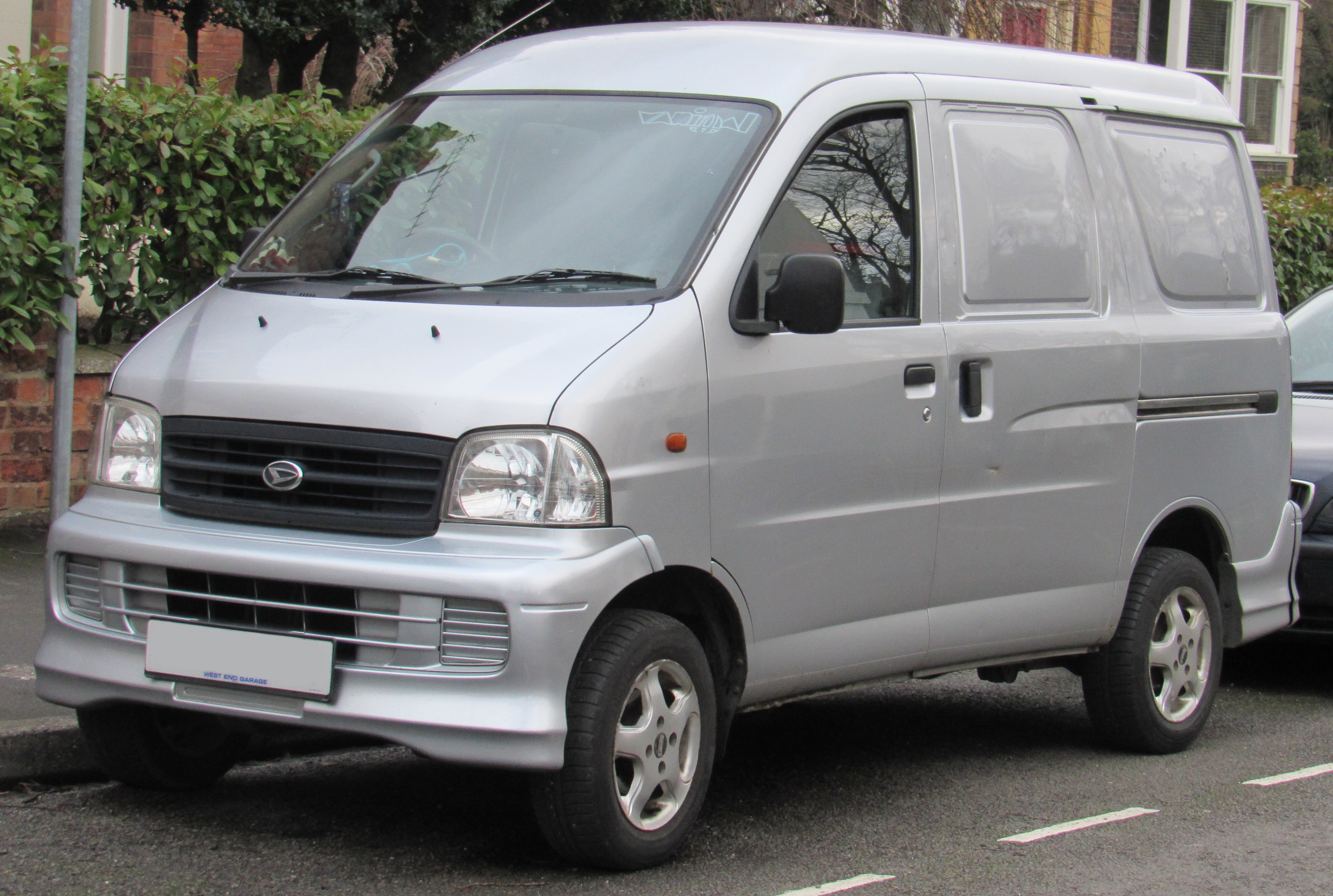
Daihatsu Extol

There were some versions of the Hijet sold outside Japan, which were available with 1.0 or 1.3-liter engines. These were no longer considered kei cars, as they are wider and longer than allowed by these narrowly defined regulations. The Zebra (also known as the Hijet Maxx/Citivan) was originally derived from the Japanese-market Hijet but later became the separate model. It was also originally a one-liter car but later became available with 1.3 and 1.6 engines. The 1.6 was replaced by a 1.5-liter model in January 2002. The Perodua Rusa is a rebadged Zebra sold by Daihatsu's Malaysian partner, Perodua. In the Japanese market, there was also a larger version of the ninth generation Hijet, sold as the Hijet Gran Cargo. This car has been exported to other right-hand drive markets as the Extol as well.

=== Piaggio Porter ===
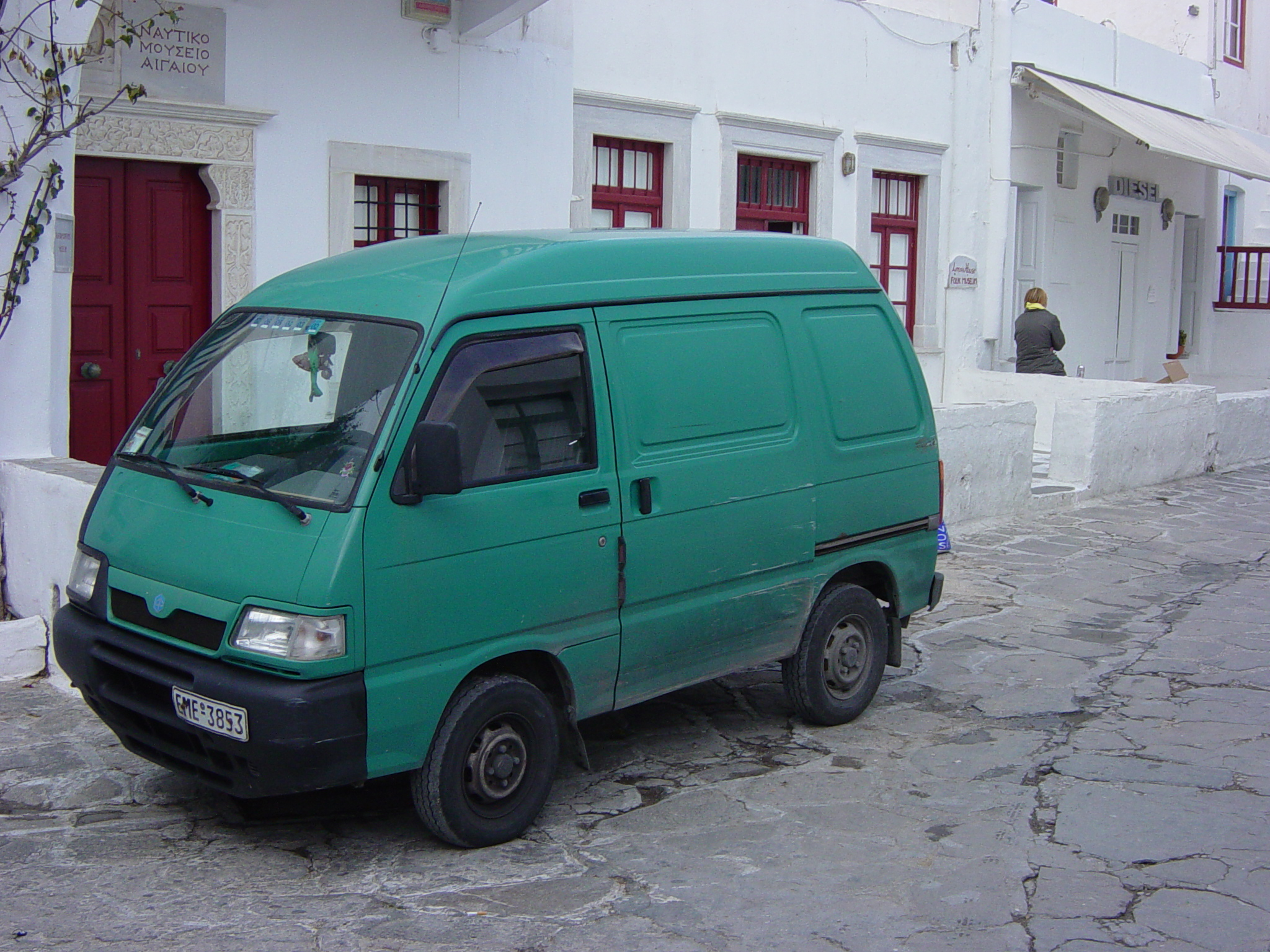
Piaggio Porter based on the seventh generation Hijet

The Piaggio Porter was a licensed version of the seventh-generation Hijet manufactured in Pontedera, Italy, between 1992 and 2021, and sold with diesel, LPG, CNG or electric motors. These Italian-built vans were also sold with Daihatsu Hijet nameplates in certain markets to get around quota restrictions on Japanese-made vehicles, while some passenger versions were also sold as the Innocenti Porter. They were originally equipped with a 48 PS (35 kW) 1.0 gasoline or a 35 PS (26 kW) 1.2-liter Lombardini diesel. Top speeds for these early models are 119 and 110 km/h (74 and 68 mph) respectively. More recent cars receive a 1269 cc gasoline/LPG engine or a 1371 cc diesel. The 1.3 offers 65 PS (48 kW) in either configuration while the 1.4 diesel only manages 38 PS (28 kW). All of these Porter variants (S85) are based on the facelifted seventh generation of the Hijet (S82) which has its front wheel located below the front door and a mid-mounted engine. Since 2013 the Porter has also been manufactured at Piaggio's Baramati plant (Pune, India) for Asian markets.

Indian-made Porters also have various other engine options, such as the Porter 600, which is equipped with a 511 cc CRDs diesel engine producting 10.05 hp (7.5 kW). This vehicle has a 605 kg (1,334 lb) payload and can reach a top speed of 60 km/h (37 mph).

== Hybrid Hijet ==
In 2002, Daihatsu debuted the Hijet Cargo Hybrid concept, a hybrid electric van, in Japan using a 660 cc engine. The car is based on the existing non-hybrid Hijet Cargo. Daihatsu calls it a mild hybrid design. Its design (called Daihatsu Mild Hybrid System or DMHS based on Toyota hybrid technology) is quite different from many existing hybrid design where as the gas and electric powered components assembled as one unit. The electric motor sits between the gasoline-powered engine and the transmission unit. The car is 30% more fuel efficient than its gasoline-powered counterpart.

The hybrid minicars (called FEV and Atrai Hybrid-IV) made their debut in 2002 as a concept minicar. Its production was announced in October 2004 but never entered production as Daihatsu chose to release hybrid versions of newer models instead.
