= Daihatsu New Line =

Daihatsu vehicles

The Daihatsu New-Line was a compact series of pickup trucks and vans built by Daihatsu from 1963 until 1968. They were based on the Daihatsu Hijet "keitora" and microvans, although they were somewhat larger and sturdier. The 797 cc inline-four engine also seen in the Daihatsu Compagno was fitted, rather than the 356 cc two-stroke unit seen in the Hijet.

== First generation (L50) ==
Series L50

Overview
- Manufacturer: Daihatsu
- Production: January 1963 – February 1966

Body and chassis
- Class: Van
- Body style: Van; Pickup truck
- Layout: front-engine, rear-wheel drive
- Related: Daihatsu Fellow (L37); Daihatsu Hijet (L35/36)

Powertrain
- Engine: 797 cc FC OHV I4
- Transmission: 3-speed manual

Dimensions
- Wheelbase: 2,220 mm (87 in)
- Length: 3,340 mm (131 in)
- Width: 1,290 mm (51 in)
- Height: 1,430 mm (56 in)
- Curb weight: 640 kg (1,410 lb)

Based on the first Hijet (of late 1960), the first New-Line used a conventional front-engine, rear-wheel-drive format with the driver sitting behind the engine, in a similar pickup fashion. It arrived in January 1963. It was 350 mm (14 in) longer than the Hijet and could carry 500 kg (1,102 lb) thanks to a larger, 800 cc engine with 41 PS (30 kW). Top speed for the low-geared vehicle is 95 km/h (59 mph). This car did not meet the strict kei car standards of the time and sold only in small numbers, until its replacement in February 1966. The cargo space was more useful, up from 1,075 mm (42.3 in) to 1,405 mm (55.3 in).

== Second generation (S50) ==
New-Line Cab

Overview
- Manufacturer: Daihatsu
- Production: February 1966 – March 1968

Body and chassis
- Class: Kei truck
- Body style: Pickup truck
- Layout: mid-engine, rear-wheel drive
- Related: Daihatsu Hijet

Powertrain
- Engine: 797 cc FC OHV I4
- Transmission: 4-speed manual

Dimensions
- Length: 3,215 mm (126.6 in) (S50); 3,210 mm (126.4 in) (S50T)
- Width: 1,345 mm (53.0 in)
- Height: 1,615 mm (64 in)

The smaller Hijet adopted a cab-over approach in 1964, retaining availability of the first generation bonneted style. From February 1966 an 800 cc version of this Hijet was also available, as the "Daihatsu New-Line Cab" (S50, S50T). It replaced the earlier L50 New Line. As for its predecessor, it shared its engine with the Daihatsu Compagno. The New Line Cab was built until March 1968, and was replaced by the somewhat larger Daihatsu Delta 750.
