= F200 =

F200, F 200, F.200 or F-200 may refer to:

- Drilling Rigs F200
- ESP F-200, an ESP Guitars model
- Farman F.200, a 1929 French civil utility aircraft
- Mercedes-Benz F200, a 1996 concept car unveiled at the Paris Motor Show
- Goliath F200, a 1933 three-wheeler freight truck
- Daihatsu Hi-Line F200, a 1964 model of truck
- Tamandaré (F200), a Brazilian Navy frigate
