= Daihatsu Hi-Line =

Daihatsu F series/Hi-Line

Overview
- Manufacturer: Daihatsu
- Production: 1960–1972
- Assembly: Ikeda, Osaka, Japan

Body and chassis
- Class: Compact pickup truck; Minivan (F100V)
- Body style: 2-door single cab; 3-door station wagon (F100V); 4-door double cab
- Layout: Front-engine, rear-wheel-drive layout

Powertrain
- Engine: Petrol: 1490 cc FA I4 OHV 8v (F100/100V/108/175); 1861 cc FB I4 OHV 8v (F200); Diesel: 1484 cc I4 (D150) OHV 8v
- Transmission: 4-speed manual

Dimensions
- Wheelbase: 2,565 mm (101.0 in) (F100); 2,720 mm (107.1 in) (F200); 2,860 mm (112.6 in) (F108)
- Length: 4,160 mm (163.8 in) (F100); 4,270 mm (168.1 in) (F100V); 4,665 mm (183.7 in) (F175); 4,690 mm (184.6 in) (F108/200)
- Width: 1,560 mm (61.4 in) (F100/108); 1,680 mm (66.1 in) (F175/200)
- Height: 1,555 mm (61.2 in) (F100V); 1,590 mm (62.6 in) (F100/108); 1,725 mm (67.9 in) (F175/200)
- Curb weight: 1,140 kg (2,513.3 lb) (F100); 1,200 kg (2,645.5 lb) (F100V)

Chronology
- Successor: Toyota Hilux

Rear view

The Daihatsu Hi-Line/F series (Japanese: ダイハツ・ハイライン/Fシリーズ) is a series of compact pickup trucks, manufactured and sold from 1960 to 1972. This truck series competed against rivals such as the Toyota Stout, Nissan Junior, Prince Miler, Hino Briska or Mazda B series.

The truck was released in 1960 and available in two models; a 1.75-tonne class "F175" with 68 PS (50.0 kW; 67.1 hp) 1.5-litre FA engine (same engine that powered the larger Daihatsu V200 truck) and a 1.5-tonne class "D150" with 40 PS (29.4 kW; 39.5 hp) 1.5-litre diesel engine.

In 1962, a new 1-tonne load capacity class called "Hi-Line" was introduced to fill the class below the higher duty F175/D150 trucks. This truck was available in two versions; short deck "F100" and long deck "F108". Both models were powered by the same engine as the F175. A 3-door van version based on F100 called "F100V" was introduced in 1963. In the same year, a 2-tonne class truck called "F200" was also introduced and powered with a 85 PS (62.5 kW; 83.8 hp) 1.9-litre FB petrol engine, but it was discontinued quickly in 1964.

To celebrate the 1964 Tokyo Olympics, a Hi-Line was used to accompany two Daihatsu Compagno Berlinas for 18,000 km (11,184.7 mi) trip from olympic flame in Olympia, Greece to Tokyo.

The trucks received a facelift in 1965, the headlights were changed from single to twin round units. Also in this year, all models except the F100/108 trucks were discontinued. The second facelift occurred in October 1968 with brand new big single rectangular headlights and the load capacity was increased to 1.25 tonnes.

In November 1967, Toyota formed a business alliance with Daihatsu. As part of the alliance's agreement, the F series was later discontinued in 1972 and replaced with the more popular Toyota Hilux.

The name of "Hiline" was reused by Daihatsu for 2WD diesel variant of Daihatsu Taft wagon/truck for Indonesian market from 1986 to 2007. Even though it too carries an F model code (F69), this car has no relation with the original Hi-line/F series trucks.
