= List of Daihatsu engines =

The Daihatsu engines are varieties of automobile engines that used mainly for Daihatsu's own vehicles, Toyota, Perodua and numerous brands around the world.

== A ==
The Daihatsu A-series engine is a range of 0.55 L to 0.62 L compact inline-two petrol engines.

== C ==
The Daihatsu C-series engine is a range of 0.84 L to 1.0 L inline-three petrol and diesel engines.

== D ==
The Daihatsu D-series is a series of water-cooled OHV 8-valve inline-four swirl chamber diesel engines.

=== DE ===
- Displacement: 2270 cc
- Bore and stroke: 83.3 mm x 104.0 mm
- Power output: 63 PS @3600rpm
- Applications:
  - Daihatsu DO13T
  - Daihatsu D200
  - Daihatsu Light Bus (SV22N/SV27N)

=== DG ===
- Displacement: 2530 cc
- Bore and stroke: 88.0 mm x 104.0 mm
- Compression ratio: 21.0:1
- Power output: 62-75 PS @3300-3500rpm
- Torque output: 135-172 N.m @2200-2400rpm
- Applications:
  - Daihatsu D300
  - Daihatsu Delta (DV26/SV18L/SV26/V20/V22/V24)
  - Daihatsu Light Bus (SV32N/SV37N)
  - Daihatsu Taft (F50)

=== DL ===
- Displacement: 2765 cc
- Bore and stroke: 92.0 mm x 104.0 mm
- Naturally aspirated (DL42/43), turbodiesel (DL50/51), turbodiesel with intercooler (DL52/62)
- Power output: 69-115 PS @3400-3800rpm

Torque output: 152-255 N.m @1900-2200rpm

- Compression ratio: 21.2:1
- Applications:
  - Daihatsu Delta (V57/58/82/83)
  - Daihatsu Rugger (F70/75)
  - Daihatsu Taft (F60)

Note: There was also available an unnamed 1484 cc water-cooled four cylinder diesel engine with power output 40 PS at 3800 rpm fitted to the 1960-1962 Daihatsu D150 truck, which appeared before the DE engine.

== E ==
The Daihatsu E-series engine is a range of 0.5 L to 1.0 L inline-three petrol engines.

== F ==
The Daihatsu F-series engine is a series of OHV 8-valve water-cooled inline-four engine.

=== FA ===
- Displacement: 1490 cc
- Bore and stroke: 78.0 mm x 78.0 mm
- Compression ratio: 8.2:1.
- Power output: 68-70 PS @4800rpm
- Torque: 128 N.m @3600rpm
- Applications:
  - Daihatsu BO/CF/CM
  - Daihatsu Delta 1500
  - Daihatsu F100/F175/Daihatsu Hi-Line
  - Daihatsu Light Bus DV200N/SV151N/SV16N
  - Daihatsu V100/150/200

=== FB ===
- Displacement: 1861 cc
- Power output: 80-85 PS @4600rpm
- Torque output: 152 N.m
- Applications:
  - Daihatsu CO
  - Daihatsu Delta 2000
  - Daihatsu F200
  - Daihatsu Light Bus DV201N/NR250/NR251/SV20N
  - Daihatsu V200

=== FC ===
- Displacement: 797 cc
- Bore and stroke: 62.0 mm x 66.0 mm.
- 39-41 PS @5000rpm & 63.7 N.m @3500 rpm.
- Applications:
  - Daihatsu Compagno 800
  - Daihatsu New Line
- 50 PS @6500 rpm
- Application:
  - Daihatsu Sport Vignale (concept car)

=== FD ===
- Displacement: 2433 cc
- Power output: 95 PS
- Applications:
  - Daihatsu Light Bus DV30N/SV30N/SV35N
  - Daihatsu V300

=== FE ===
- Displacement: 958 cc
- Bore and stroke: 68.0 mm x 66.0 mm
- Single carburettor
- Compression ratio: 7.8:1
- Power & torque: 55–58 PS (40–43 kW) at 5500 rpm, 77–78 N⋅m (57–58 lb⋅ft) at 4000 rpm
- Applications:
  - Daihatsu Compagno 1000
  - Daihatsu Consorte 1000 HL/TL/PS
  - Daihatsu Taft (F10)
- Twin-carburretor
- Compression ratio: 9.5:1
- Power & torque: 65 PS (48 kW) at 6500 rpm, 76.5 N⋅m (56 lb⋅ft) at 4500 rpm
- Application:
  - Daihatsu Compagno Spider/1000GT
- Fuel injection (65 PS)
- Application:
  - Daihatsu Compagno 1000GT Injection

==== R92A/B ====
Racing engines based from bored up FE engine, the displacement was increased from 958 cc to 1261 cc with new 78.0 mm bore size from FA engine. This new engine was known as R92A and used for powering the 1965-1966 Daihatsu P3 and 1967 Daihatsu P5 race cars. The cylinder head was also modified from 8-valve OHV to 16-valve DOHC, an extremely rare configuration at that time. At first the power output was originally 110 PS (81 kW) which was then increased to 130 PS (96 kW) at 8000 rpm.

In 1968, the engine displacement was increased again to 1298 cc with new bore and strokes of 78.5 mm x 67.1 mm and also renamed to R92B. Equipped with new two Mikuni-Solex 50PHH carburettors, the power also increased to 140 PS (103 kW) at 8000rpm with 127 N.m at 7000 rpm of torque.

== H ==
The Daihatsu H-series engine is a series of SOHC 16-valve inline-four water-cooled petrol engine, ranging from 1.3 L to 1.6 L.

== J ==
The Daihatsu J-series engine is a series of inline-four engines, which was fitted with a twin scroll turbo and intercooler in the Copen, that was specially developed for Daihatsu's kei cars in combination with Yamaha. It was produced from August 1994 to August 2012.

This was the only inline-four engine for Daihatsu's kei cars, debuted in the Daihatsu Mira L502 that was launched in September 1994. The Second Generation Copen uses the KF-DET turbocharged I3, a Daihatsu K-series engine.

== K ==
The Daihatsu K3/KJ/KSZ engine is a series of 1.0 L to 1.5 L inline four petrol engines.

== KF ==
The Daihatsu KF engine is a series of 658 cc inline-three cylinder DOHC 12 valve water-cooled engine, designed for kei cars. This engine replacing the old EF series engines.

== KR ==
A 996 cc inline-three cylinder engine series designed and produced by Daihatsu (also by Toyota as 1KR-FE), applied in numerous Daihatsu Global A Segment Platform and DNGA city cars.

== NR ==
A series of inline-four DOHC engine with Dual VVT-i, ranging from 1.2 L to 1.5 L. Even though this engine is part of Toyota's engine family, but there are two versions of this engine family. The Daihatsu version is produced at Daihatsu's plant in Indonesia, by Perodua in Malaysia and later in Thailand by Toyota. It is using lower cost low carbon steel material and labelled with "VE" code (a code for Daihatsu engines with VVT-i), while the Toyota version is using more expensive and lighter aluminium alloy material and labelled with "FE" code (Toyota's code for narrow-angle DOHC engine with fuel injection). This Daihatsu version is only fitted to Daihatsu's developed cars, intended for developing markets. A version with "VEX" code is used in conjunction with an electric motor in a hybrid system.

=== 1NR-VE ===
- Displacement: 1.3 L (1,329 cc)
- Bore x Stroke: 72.5 mm × 80.5 mm
- Compression Ratio: 11–11.5:1
- Maximum Power: 95–98 PS @ 6000rpm
- Maximum Torque: 120–122 N⋅m @ 4000–4200rpm
- Applications:
  - Daihatsu Xenia/Toyota Avanza (2015–present)
  - Perodua Bezza (2016–present)
  - Perodua Myvi/Daihatsu Sirion (2017–present)
  - Toyota Vios/Yaris sedan (2022–present)

=== 2NR-VE ===
- Displacement: 1.5 L (1,496 cc)
- Bore x Stroke: 72.5 mm × 90.6 mm
- Compression Ratio: 10.5–11.5:1
- Maximum Power: 104–106 PS @ 6000rpm
- Maximum Torque: 136–138 N⋅m @ 4200rpm
- Applications:
  - Daihatsu Xenia/Toyota Avanza (2015–present)
  - Daihatsu Terios/Toyota Rush (2017–present)
  - Perodua Myvi (2017–present)
  - Perodua Aruz (2019–present)
  - Daihatsu Grand Max/Toyota LiteAce/TownAce/Mazda Bongo (2020–present)
  - Perodua Alza (2022–present)
  - Toyota Veloz (2022–present)
  - Toyota Vios/Yaris sedan (2022–present)

=== 2NR-VEX ===
- Displacement: 1.5 L (1,496 cc)
- Bore x Stroke: 72.5 mm × 90.6 mm
- Maximum Power
  - Engine only: 91 PS @ 5500rpm
  - 1NM electric motor: 80 PS @ ????rpm
  - Combined output: 111 PS @ ????rpm
- Maximum Torque
  - Engine only: 121 N⋅m @ 4000-4800rpm
  - 1NM electric motor: 141 N.m @ ????rpm
- Applications:
  - Toyota Yaris Cross Hybrid (2023–present)

=== 3NR-VE ===
- Displacement: 1.2 L (1,197 cc)
- Bore x Stroke: 72.5 mm × 72.5 mm
- Compression Ratio 10.5:1
- Maximum Output: 88–94 PS @ 6000rpm
- Maximum Torque: 108–110 N⋅m @ 4200rpm
- Applications:
  - Daihatsu Sigra/Toyota Calya (2016–present)
  - Daihatsu Ayla/Toyota Agya/Wigo (2017–2023)
  - Toyota Yaris Ativ (2022–present)

== Single Cylinder ==
A series of Daihatsu water-cooled single cylinder 4-stroke engines, used for three-wheeled trucks.

=== GK ===
Displacement is 736 cc and power output is 14.5 PS.

- Daihatsu SK
- Daihatsu SSR

=== GT ===
Displacement is 744 cc, bore and stroke is 95.0 mm x 105.0 mm, compression ratio is 4.8:1, Power output is 15.8 PS at 3500 rpm and torque 38 Nm at 2000 rpm.

== V-Twin ==
A series of OHV air-cooled 90° v-twin cylinder engines used in various Daihatsu vehicles in 1930s to early 1960s.

=== 2HA ===
The Daihatsu 2HA engine is a horizontal engine that was developed for Daihatsu Bee (1951-1952).

The 2HA engine was available in two version, 540 cc and 804 cc. The earlier version was a 540 cc, with output 13.5 PS (13.3 hp; 9.9 kW) and the larger 804 cc available shortly, with output increased to 18 PS (17.8 hp; 13.2 kW).

=== GLA ===
Displacement is 751 cc, bore and stroke is 75.0 mm x 85.0 mm, compression ratio is 6.5:1, power output is 25 PS @3800rpm and torque is 52 N.m @3000rpm.

- Daihatsu PF
- Daihatsu PL7
- Daihatsu SKC

=== GMA ===
Displacement is 1135 cc and power output is 35 PS.

- Daihatsu BF/BM
- Daihatsu CM/CO
- Daihatsu PM
- Daihatsu RKM
- Daihatsu UM

=== GOB ===
Displacement is 1477 cc, bore and stroke is 97.0 mm x 100.0 mm, compression ratio is 6.3:1, power output is 45-53 PS.

- Daihatsu RKO
- Daihatsu UO
- Daihatsu Vesta

=== 732 cc ===
- Daihatsu FA

=== 854 cc ===
- Daihatsu SKD

=== 1005 cc ===
Power output is 30 PS.

- Daihatsu RKF
- Daihatsu SSH
- Daihatsu UF

=== 1431 cc ===
- Daihatsu SX/SSX

== WA ==
=== WA-VE ===
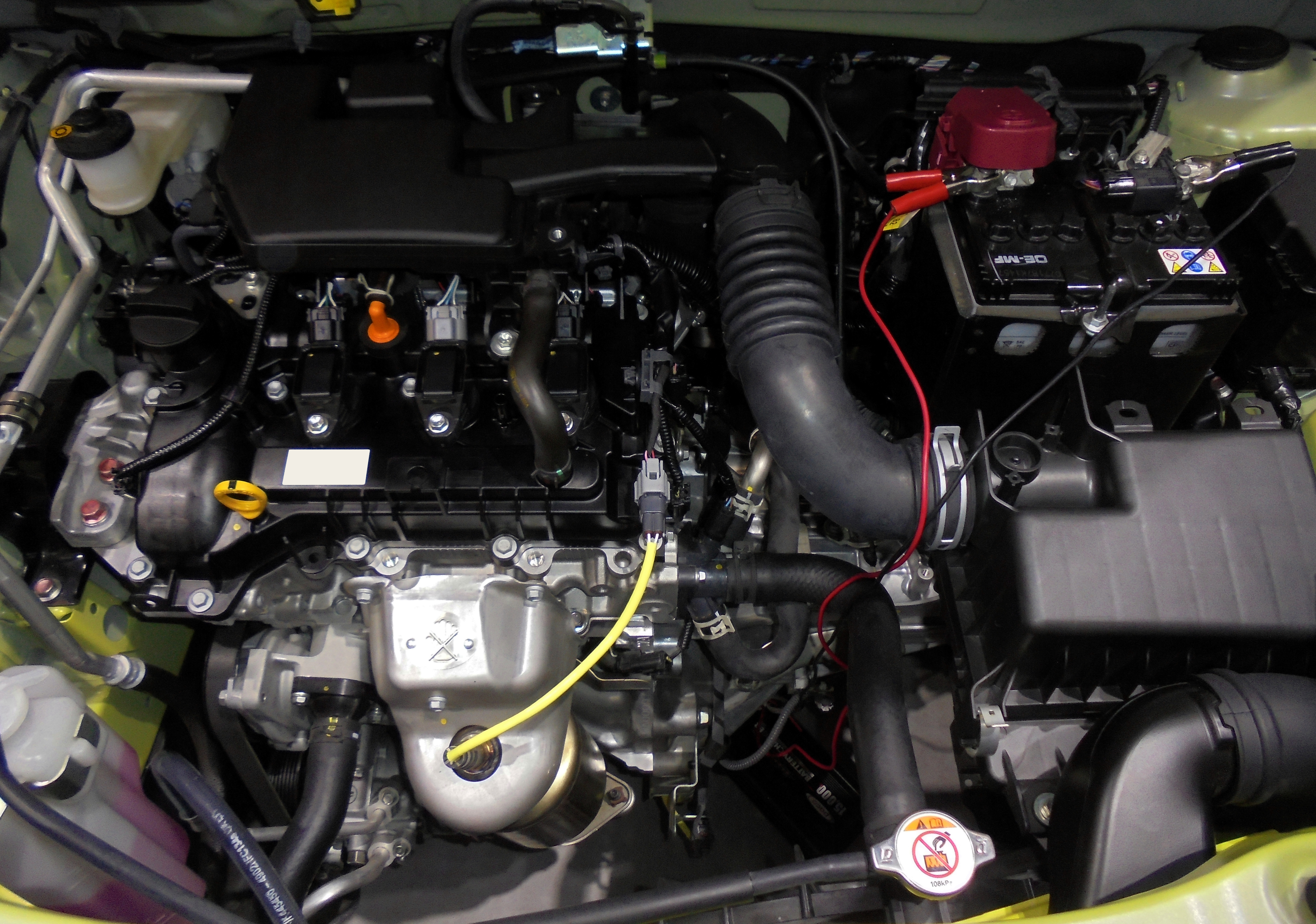
WA-VE engine

An inline-three cylinder engine series designed and produced by Daihatsu.

- Displacement: 1.2 L (1,198 cc)
- Bore x Stroke: 73.5 mm × 94.0 mm
- Compression Ratio: 12.8:1
- Maximum Power: 88 PS @ 6,000 rpm
- Maximum Torque: 113 N⋅m @ 4,500 rpm
- Applications:
  - Daihatsu Rocky / Toyota Raize / Subaru Rex (A200) (2021–present)
  - Daihatsu Ayla / Toyota Agya (A350) (2023–present)

=== WA-VEX ===
- Displacement: 1.2 L (1,198 cc)
- Bore x Stroke: 73.5 mm × 94.0 mm
- Compression Ratio: 12.8:1
- Maximum Power: 82 PS @ 5,600 rpm
- Maximum Torque: 105 N⋅m @ 3,200 – 5,200 rpm
- Applications:
  - Daihatsu Rocky e-Smart Hybrid / Toyota Raize Hybrid / Subaru Rex e-Smart Hybrid (A200) (2021–present)

== Z ==
The Daihatsu Z-series engine is a series of Daihatsu's two-stroke petrol engines.

=== ZA ===
- Production years: 1957-1962
- Single cylinder
- Air-cooled
- Single carburettor
- Total displacement: 249 cc
- Bore x stroke: 65.0 mm × 75.0 mm
- Maximum output: 8–10 PS (5.9–7.4 kW) at 3600-4000 rpm
- Maximum torque: 17.6–18.6 N⋅m (13.0–13.7 lb⋅ft) at 2400-2500 rpm
- Compression ratio: 6.2:1
- Application: Daihatsu Midget (DK/DS/MP/MP2)

=== ZD ===
- Production years: 1959-1971
- Single cylinder
- Air-cooled
- Single carburettor
- Total displacement: 305 cc
- Bore x stroke: 72.0 mm x 75.0 mm
- Maximum output: 12 PS @4500rpm
- Maximum torque: 21.6 N.m @2500rpm
- Compression ratio: 6.2:1
- Application: Daihatsu Midget (MP3/MP4/MP5)

=== ZL ===
- Production years: 1960-1966
- Inline-two cylinder
- Air-cooled
- Single carburettor
- Total displacement: 356 cc
- Bore x stroke: 62.0 mm × 59.0 mm
- Maximum output: 17-21 PS @5000rpm
- Maximum torque: 27.4 Nm @3000rpm
- Compression ratio: 9.0:1
- Applications:
  - Daihatsu Hijet (L/S35)

=== ZM series ===
==== ZM ====
- Production years: 1966-1981
- Inline-two cylinder
- Water-cooled
- Single carburettor
- Total displacement: 356 cc
- Bore x stroke: 62.0 mm × 59.0 mm
- Maximum output: 23-24 PS @5000rpm
- Maximum torque: 34.3 N.m @4000
- Compression ratio: 9.0:1
- Applications:
  - Daihatsu Hijet (L36/S36/37/38)
  - Daihatsu Fellow (L37)

==== ZM4 ====
- Production years: 1970-1972
- Inline-two cylinder
- Water-cooled
- Single carburettor
- Total displacement: 356 cc
- Bore x stroke: 62.0 mm × 59.0 mm
- Maximum output: 33 PS @6500rpm
- Maximum torque: 36.2 N.m @5500
- Compression ratio: 9.0:1
- Applications:
  - Daihatsu Fellow Max (L38)

==== ZM5 ====
- Production years: 1970-1972
- Inline-two cylinder
- Water-cooled
- Dual carburettor
- Total displacement: 356 cc
- Bore x stroke: 62.0 mm × 59.0 mm
- Maximum output: 40 PS @7200rpm
- Maximum torque: 40.2 N.m @6500
- Compression ratio: 11.0:1
- Applications:
  - Daihatsu Fellow Max SS (L38)

==== ZM6 ====
- Production years: 1970-1972
- Inline-two cylinder
- Water-cooled
- Single carburettor
- Total displacement: 356 cc
- Bore x stroke: 62.0 mm × 59.0 mm
- Maximum output: 26 PS @5500rpm
- Maximum torque: 34.3 N.m @4500
- Compression ratio: 9.0:1
- Applications:
  - Daihatsu Hijet (S37)
  - Daihatsu Fellow Buggy (L37PB)

==== ZM12 ====
- Production years: 1972-1976
- Inline-two cylinder
- Water-cooled
- Single carburettor
- Total displacement: 356 cc
- Bore x stroke: 62.0 mm × 59.0 mm
- Maximum output: 31 PS @6000rpm
- Maximum torque: 36.2 N.m @5000
- Compression ratio: 9.0:1
- Applications:
  - Daihatsu Fellow Max (L38)

==== ZM13 ====
- Production years: 1970-1972
- Inline-two cylinder
- Water-cooled
- Dual carburettor
- Total displacement: 356 cc
- Bore x stroke: 62.0 mm × 59.0 mm
- Maximum output: 37 PS @6500rpm
- Maximum torque: 40.2 N.m @6000
- Compression ratio: 9.0:1
- Applications:
  - Daihatsu Fellow Max SS (L38)
