= Daihatsu Midget =

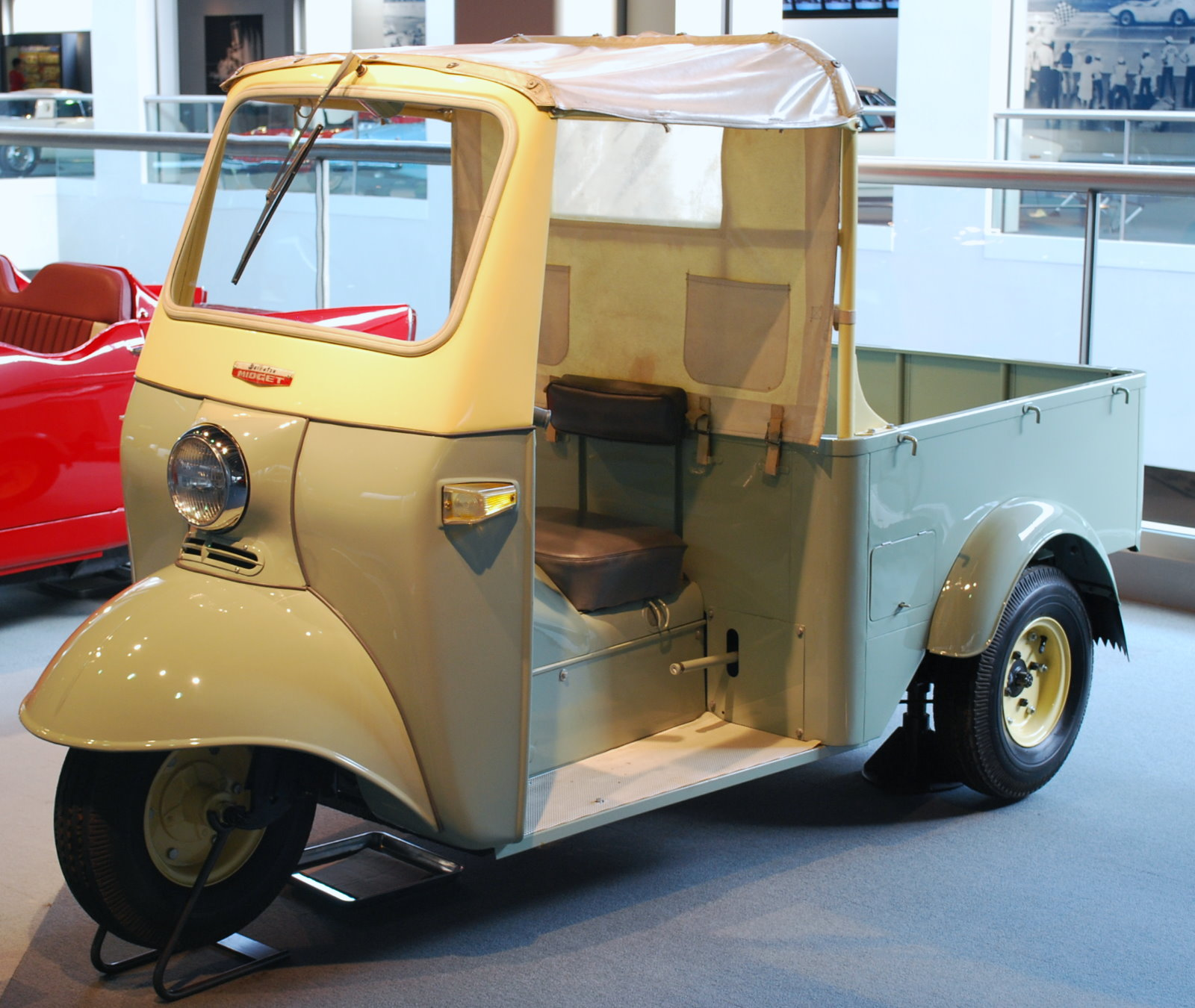
- First generation Daihatsu Midget DKA

Overview
- Manufacturer: Daihatsu
- Production: 1957–1972; 1996–2001
- Assembly: Ikeda Plant, Ikeda, Osaka, Japan

Body and chassis
- Class: Mid-size autorickshaw (1957–1972); Kei truck/Microvan (1996–2001)
- Body style: 2-door truck

The Daihatsu Midget (Japanese: ダイハツ・ミゼット, Hepburn: Daihatsu Mizetto) is a single-seater mini-truck, later a microvan/kei truck made by Japanese automaker Daihatsu. Several distinct vehicles have borne the Midget name over the years, but all have had in common a single or two-seat utilitarian design, with an enclosed or semi-enclosed cab.

== First generation (DK/DS/MP; 1957) ==
=== DK/DS series ===
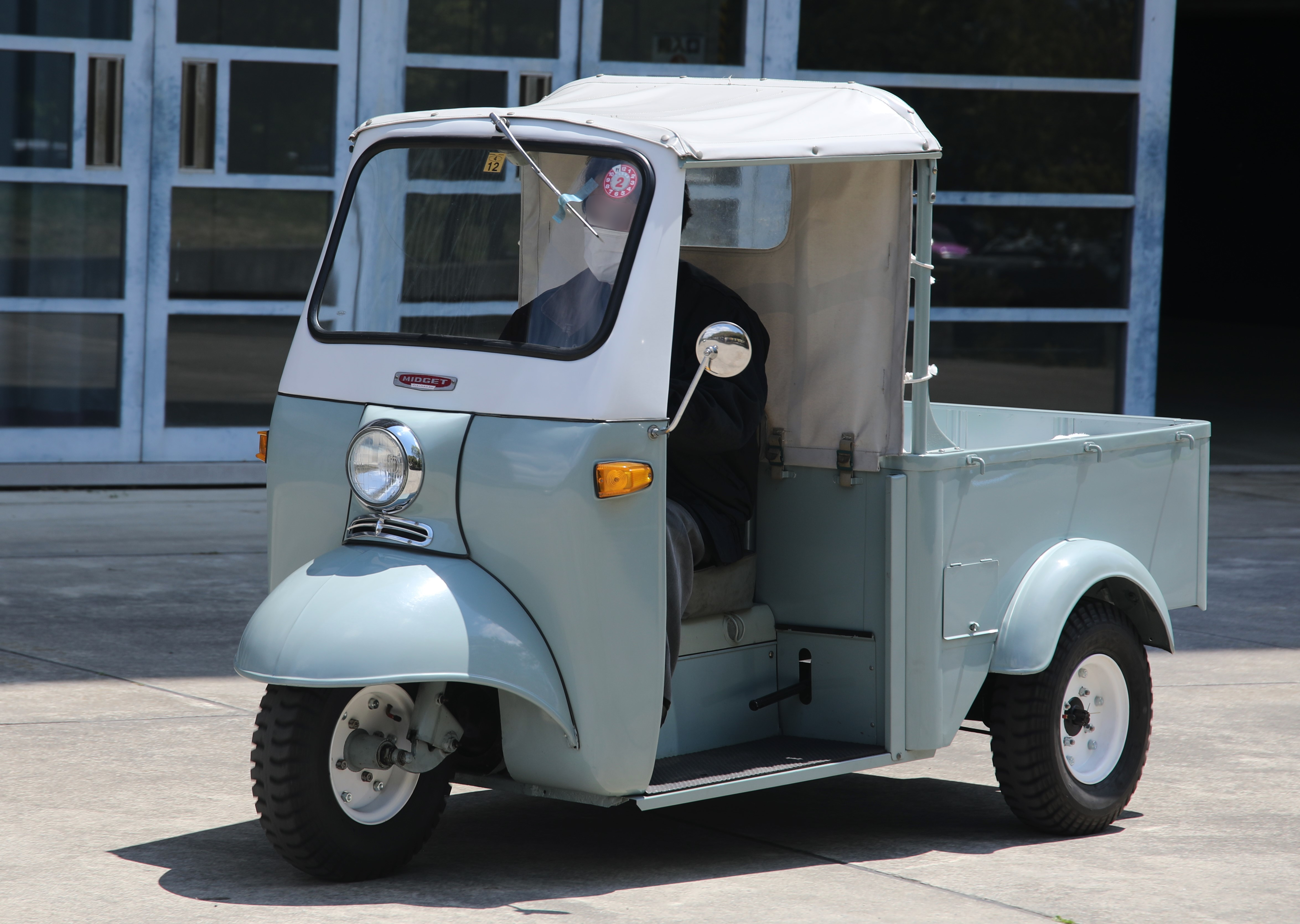
1959 Daihatsu Midget DSA

In August 1957 the original DKA Midget was introduced. It featured three wheels, a single seat, a doorless cab, and handlebar steering. It was equipped with a single-cylinder air-cooled two-stroke engine of 250 cc (ZA) which produced 8 PS (5.9 kW). Beginning in August 1959 it was replaced by the more comfortable DSA, which has doors and a more powerful 10 PS (7.4 kW) version of the ZA engine. Maximum cargo capacity was also increased, from 300 to 350 kg (660 to 770 lb). A DK model appears in My Neighbor Totoro (1988).

There was also a rare two-seat version (DSAP), with the passenger seat offset to the left behind the driver. This required a longer passenger compartment, which encroached on the cargo area. There was also the DSV, a panel van version.

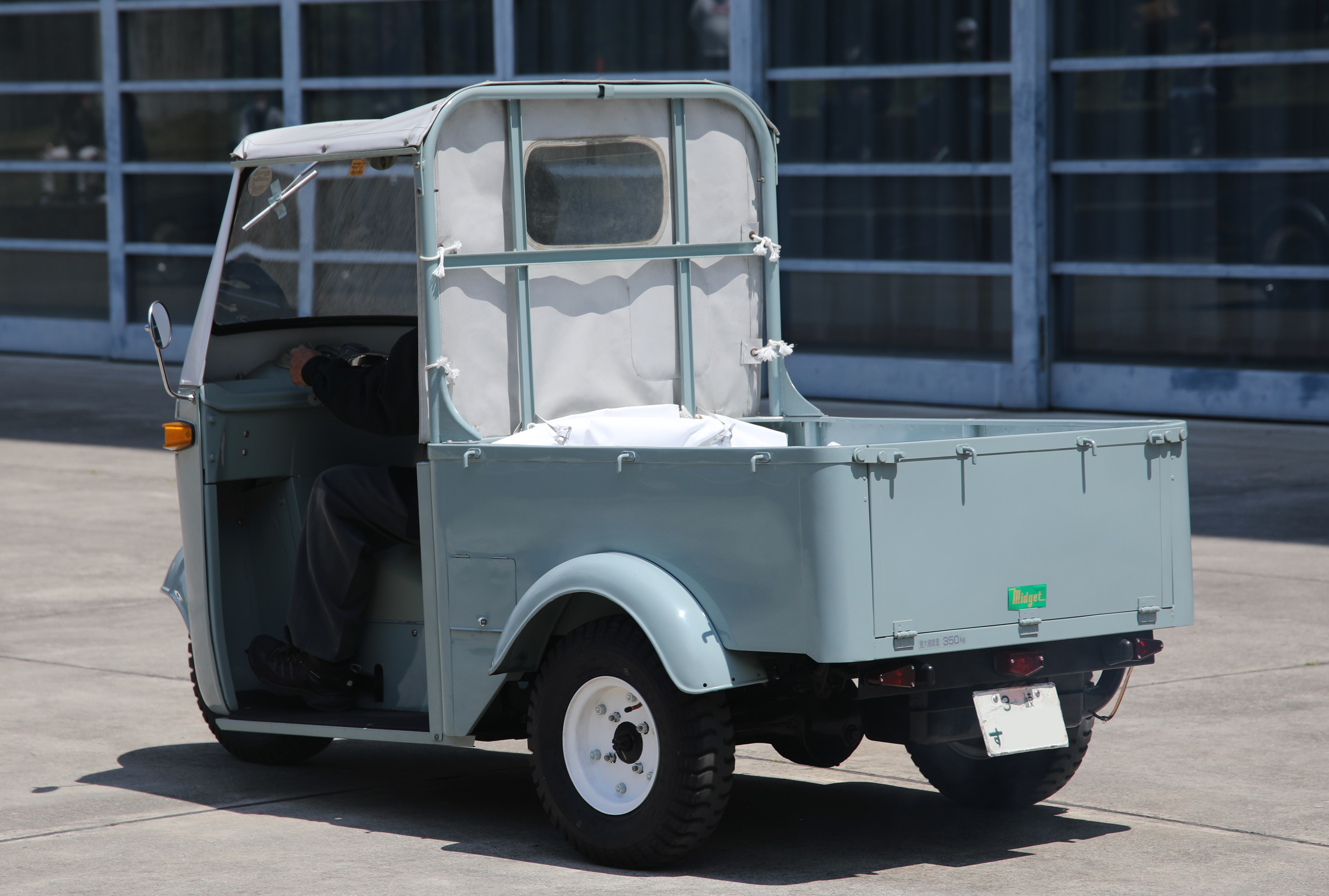
Rear view

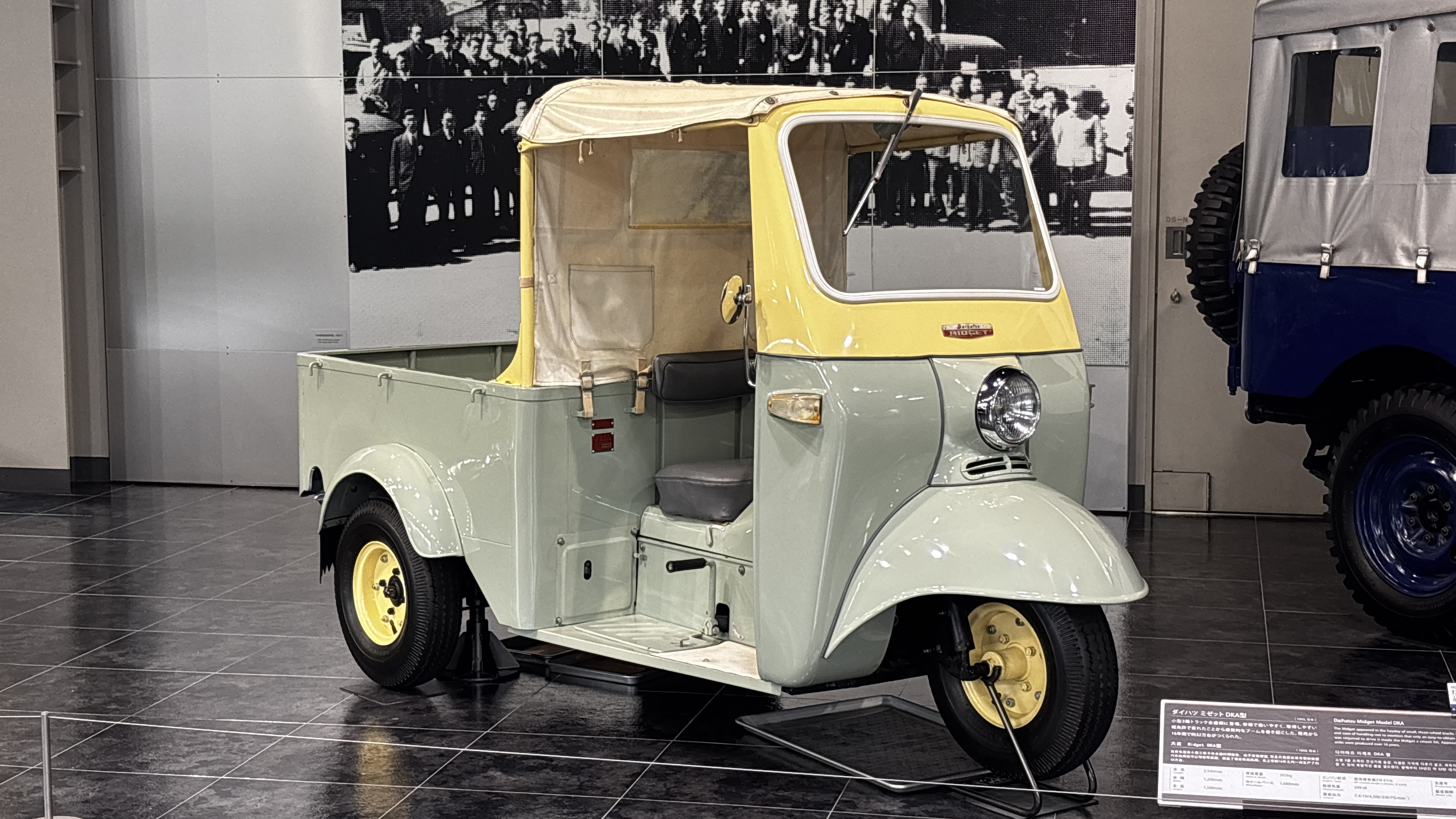
1957–1959 Midget DKA

=== MP series ===
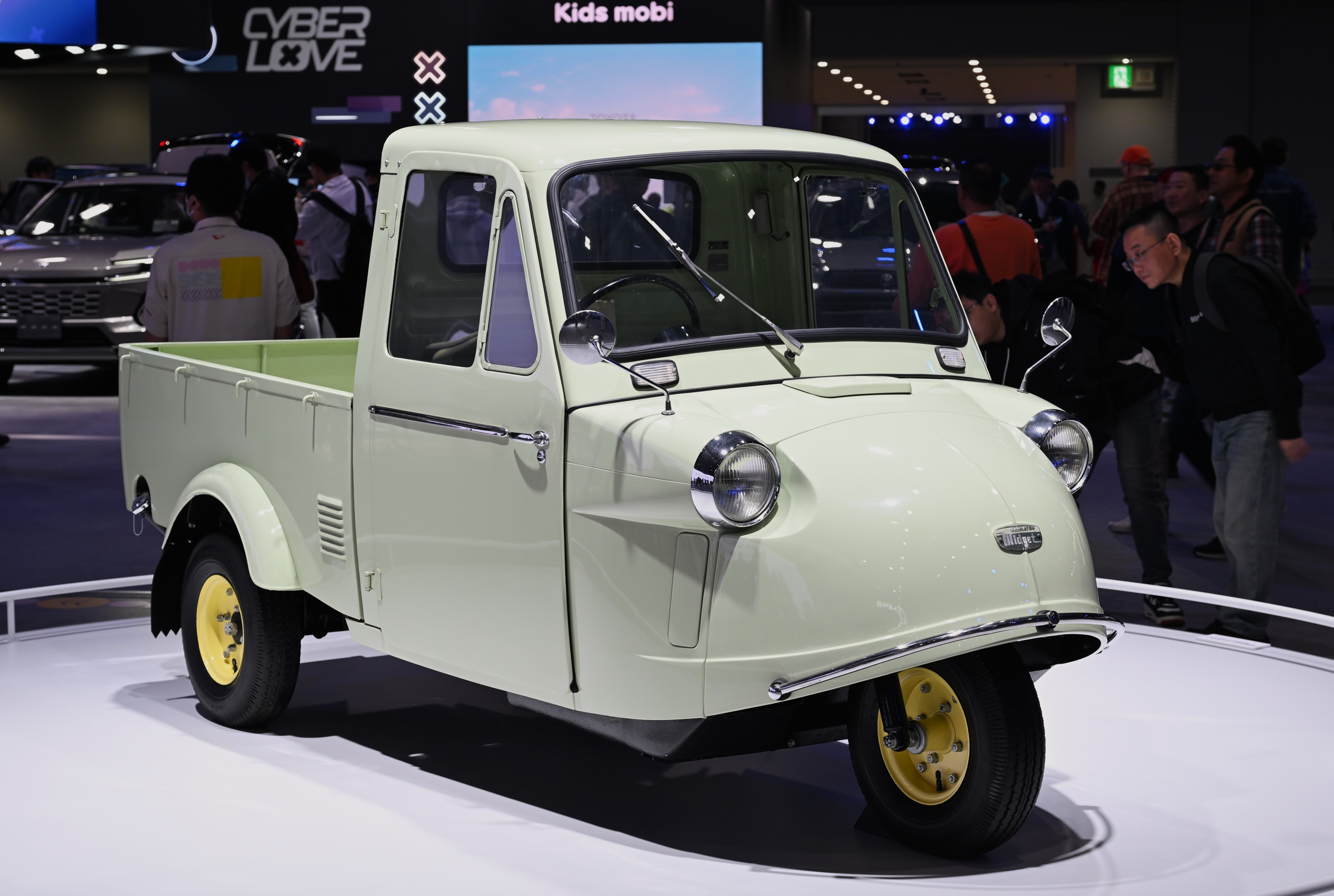
Daihatsu Midget MP5

In October 1959 the MP2 Midget was introduced in Japan - updated with such features as a steering wheel, doors, and seating for two. This model had already been sold in the United States since April 1959, as the MPA, although it was marketed as the "Daihatsu Trimobile". Companies such as Boeing and Lockheed used these little vehicles inside of their plants, for instance. The engine was the same (ZA) air-cooled two-stroke one-cylinder design with 10 PS (7 kW) but an extra 80 kg (180 lb) made for a sluggish vehicle. The DSA continued to be built alongside the more expensive MP variants into the early sixties. There was again a panel van version also available.

Subsequent revisions to the MP design were soon made, resulting in the model MP3 which has the larger ZD engine of 305 cc which produced 12 PS (9 kW). In May 1960 the 200 mm (7.9 in) longer MP4 arrived, featuring roll-up door windows. In August 1961 the doors were modified, now incorporating a triangular vent window and a chromed side strip. In September 1962 the final iteration, the MP5, arrived. It was again somewhat larger than the earlier MP4, with maximum length up to 2,970 mm (117 in) and cargo space increased by 100 mm (3.9 in), to a total of 1,260 mm (50 in). As a matter of fact, nearly all body panels were altered in some way, with new marker lights installed, redesigned doors, a blunter and more rounded front, bigger vent openings in front of the doors' leading edge, and finally a solid metal roof rather than the earlier fabric-covered opening. The MP5 also gained more chrome trim, around the headlamps and elsewhere. April 1963 saw the introduction of automatic oil mixing for the two-stroke engine. In August 1969 new safety regulations required certain lighting changes, a driver's side headrest, and seatbelts. The MP5 remained in production until December 1971, and on sale into 1972.

By 1972, after 336,534 units had been produced, production was terminated because of the falling popularity of three-wheeled models in favor of more modern four-wheeled models.

The Midget I has also been sold outside Japan as the "Bajaj", "Tri-Mobile", or "Bemo" (Bemos in Indonesia are used as autorickshaw share taxis). It is one of the first cars manufactured by the Japanese automaker Daihatsu, known for its low cost, practical vehicles. Thai production began in 1959, with Indonesia, Pakistan, and many other countries soon following. Almost exclusively used as an autorickshaw (or 'tuk-tuk') the Midget was also a well known icon of public transportation in South Asia. Not meant for performance, this narrow vehicle does weave through larger traffic well, despite the fact that it only has three wheels. These original tuk-tuks are a little harder to find in modern times.

In Thailand the Midget MP4 is still in production as a Chinnaraje Midget in Chiang Mai and as a TukTuk Midget MP4 in Bangkok. The facelifted version, known as MP5 is also still manufactured by the TukTuk (Thailand) Co., Ltd. in Bangkok.

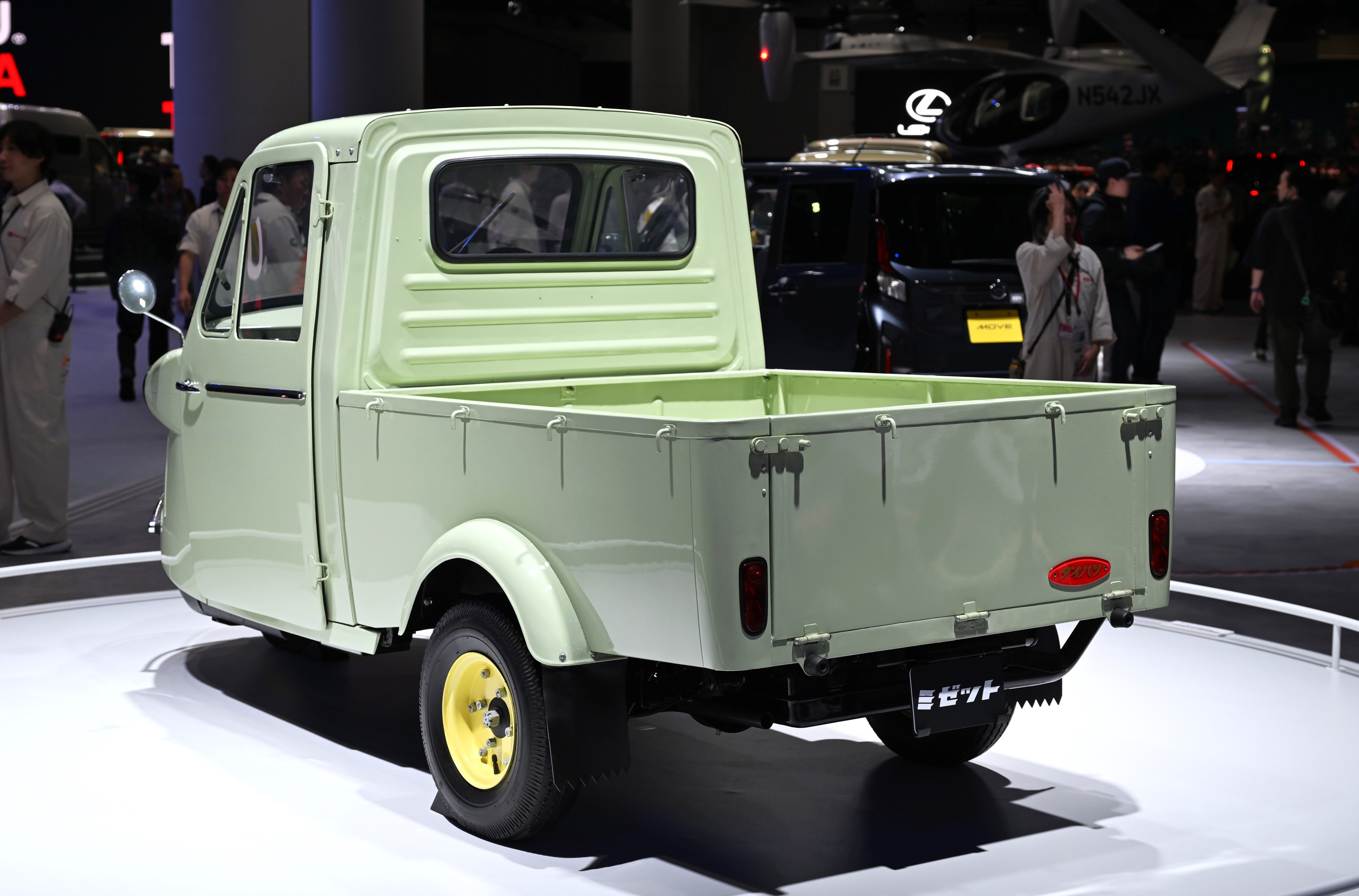
Rear view

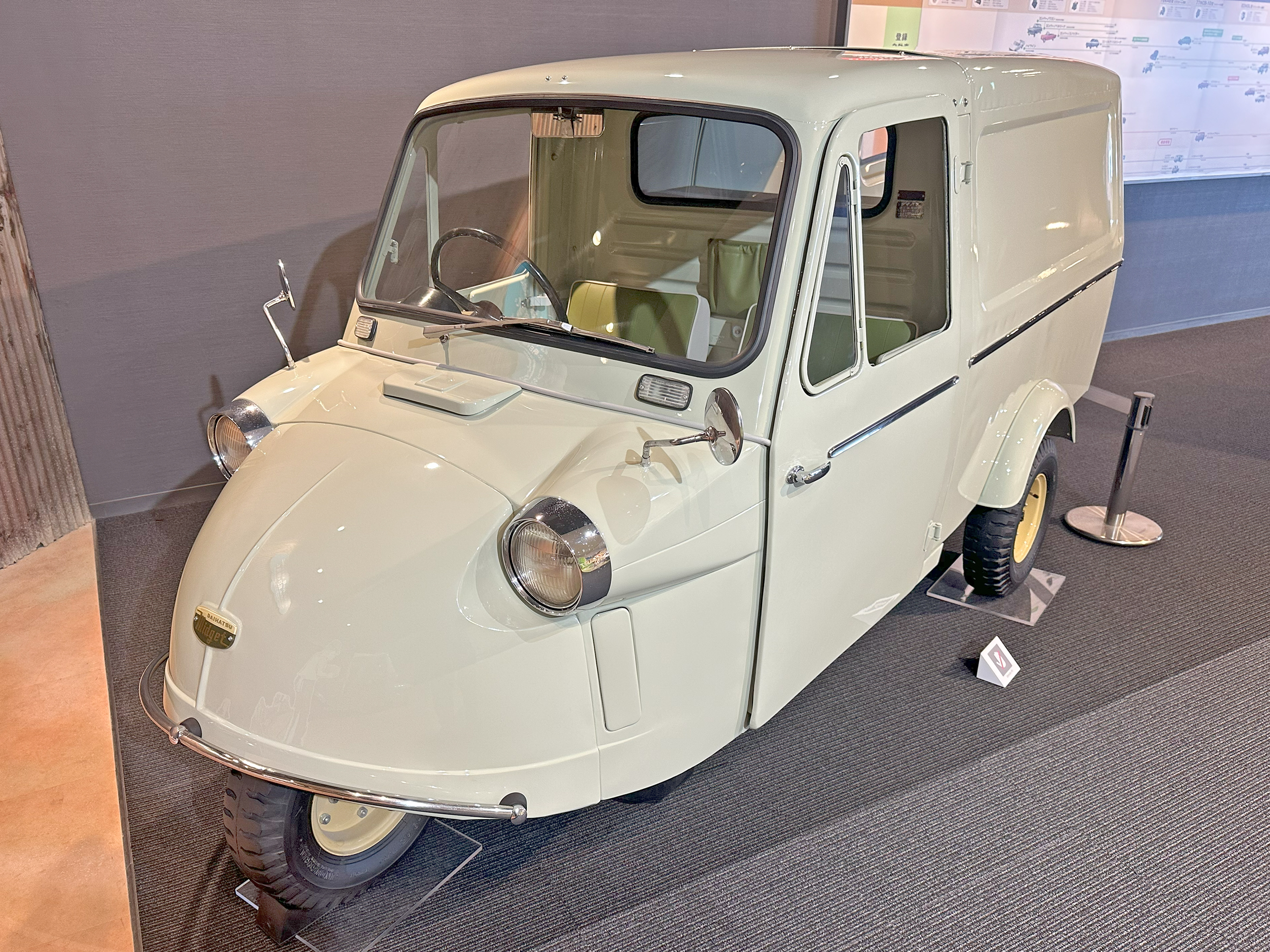
Daihatsu Midget MP5V van

== Second generation (K100; 1996) ==
Second generation (LT30/LT31)
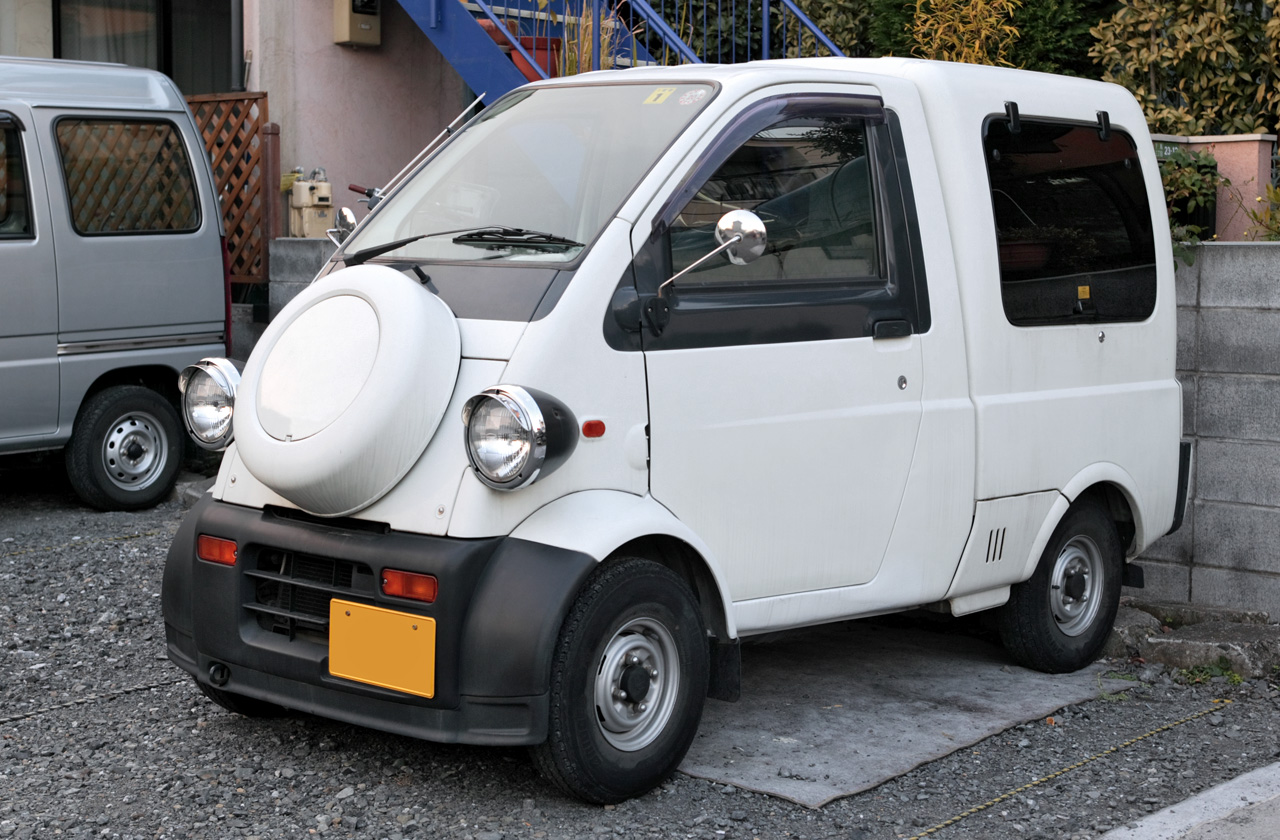
- Daihatsu Midget II Cargo

Overview
- Production: April 1996 – July 2001
- Assembly: Ikeda Plant, Osaka, Japan

Body and chassis
- Body style: kei truck, microvan
- Layout: Front-engine, rear-wheel-drive

Powertrain
- Engine: 659 cc EF-CK I3; 659 cc EF-SE I3
- Transmission: 3-speed automatic

Dimensions
- Wheelbase: 1,840 mm (72.4 in)
- Length: 2,895 mm (114.0 in)
- Width: 1,335 mm (52.6 in)
- Height: 1,650 mm (65.0 in)
- Curb weight: 580 kilograms (1,280 lb)

From 1996 to 2001, Daihatsu manufactured the Midget II pickup and cargo versions. Rear wheel drive is the only available drivetrain. 4WD was not an option. The 1996-September 1999 Midget II is equipped with a carbureated EF-CK 660cc 3 Cylinder that produces 31 horsepower. The September 1999-2001 Midget II is equipped with an electronic fuel injected EF-SE 660cc 3 cylinder that produces 33 horsepower. Available trim levels are the B Type, D Type, R Type and R Type limited. K100P designates as the pickup version, alongside the K100C with designates the cargo version.

Due to its distinctive concept, it is still sometimes featured in local and international media as one of the most unique kei cars, even after production ended.

The Midget II was first introduced as a concept at the 1993 Tokyo Motor Show. They are available in either one or one and a half seater configurations, with a 3 speed automatic or 4 speed manual transmission. EFI versions have an extended front bumper, front spare tire moved to the rear cab, different tail light design, a passenger window crank handle on the pickup as standard, and a steering wheel from the S200P/S210P Hijet. The Midget is often used by owners of bars in Japan, as they are a perfect size to haul around kegs. The design of the Midget is somewhat unusual with the spare tire mounted on the front.

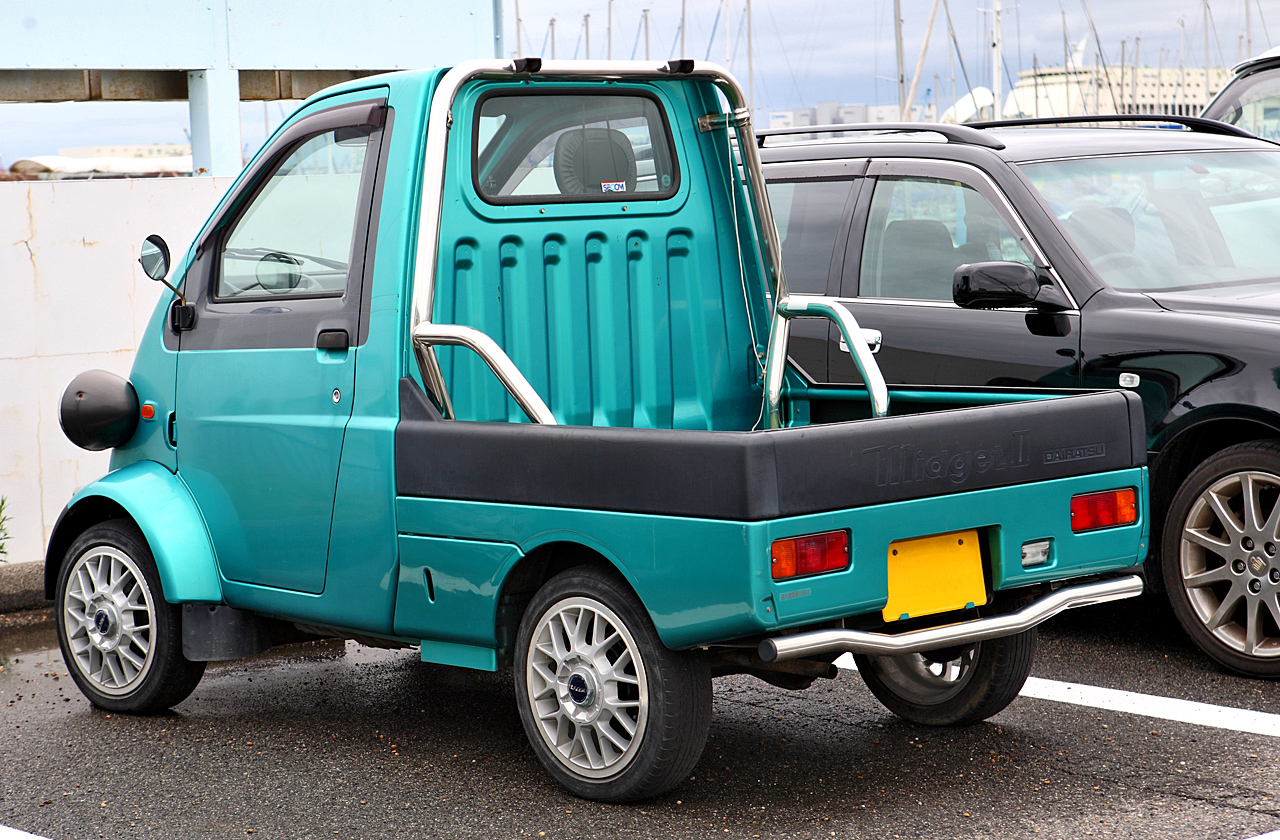
Midget II Truck (aftermarket wheels)

== Midget X concept (2025) ==
The Midget nameplate was used on a battery electric concept named Midget X in 2025.

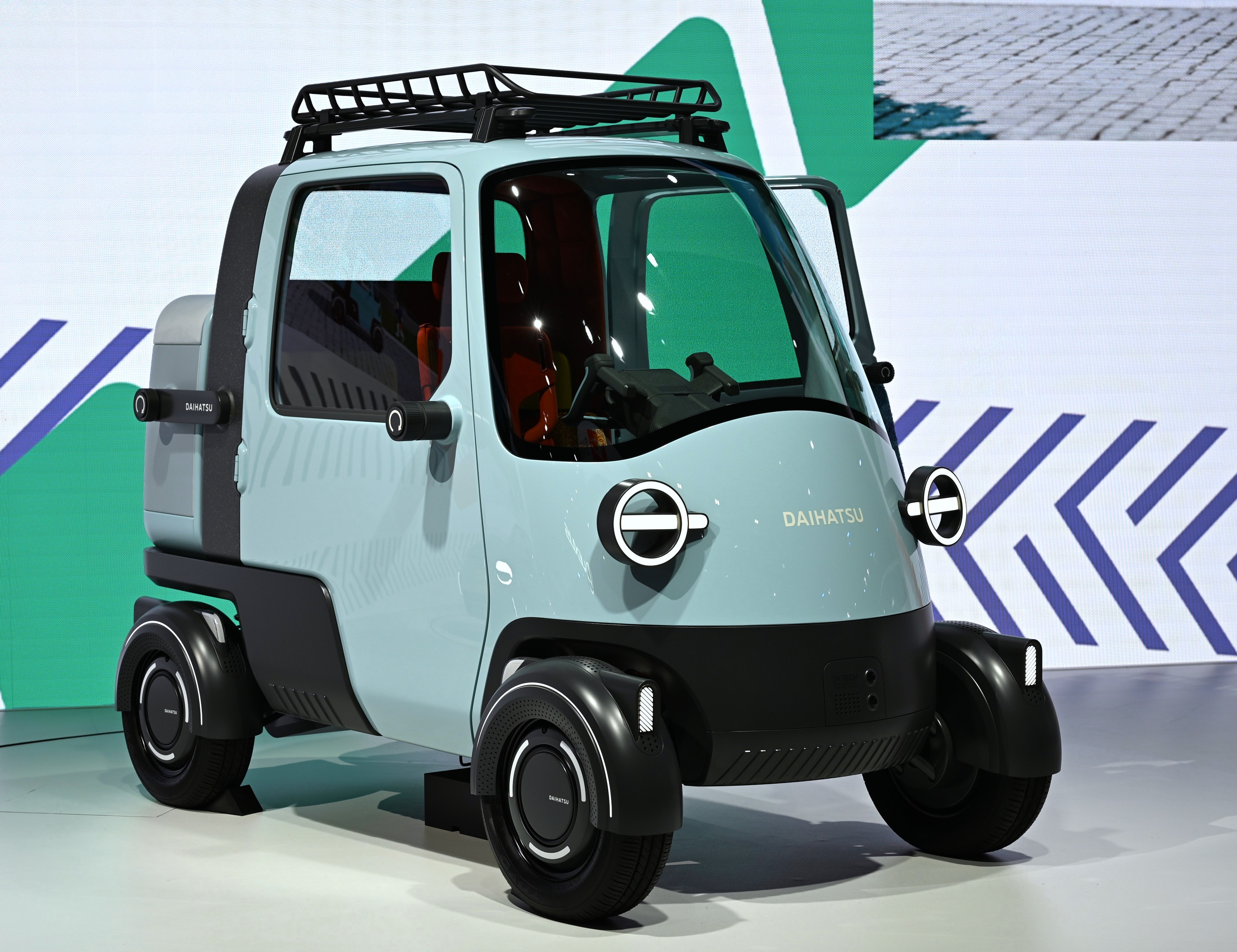
Midget X Concept

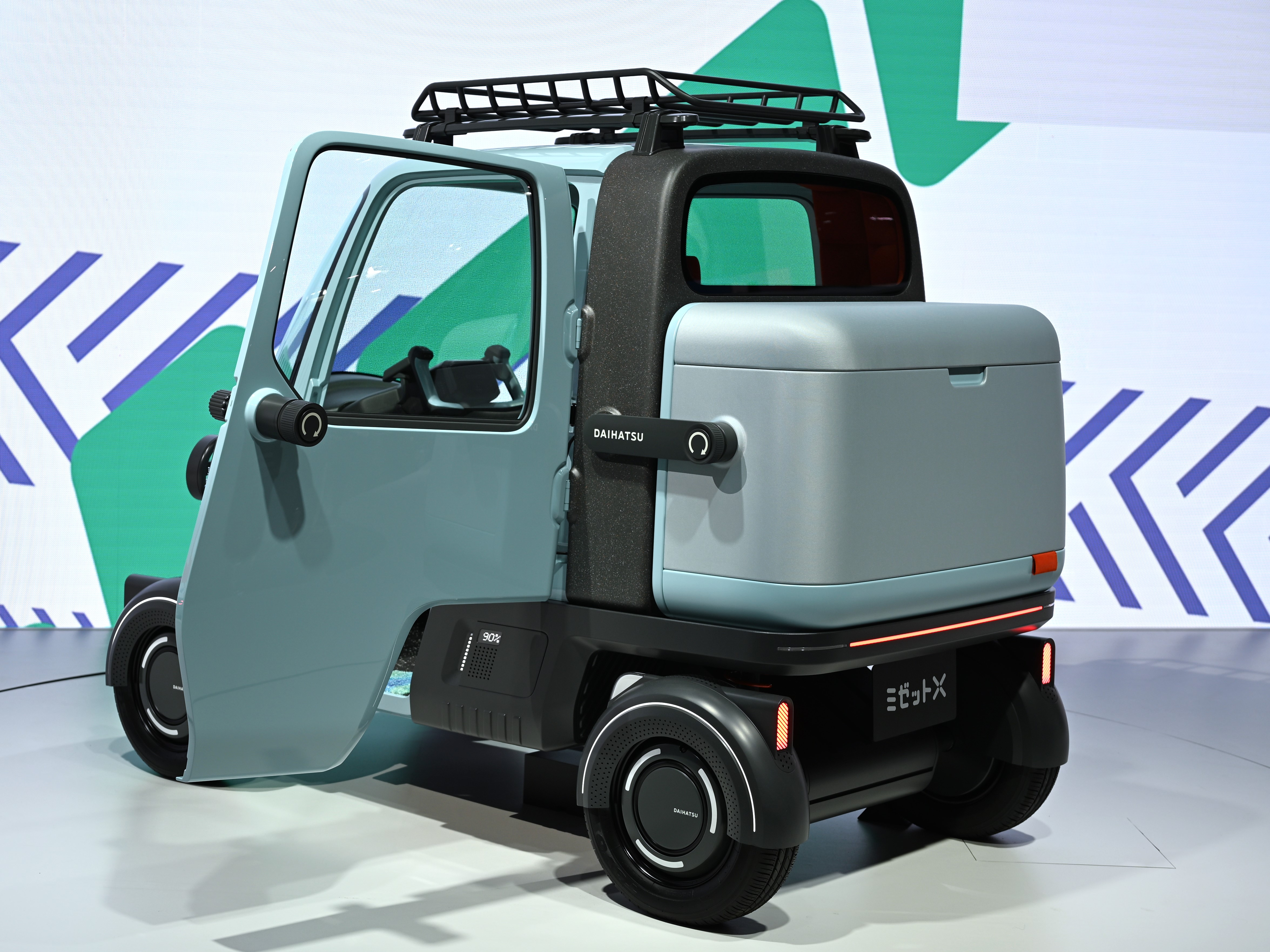
Midget X Concept
