= Daihatsu Bee =

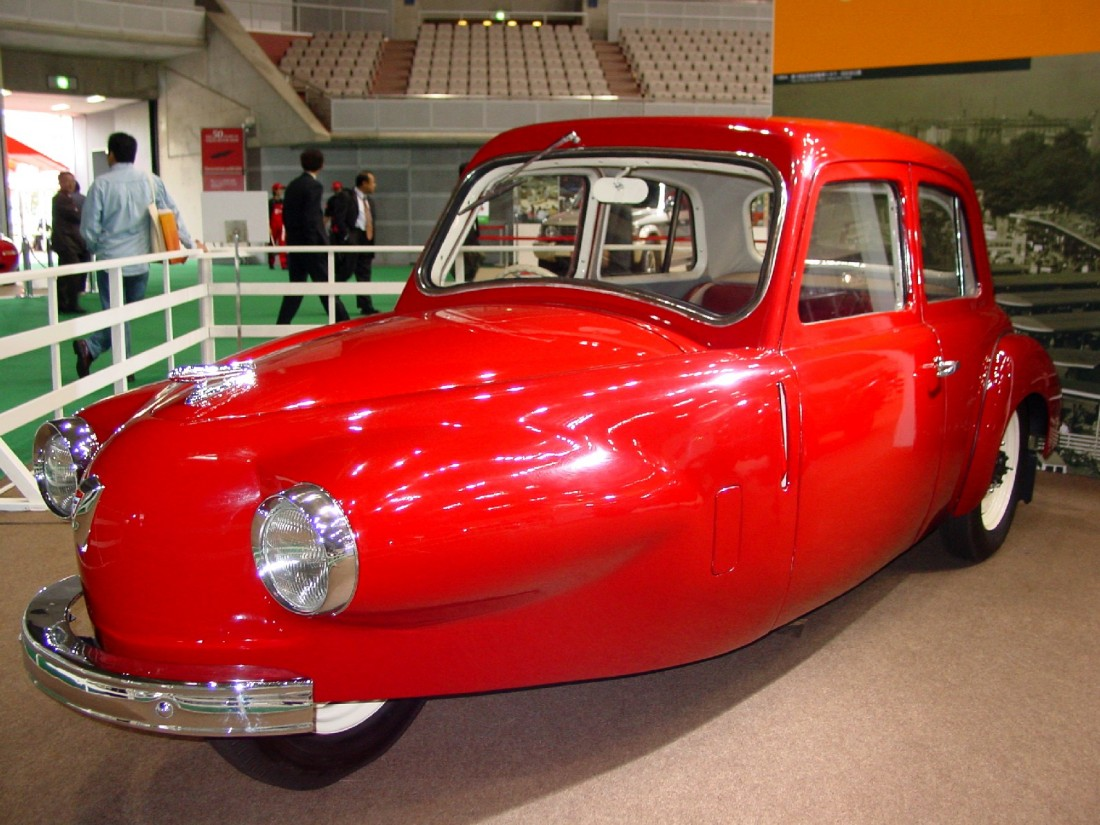

Overview
- Manufacturer: Daihatsu
- Production: 1951–1952
- Assembly: Ikeda, Osaka, Japan

Body and chassis
- Class: Microcar
- Body style: 2-door coupé
- Layout: Rear-engine, rear-wheel-drive

Powertrain
- Engine: 540 & 804 cc 2HA V2 (petrol)

The Daihatsu Bee is a three-wheeled microcar produced by the Japanese automobile manufacturer Daihatsu from 1951 until 1952.

== Overview ==
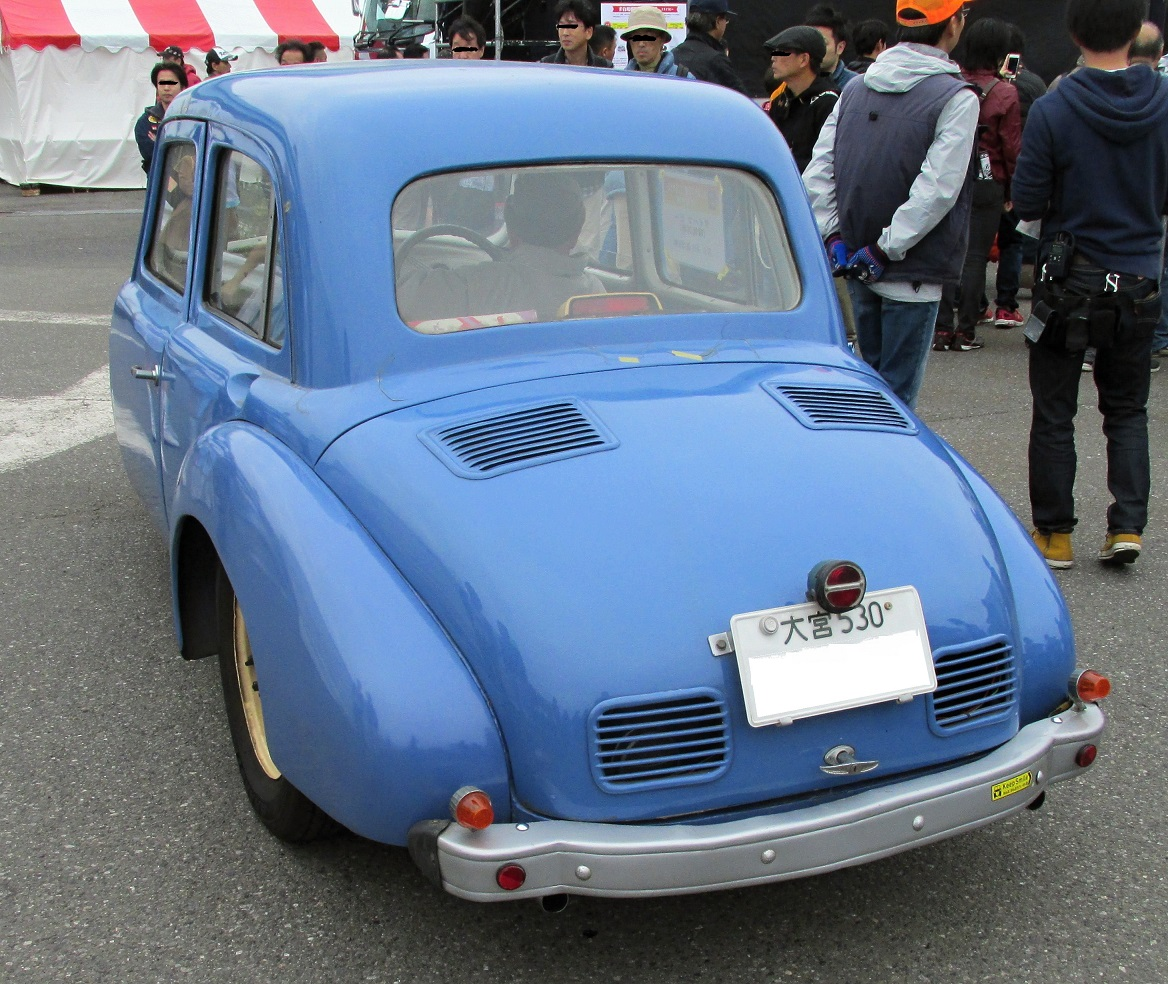
Daihatsu Bee

Although Daihatsu had been producing motorized tricycles for carrying freight since 1930, and had also produced a small car for military use in 1937, the Bee was the first passenger car the company built for sale to the general public. The car was marketed from October 1951, shortly before the company changed its name from 'Hatsudoki Seizo Co' to Daihatsu. The Bee's model code is PCA.

The car had a two-door fibreglass, saloon body, and was popular as a taxi in Japan where licensing regulations permitted a lower charge per mile for three wheel vehicles than for four. Power was provided by a rear-mounted 540 cc OHV air-cooled two-cylinder four-stroke engine. It was the first car in Japan with a horizontally opposed engine. The car was adapted from one of Daihatsu's three-wheeled delivery trucks. It sold very poorly, production was highly labor-intensive and ceased after only approximately 300 units were built.
