= Daihatsu V series =

Overview
- Manufacturer: Daihatsu
- Production: 1958–1970
- Assembly: Ikeda, Osaka, Japan

Body and chassis
- Class: Medium truck
- Body style: 2-door cab over pickup truck
- Related: Daihatsu Light Bus

Powertrain
- Engine: Petrol: 1477 cc GOB V2 (Vesta); 1490 cc FA I4 (V100/150/200); 1861 cc FB I4 (V200); 2433 cc FD I4 (V300); Diesel: 2270 cc DE I4 (D200); 2530 cc DG I4 (D300)
- Transmission: 4-speed manual

Dimensions
- Wheelbase: 2,500 mm (98.4 in) (V100)
- Length: 4,250 mm (167.3 in) (V100); 4,660 mm (183.5 in) (Vesta/V200)
- Width: 1,690 mm (66.5 in) (Vesta/V100/200)
- Height: 1,975 mm (77.8 in) (Vesta/V100/200)
- Curb weight: 1,315 kg (2,899 lb) (V100)

Chronology
- Successor: Daihatsu Delta

The Daihatsu V series (Japanese: ダイハツ・Vシリーズ) is a series of cab over trucks, manufactured from 1958 to 1970. The V series was Daihatsu first four-wheeled vehicle since the Hatsudoki FA truck in 1937 (Daihatsu's former company name). The V series' main rivals in the medium-weight four-wheel truck segment were Toyota Dyna, Nissan Caball, Isuzu Elf, Prince Homer and Mazda D-Series.

The first Daihatsu V series truck was known as the Daihatsu Vesta. This 2-ton class truck was released in 1958, competing in the same weight class as Daihatsu's own RKO three-wheeler truck. The engine was a 53 PS (39 kW) 1.5 L v-twin engine shared with the Daihatsu RKO. In 1960, the engine was replaced with a new 68 PS (50 kW) 1.5 L FA inline-four engine and renamed to Daihatsu V200. In 1962, the displacement was increased to 1.9 L FB, the power also increased to 80 PS (59 kW) and a new 63 PS (46 kW) 2.3 L DE diesel engine was added; this diesel model was marketed as the Daihatsu D200

In 1964, a smaller 1.25-ton class was added with the 1.5 L FA engine, known as Daihatsu V100. This was followed by the 3-ton class Daihatsu V300 with the 95 PS (70 kW) 2.4 L FD petrol engine and the Daihatsu D300 with the 72 PS (53 kW) 2.5 L DG diesel engine.

In 1968, two new models were available, 1-ton and 1.5-ton class. This new 1-ton model also used the V100 name as did the 1.25-tonner, which caused some confusion in the market. The 1.5-ton was known as Daihatsu V150 and was also powered by the 1.5 L FA engine.

There was also medium-sized bus series based from V series truck chassis, known as the Daihatsu Light Bus.

In October 1970, as a result of the business agreement with Toyota in 1967, the V series was replaced by the Toyota Dyna-based Daihatsu Delta.
