= Daihatsu Delta =

Automotive nameplate by Daihatsu

Overview
- Also called: Toyota Dyna (1970–2003); Toyota LiteAce (1970–1982); Toyota TownAce (1978–2001); Hino Dutro (1999–2003)
- Production: 1970–2001 (Japan); 2005–2010 (Colombia)
- Assembly: Japan: Ikeda, Osaka (Ikeda plant); Malaysia: Shah Alam, Selangor (ASSB); Indonesia: Sunter, Jakarta (ADM); Colombia: Envigado (Sofasa); Philippines: Manila (DMC); China: Zhanjiang, Guangdong (Zhanjiang Sanxing Motors)

Body and chassis
- Class: Medium-duty truck
- Layout: Front-engine, rear-wheel-drive Front-engine, four-wheel-drive

Chronology
- Successor: Daihatsu Atrai 7/Hijet Grancargo (van); Daihatsu Gran Max (van/truck, indirect)

The Daihatsu Delta, is an automotive nameplate that has been used on a variety of Japanese automaker Daihatsu trucks and vans between 1970 and 2010. They have usually been Toyota-based, and otherwise based on models from the Toyota-owned Hino Motors. The trucks have utilized a cab over engine or mid-engine design. Typically fitted with Toyota engines, a few versions, particularly diesels, received Daihatsu's own engines. The Delta badge was retired in Japan in 2003, but continued to be used on models built locally in other markets until 2010.

== Medium-duty truck ==
Set to replace the old Daihatsu V series cab over medium trucks, between October 1970 and 2003 (2010 outside Japan), Daihatsu retailed the Delta and Delta 1500/2000—a rebadged Toyota Dyna. Five generations were constructed, with new models released in 1977, 1984, 1995 and 1999.

While the third generation Delta finished production for the Japanese market in 1995, it continued in production until 2006 for many markets, including South America, Australia and New Zealand.

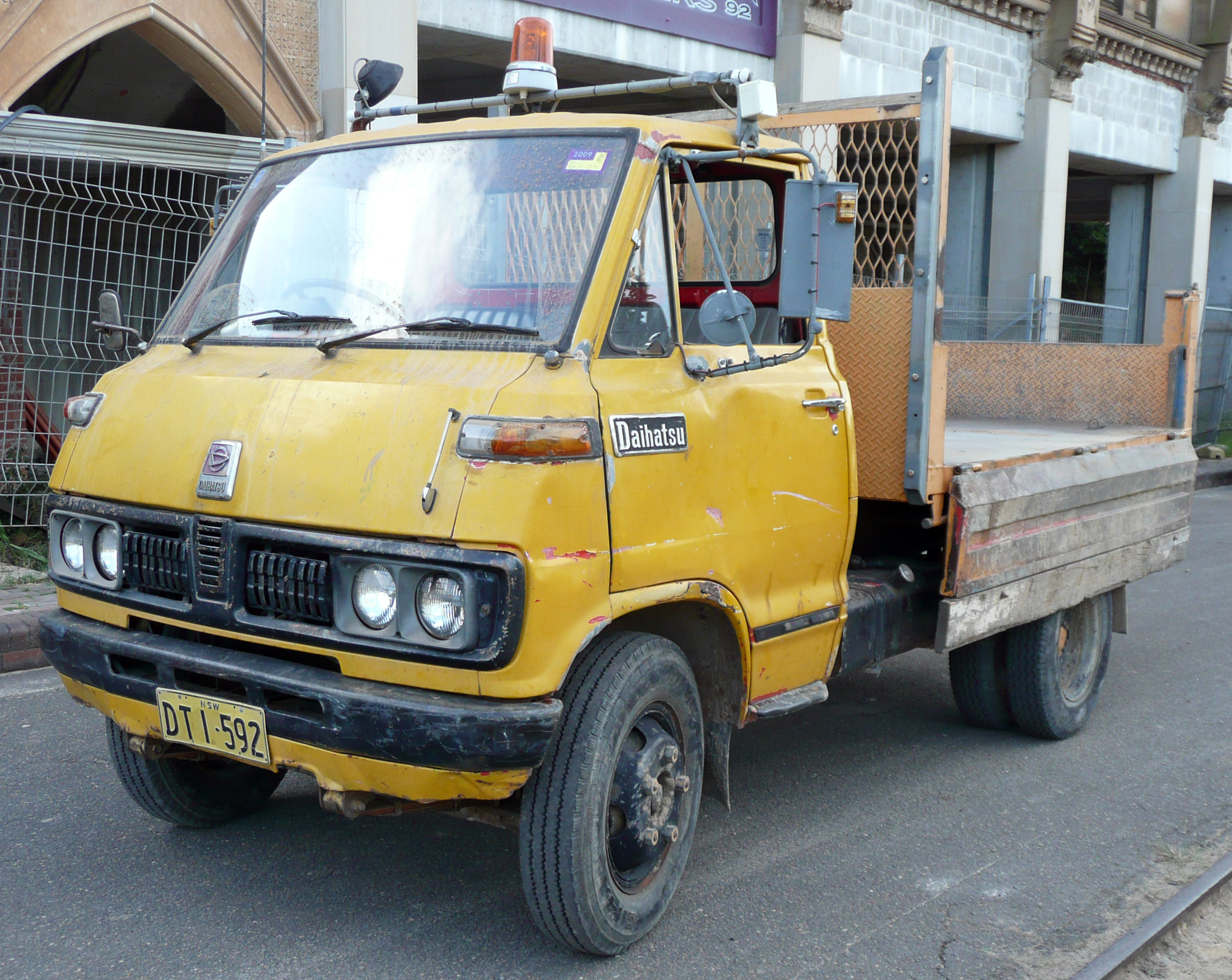
First generation (1970–1977)

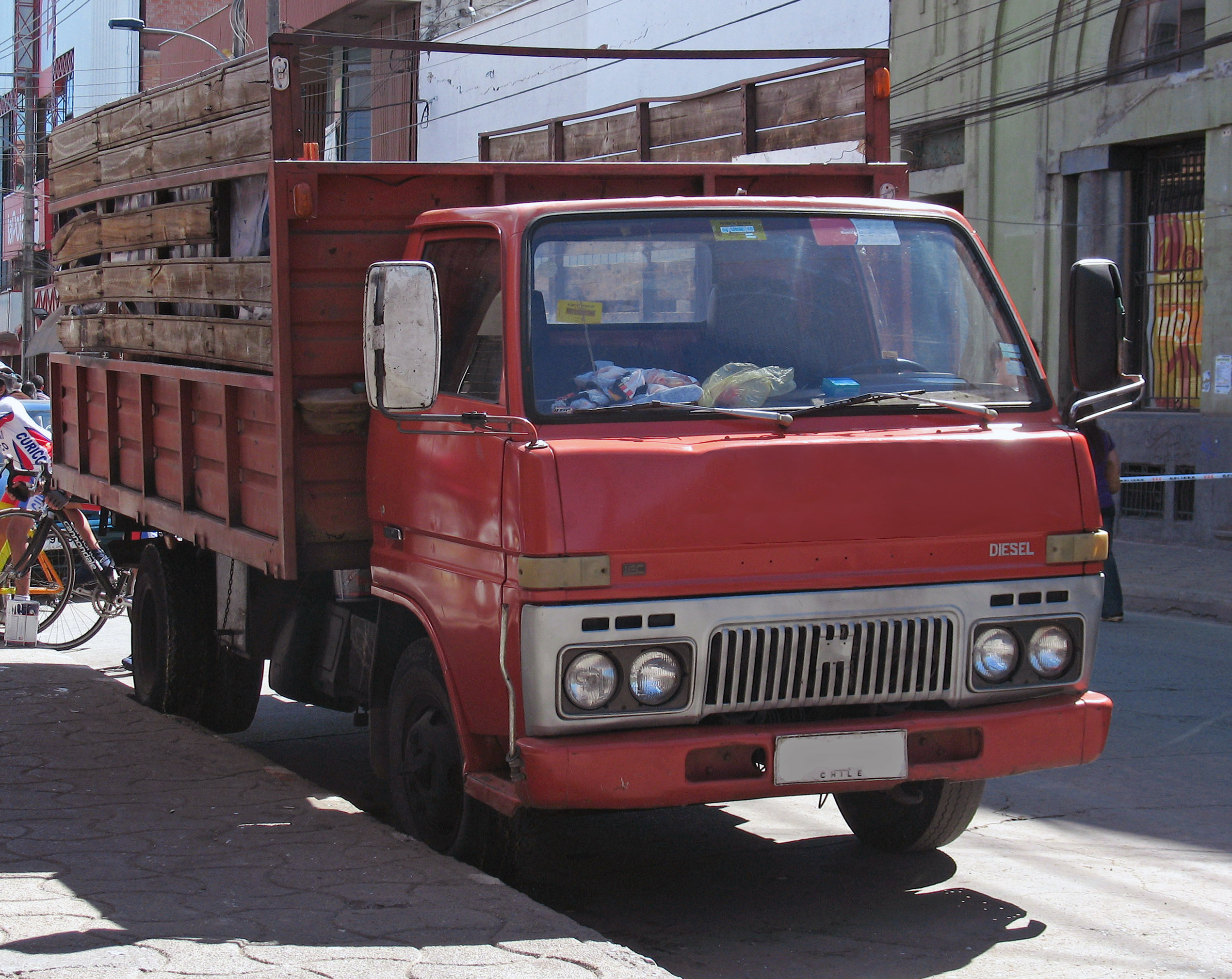
Second generation (1977–1983)

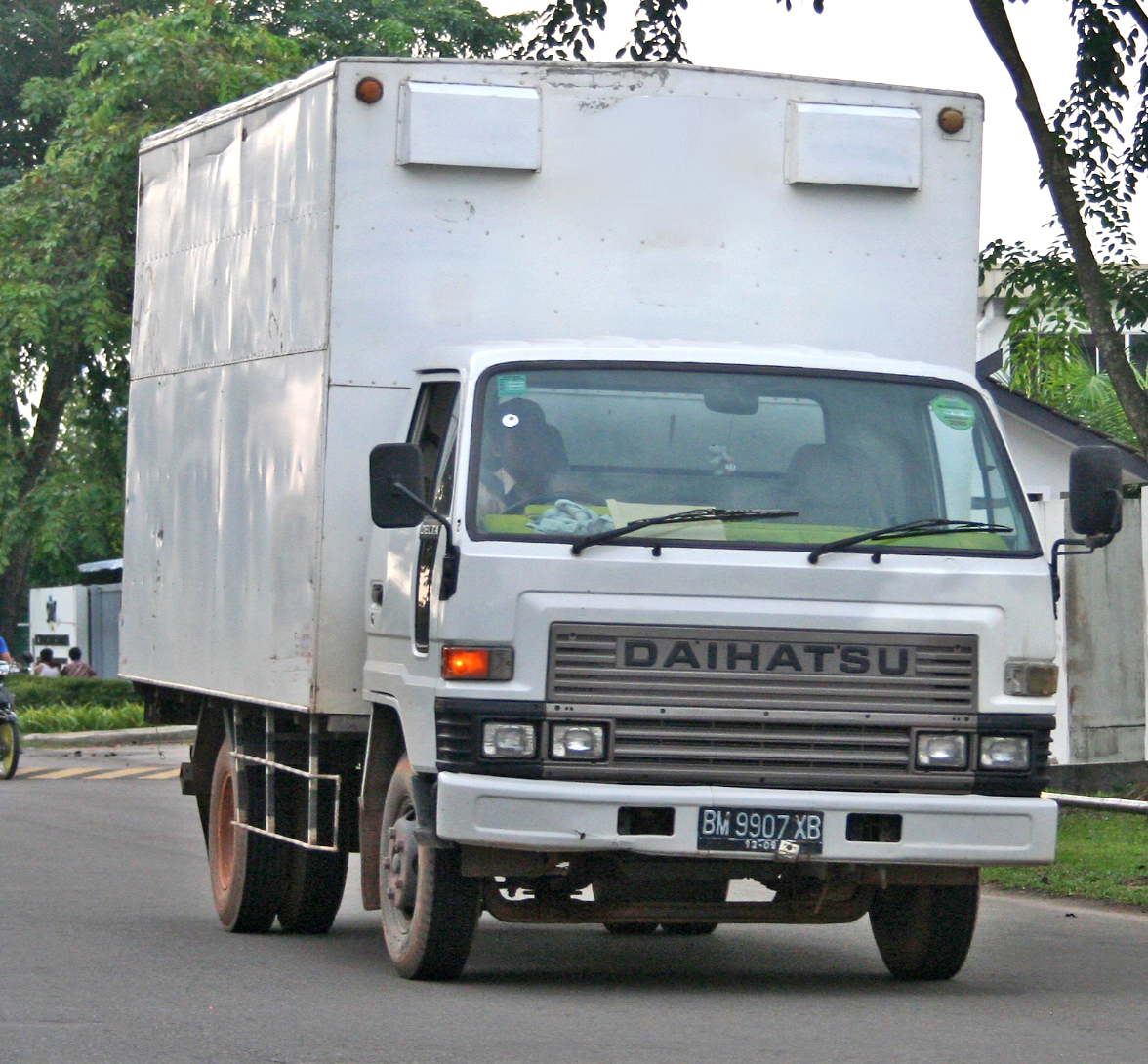
Third generation (1984–1995)

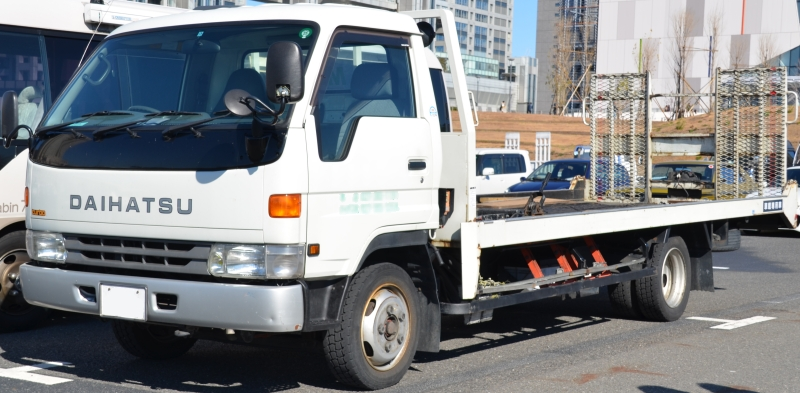
Fourth generation (1995–1999)

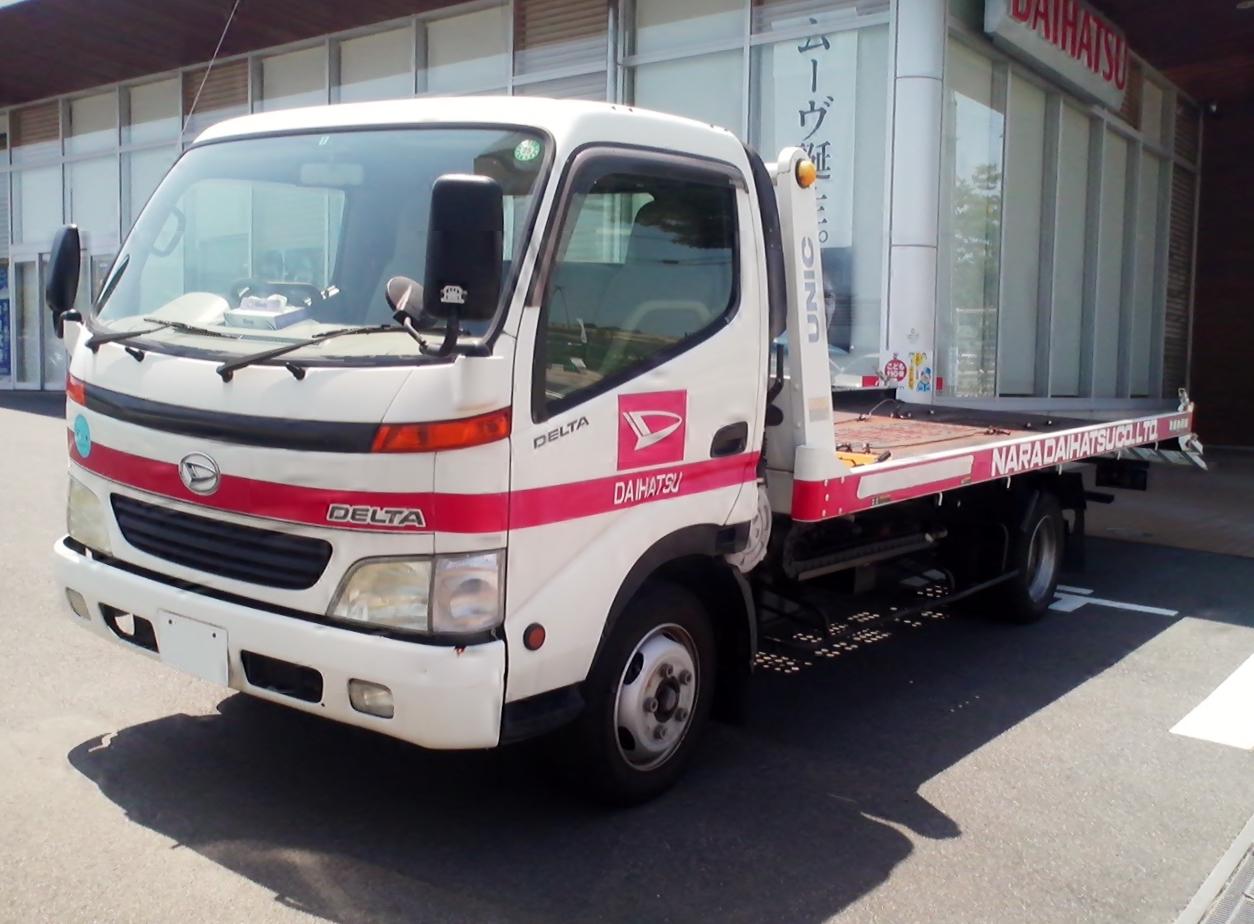
Fifth generation (1999–2003)

== Light-duty truck ==
Following the medium-duty trucks were the light-duty Delta 750 trucks released in March 1971 (D10 series)—rebadged Toyota LiteAce trucks. Second generation versions arrived in October 1979 (D20 series), surviving until October 1982.

1971–1979 Delta 750 (D10)

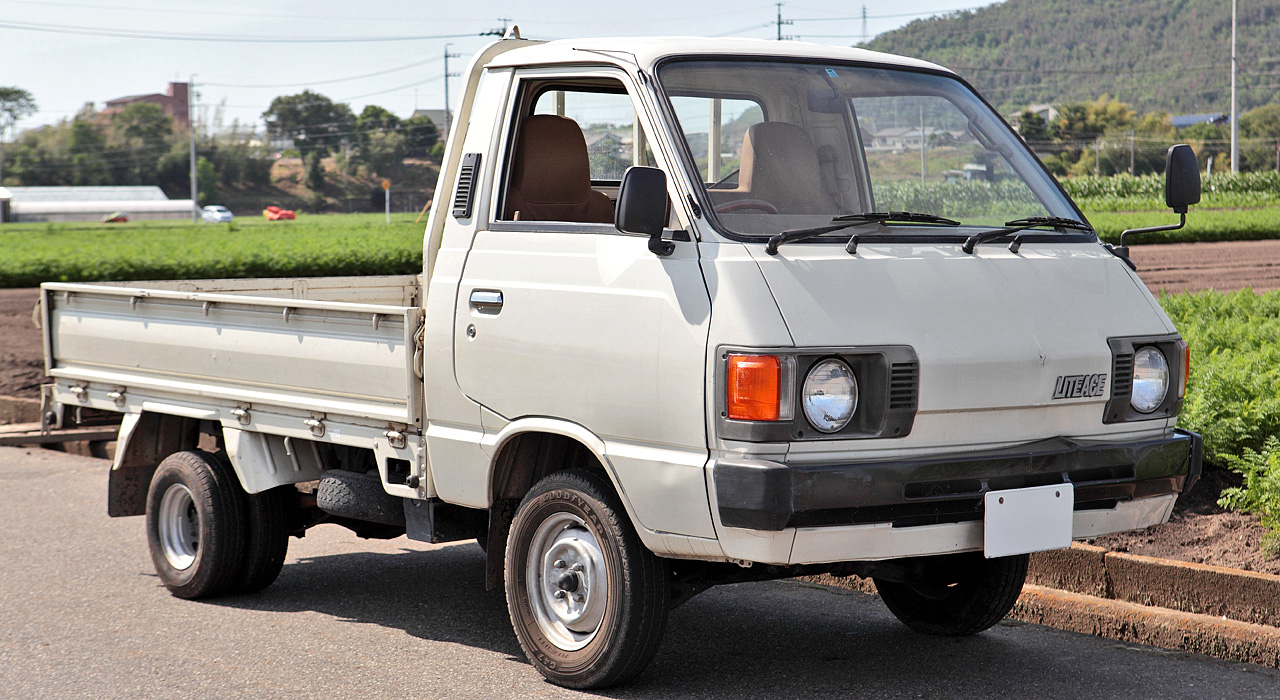
1979–1982 Delta 750 (D20)

== Van ==
Daihatsu released a cargo van and passenger wagon model named Delta Wide Van/Wagon in November 1976 (B10 series)—a rebadged Toyota TownAce. The second generation (B20 series) was released in November 1982 and was rebodied for January 1992, maintaining existing mechanicals. Third generation models (R40/R50 series) arrived in October 1996—now badged Delta Van/Wagon and continued on until November 2001.

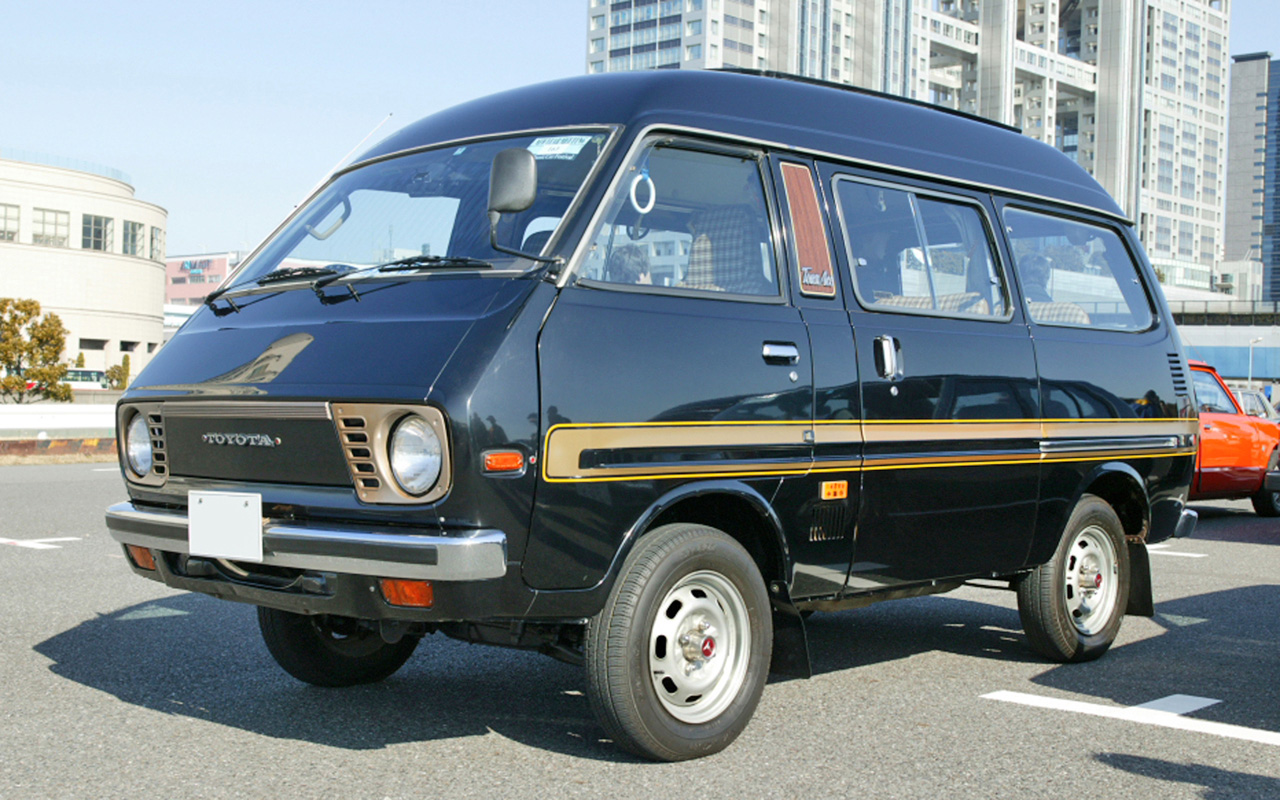
1976–1982 Delta Wide (B10)

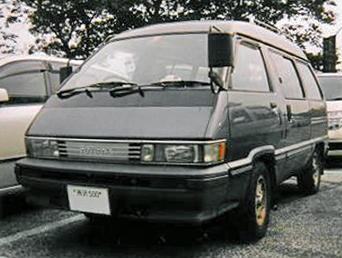
1982–1991 Delta Wide (B20)

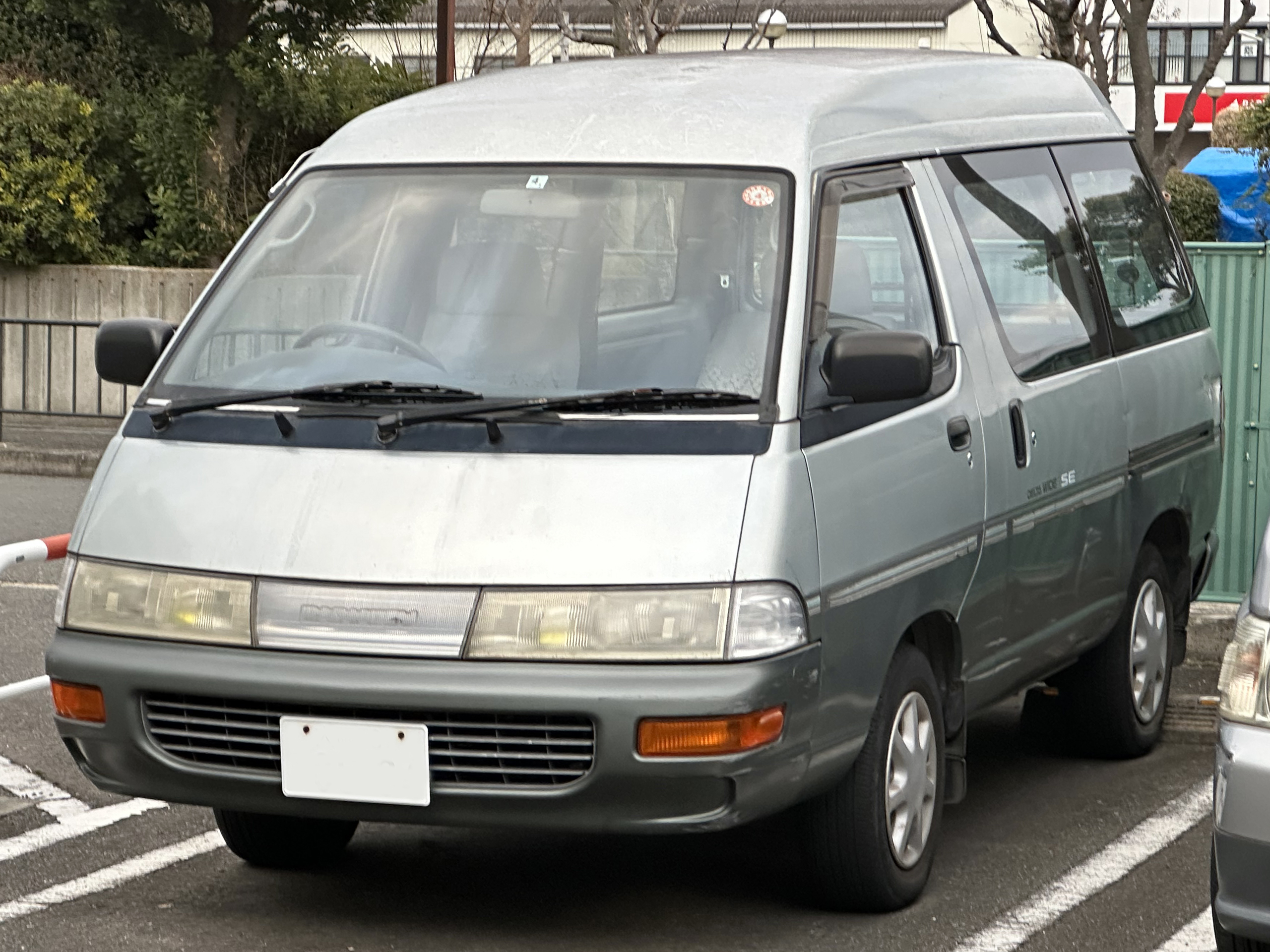
1992–1996 Delta Wide (B20/B30)

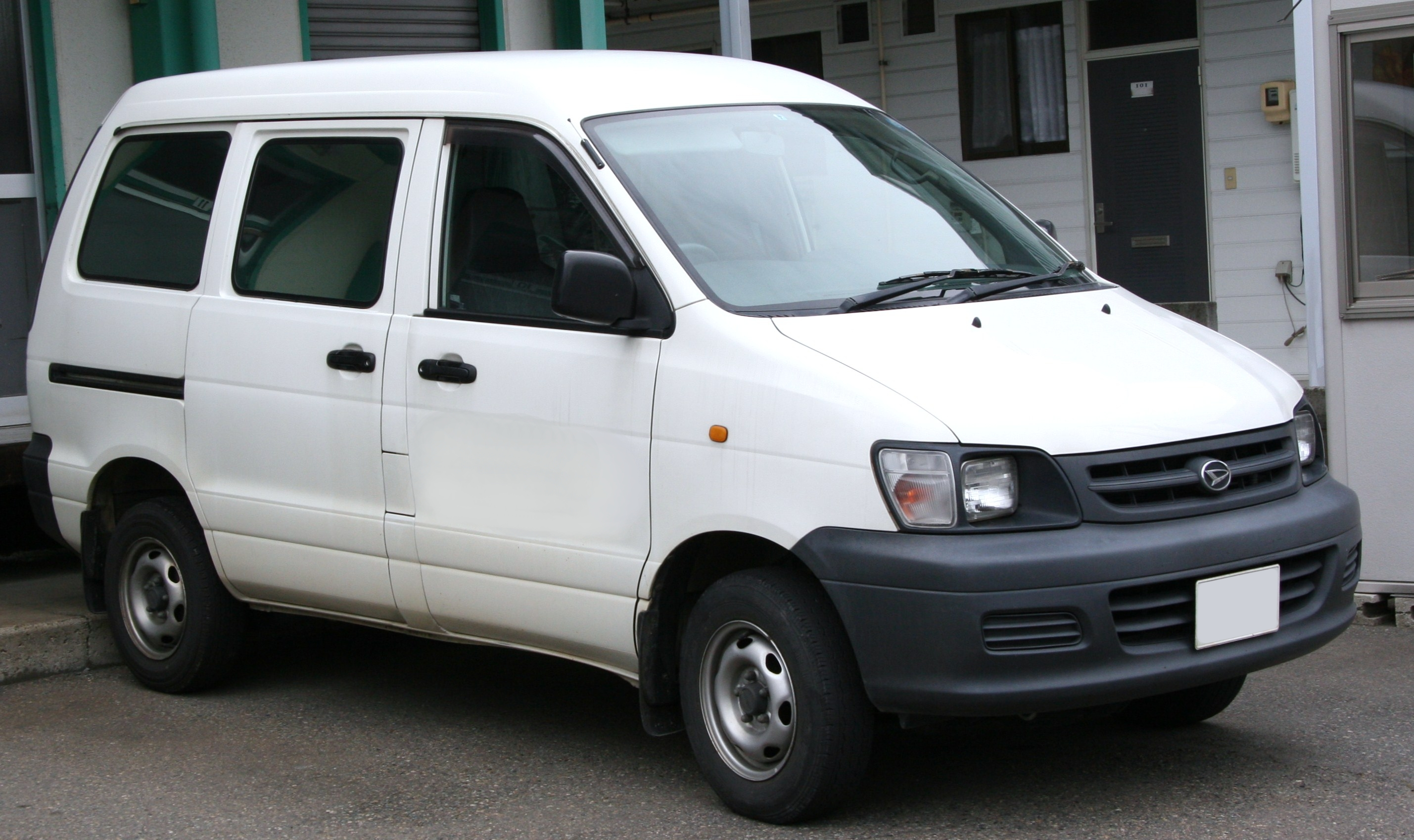
1996–2001 Delta (R40/R50)
