= Daihatsu Compagno =

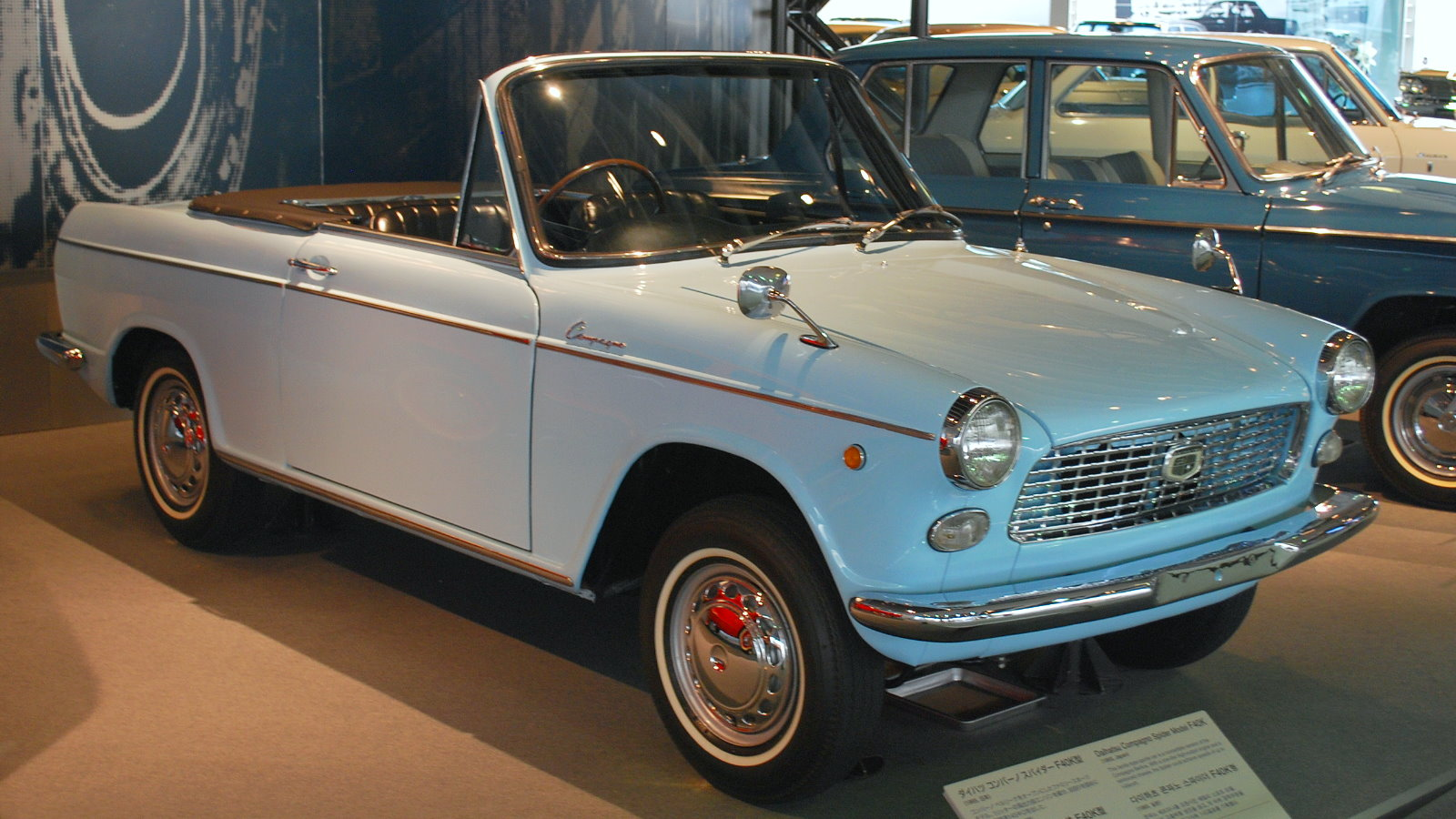
- 1965 Daihatsu Compagno Spider

Overview
- Manufacturer: Daihatsu
- Production: 1963–1970
- Assembly: Ikeda, Osaka, Japan
- Designer: Vignale

Body and chassis
- Class: compact
- Body style: 2/4-door sedan; 3-door van; 2-door pickup truck; 2-door cabriolet
- Layout: Front-engine, rear-wheel-drive

Powertrain
- Engine: 797 cc FC I4; 958 cc FE I4
- Transmission: 4-speed manual; 2-speed automatic

Dimensions
- Wheelbase: 2,220 mm (87.4 in); 2,280 mm (89.8 in) - 4-door sedan
- Length: 3,800 mm (149.6 in)
- Width: 1,425 mm (56.1 in)
- Height: 1,430 mm (56.3 in)
- Curb weight: 765 kg (1,687 lb)

Chronology
- Successor: Daihatsu Consorte

The Daihatsu Compagno is an automobile which was produced by Daihatsu in Japan from 1963 to 1970. The name comes from the Italian word for "partner." The Compagno was designed to be offered in multiple bodystyles, and was introduced prior to the acquisition of Daihatsu by Toyota in 1967. The Compagno was available as a two-door sedan, four-door sedan, two-door pickup truck, a three-door delivery van and a convertible. The first Compagno prototype was shown at the 1961 Tokyo Motor Show, with an appearance reminiscent of the Fiat 1800/2100. This was not a very well balanced design and Vignale's production version ended up looking quite different. The Compagno used a ladder-type chassis instead of the more modern monocoque style, with torsion bar wishbone suspension at the front and semi-elliptical leaf springs for the rear axle. The Compagno is also the first Daihatsu car to use the famous "D" logo.

== History ==
From 1963 to 1970, 120,000 Daihatsu Compagnos were produced. The first model introduced, in April 1963, was the Compagno Light Van light commercial vehicle (F30V). It was available in Standard or Deluxe trim. Two months later the Compagno Wagon (F30) followed, a pricier and more comfortable and passenger oriented version. This cost over twenty per cent more than the Standard Light Van and was Daihatsu's first four-wheeled passenger car. In November 1963 the Japanese-designed two-door saloon appeared, called "Berlina" and with the F30 chassis code. This was available in either Standard and Deluxe trim, priced close to their Light Van and Wagon counterparts. The Deluxe had an Italianate dashboard, reflecting Vignale's input, complete with three-spoke Nardi steering wheel.

To celebrate the 1964 Tokyo Olympics, Daihatsu used two Compagnos and a New line in a PR stunt, driving the 18,000 km (11,000 mi) from the Olympic flame in Olympia, Greece to Tokyo in a little over three months.

In April 1965, the Compagno Spider appeared, introducing the larger and more powerful 1000 engine. The engine displacement was initially kept below one liter to price the car in the lowest road tax bracket for Japanese buyers. The Spider received a twin-carb unit producing 65 PS (48 kW). One month later the larger engine was also installed in the Berlina, and a new four-door model (only with the bigger engine) was added. The four-door model sits on a 60 mm (2.4 in) longer wheelbase. 1000 Berlinas have a single carburettor and produce 55 PS (40 kW). In October 1965 the F31P Compagno Truck appeared, a small pickup truck capable of loading 500 kg (1,102 lb). The 800 cc engine gradually became installed only in the lesser variants as the 1000 cc segment gained in popularity in Japan. In November the Compagno 1000 GT appeared, a Berlina two-door with the more powerful Spider engine. In April 1967 a two-speed automatic transmission became available.

In May 1967, the Compagno received a minor facelift, with new head- and taillights and a new grille. The fender pressings were also subtly altered so as to streamline production. A Super Deluxe version of the four-door was added, while the Spider and GT gained front disc brakes. Last amongst the news was the 1000 GT Injection, with mechanical fuel injection albeit no more power than the existing twin-carb version. In April 1968 the front grille was altered again, with black trim for the Spider and GT. The Super Deluxe gained chrome trim at the rear. In April 1969 the succeeding Daihatsu Consorte appeared, using Daihatsu's own 1.0-litre engine fitted in the Toyota Publica KP30 body. Daihatsu decided to depend on Toyota for designing compact cars from now on. The Consorte was initially only available as a two-door sedan, and while the Van, Truck, and Convertibles were not replaced the four-door Super Deluxe remained in production until January 1970 so as to meet existing orders.

Notably, the Compagno was the first official Japanese car import for the UK market. Arriving in May 1965 in its initial 797cc form, UK press such as Autocar magazine found the car to be quite lackluster compared to its competition. Aside from the build quality and good standard equipment, the magazine review noted its outdated styling, poor ride and brakes, high price, and a 0-60 mph (97 km/h) time that was quoted as being "too slow to record." In the end, only six Compagnos would be sold in the UK in its five years on the market. Nonetheless, the Compagno would eventually inspire other Japanese automakers to begin exporting their products to European markets, such as the 1966 Corona from Toyota and the 1968 Sunny from Nissan (which would be known as the Datsun 1000).

The Compagno was also sold in numerous other European markets. In Australia, it was marketed until import tariffs were changed in 1968, which would have made the car prohibitively expensive. Daihatsu returned to the Australian passenger car market in 1972 with the Max 360X.

== Models ==
- 1963–1967 Compagno 800 Van (797 cc, 41 PS [30 kW]) three-door van; model F30V
- 1963–1967 Compagno 800 Berlina (797 cc, 41 PS [30 kW]) two-door sedan; model F30
- 1965–1970 Compagno 1000 Berlina (958 cc, 55 PS [40 kW]) two or four-door sedan; model F40 – later models have 58 PS
- 1965–1969 Compagno 1000 Truck (958 cc, 55 PS [40 kW]) two-door pickup truck; model F31P
- 1965–1969 Compagno Spider 1000 (958 cc, 65 PS [48 kW]) two-door convertible; model F40K

Maximum speed was around 110 km/h (68 mph) for the 800 cc model, 130 to 145 km/h (81 to 90 mph) for 1000 cc models. Late Spiders and GTs have a fuel injected engine.

== DN Compagno Concept ==
The DN Compagno is a concept car that was shown at the 2017 Tokyo Motor Show along with the original Compagno. According to Daihatsu, the design was aimed at "active seniors" and prioritized the relaxing comfort of the two front seats, combined with a high-quality interior.

== Gallery ==
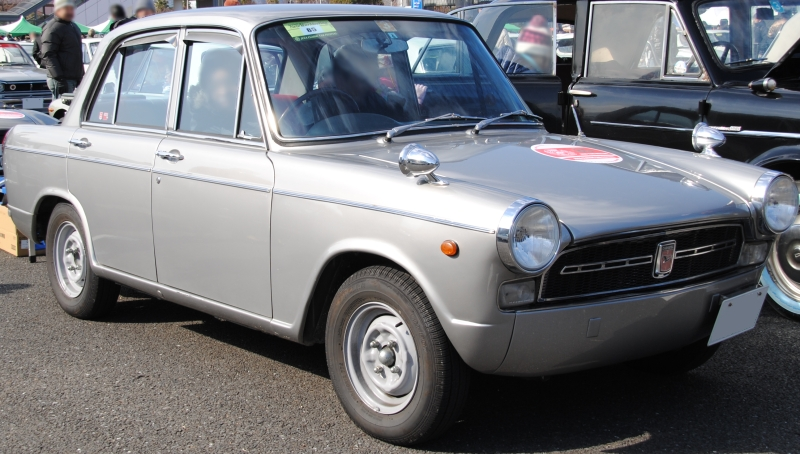
Compagno Berlina 1000 (4-door)

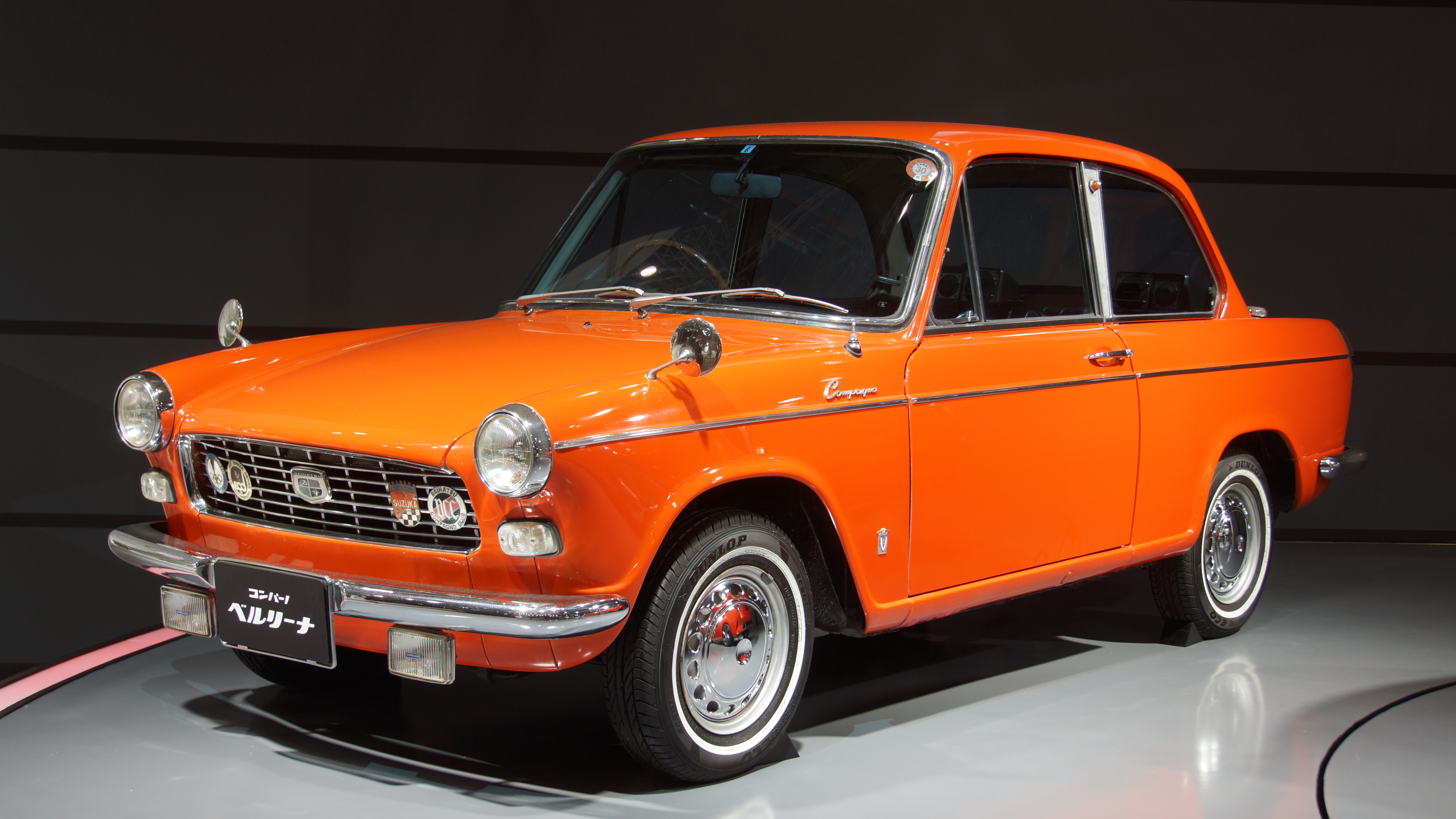
Compagno Berlina 2-door at the 2017 Tokyo Motor Show

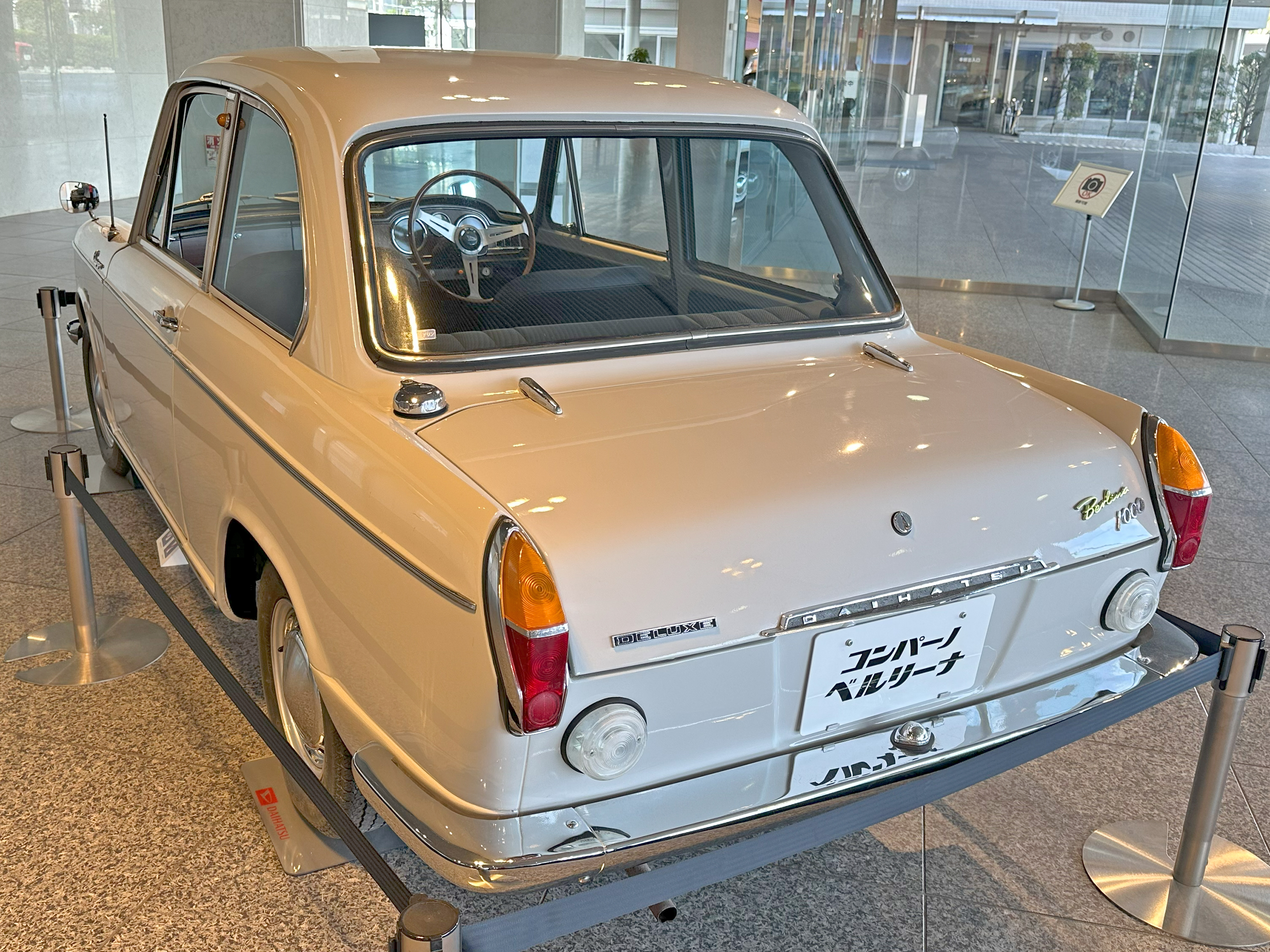
Daihatsu Compagno Berlina 2-door, rear

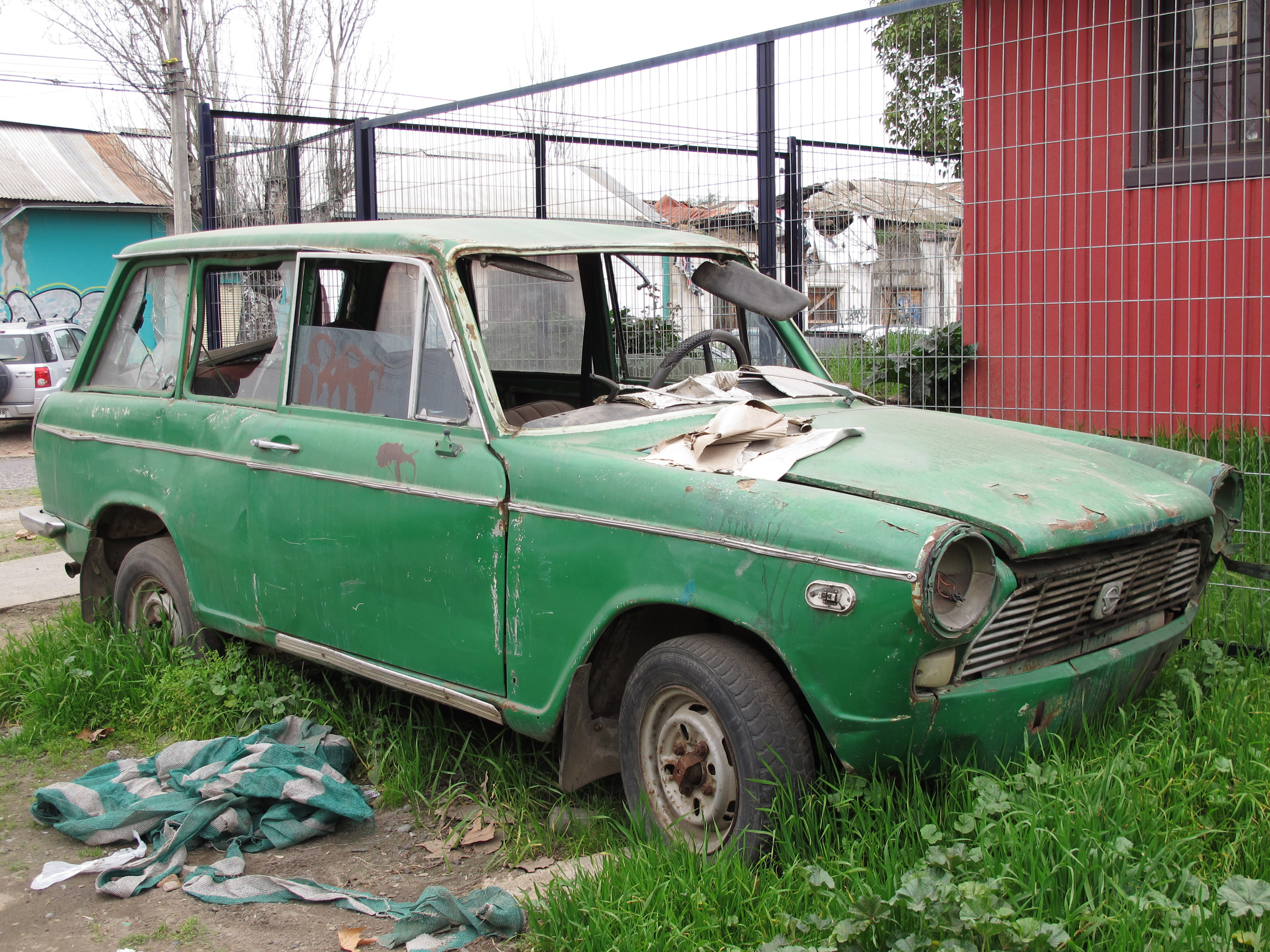
Daihatsu Compagno Estate

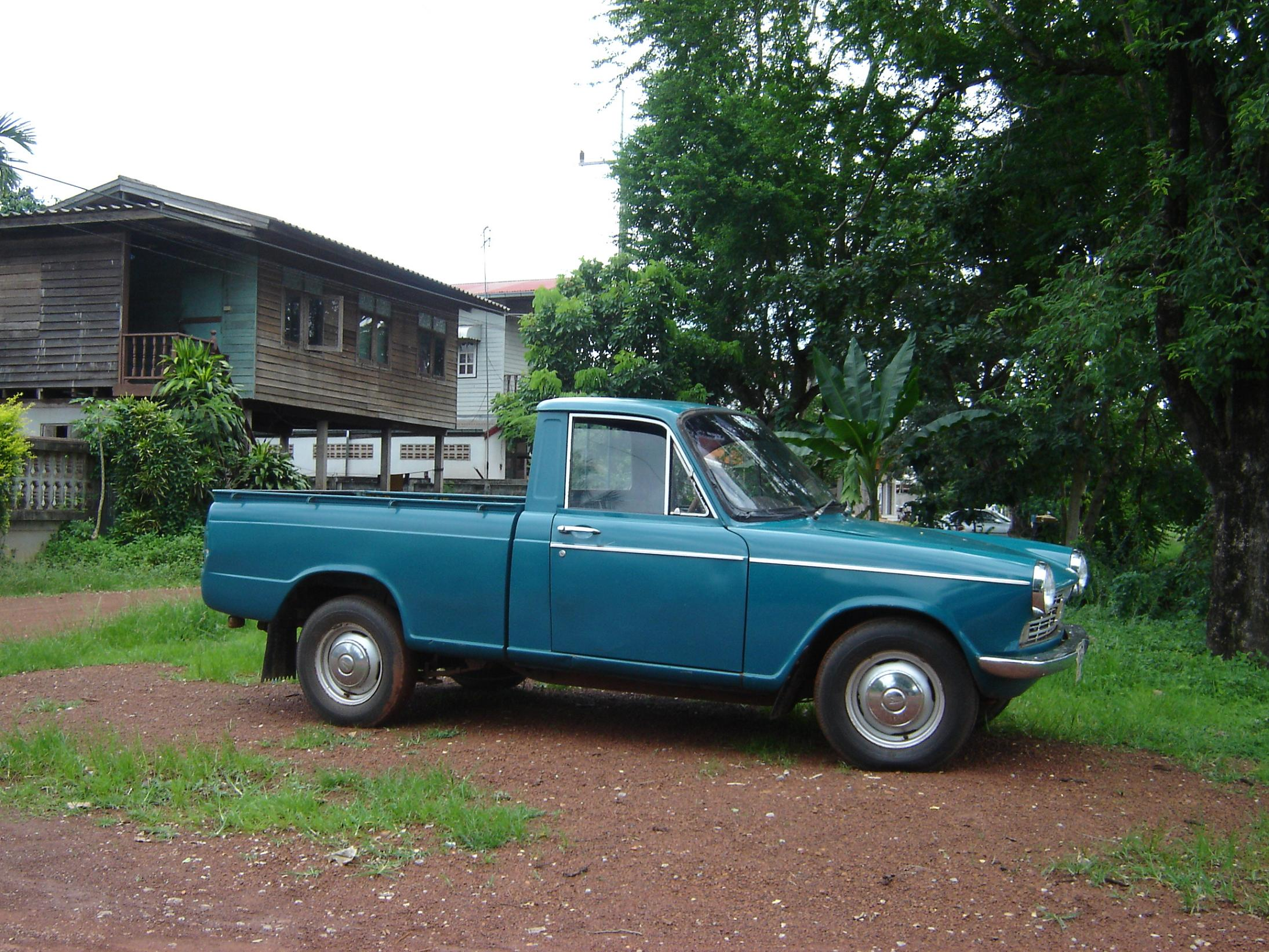
Daihatsu 1000 Pick-Up

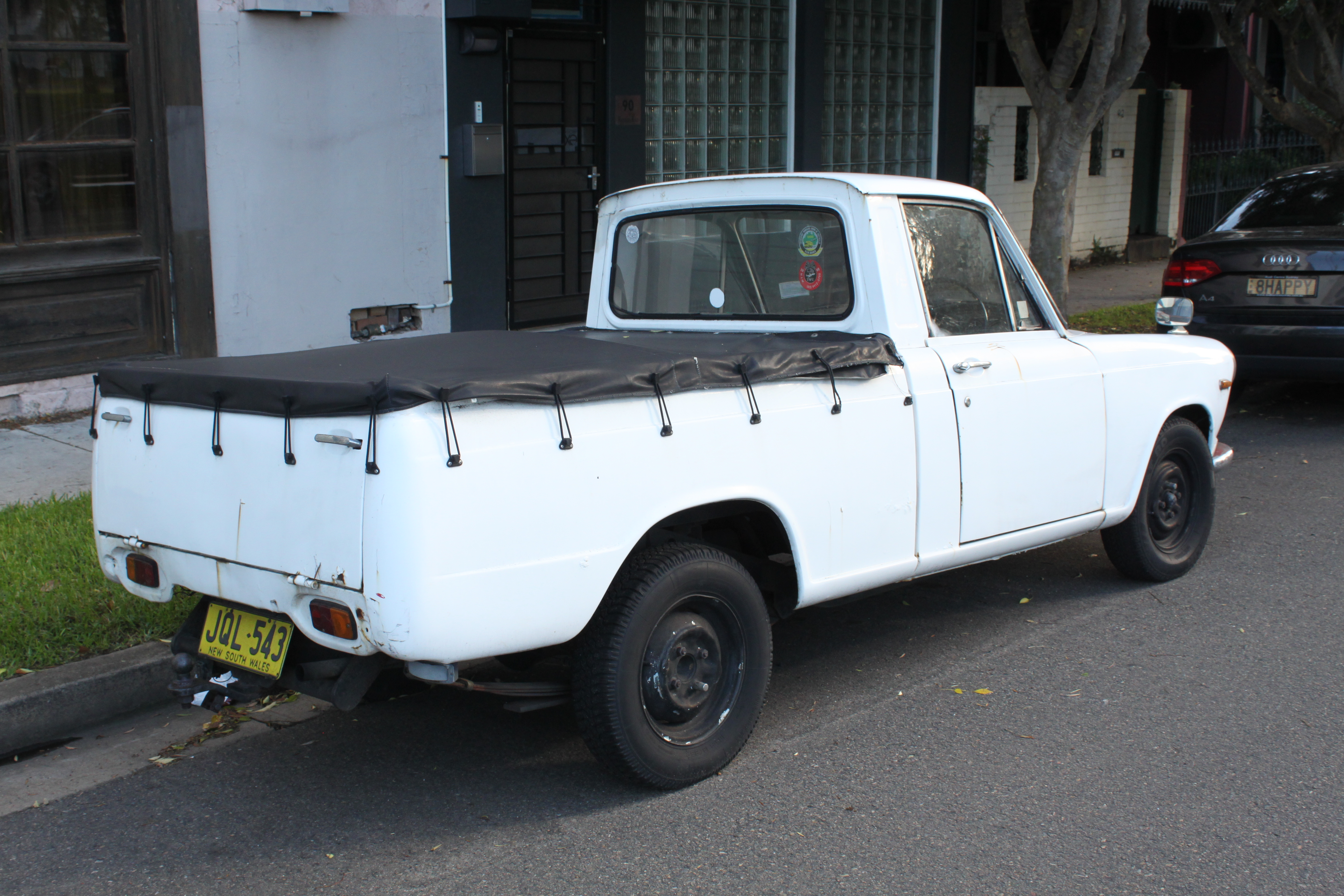
Daihatsu Compagno Pick-Up, rear

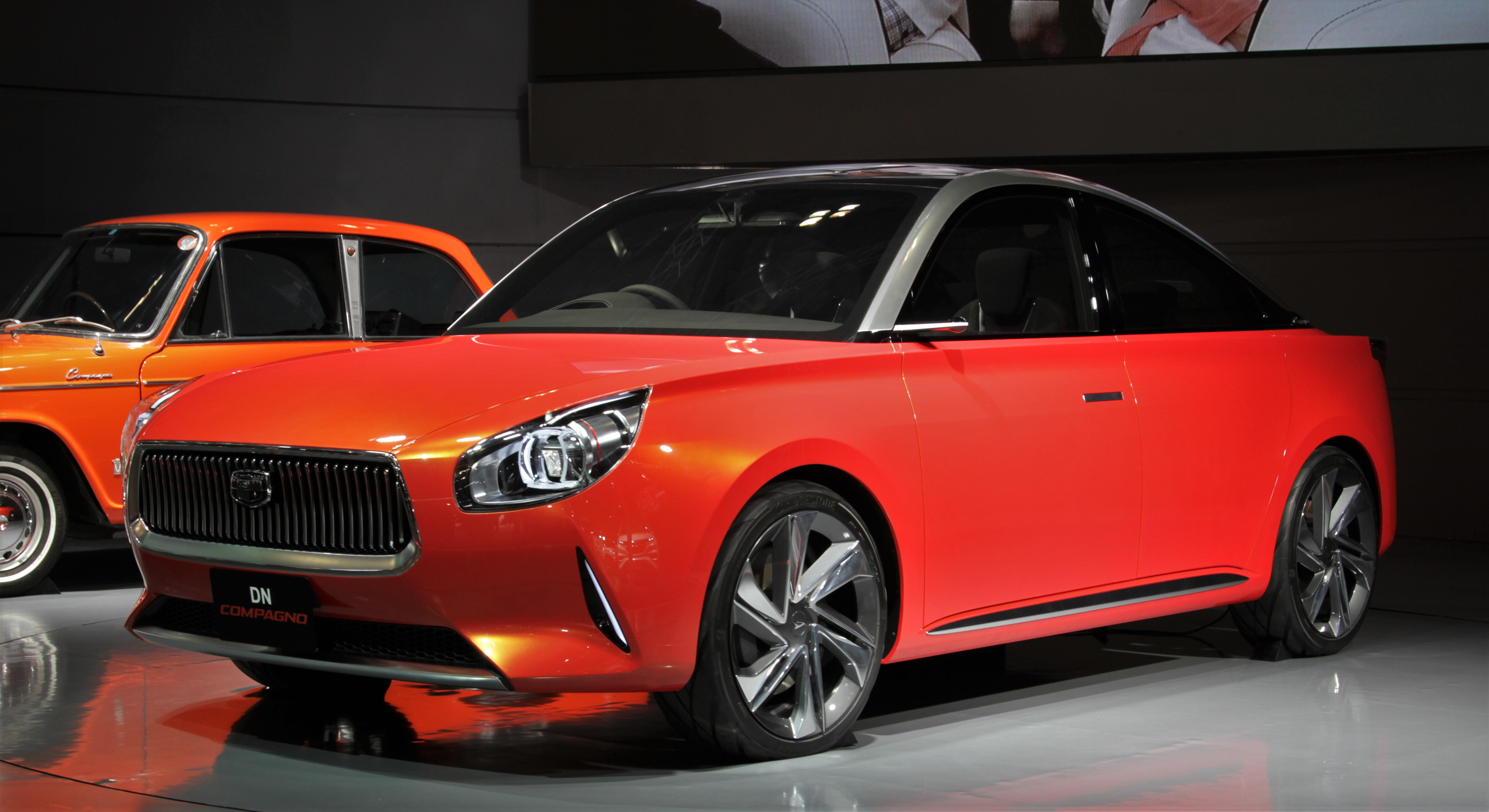
DN Compagno Concept at the 2017 Tokyo Motor Show
