= List of Daihatsu vehicles =

Japanese vehicles

The Japanese automobile manufacturer Daihatsu, a wholly owned subsidiary of Toyota Group since 2016, has produced a number of vehicles since its inception in 1951.

== Current production vehicles ==
Body style	Model				Current model		Main markets	Vehicle description
Body style	Image	Name(s)	Also called	Introduction (cal. year)	Introduction (model code)	Update/facelift	Main markets	Vehicle description
Kei car		Atrai	Subaru Sambar Dias	1981	2021 (S700/710)	-	Japan	Up-class version of the Hijet Cargo kei microvan. Battery Electric model is available.
Kei car		Mira e:S	Toyota Pixis Epoch; Subaru Pleo Plus	1980 (Mira); 2011 (Mira e:S)	2017 (LA350)	-	Japan	Entry level, low-roof hatchback kei car with hinged rear doors.
Kei car		Move	Subaru Stella	1995	2025 (LA850)	-	Japan	Tall-height wagon kei car with rear sliding doors.
Kei car		Move Canbus	-	2016	2022 (LA850)	-	Japan	Retro-styled kei car with rear sliding doors.
Kei car		Taft	-	1974 (nameplate); 2020 (as a kei crossover)	2020 (LA900)	-	Japan	Semi-tall height rugged crossover SUV-styled kei car.
Kei car		Tanto	Subaru Chiffon	2003	2019 (LA650)	2022	Japan	Tall-height wagon kei car with rear sliding doors with an absence of a B-pillar (pillarless opening) on the left side of the car.
Kei truck		Hijet	Toyota Pixis Van; Subaru Sambar Van	1960	2021 (S700/710)	-	Japan	Rear-wheel-drive (all-wheel-drive optional), mid-engined kei commercial microvan with rear sliding doors with the emphasis on rear cargo space. Battery Electric model is available.
Kei truck		Hijet	Toyota Pixis Truck; Subaru Sambar Truck; Daihatsu Hi-Max (Indonesia); Scion by Toyota KEI-01 (North America)	1960	2014 (S700/710)	2021	Japan	Rear-wheel-drive (all-wheel-drive optional), mid-engined cab over kei pickup truck. The current generation was produced in Indonesia between 2016 and 2019 as the Hi-Max with a larger 1.0-litre engine.
Hatchback		Ayla	Toyota Agya/Wigo; Perodua Axia (Malaysia and Singapore)	2013	2023 (A350)	-	Indonesia	Budget city car (A-segment) for the Indonesian market under the Low Cost Green Car category. A slightly reengineered version for the Malaysian market is available as the Perodua Axia.
Hatchback		Sirion	Perodua Myvi (Malaysia and Singapore)	1998 (nameplate); 2007 (Myvi-based)	2018 (M800)	2022	Indonesia	Subcompact hatchback (B-segment), a rebadged Perodua Myvi.
MPV/van		Gran Max	Toyota Town Ace Van; Toyota Lite Ace Van; Mazda Bongo Van	2007	2007 (S400)	2020	Indonesia; Japan and others	Rear-wheel-drive (all-wheel-drive optional in Japan), mid-engined semi-cab compact van with rear sliding doors. 3-seater panel van, 8-seater and 9-seater (face-to-face third row seating) configurations are available.
MPV/van		Luxio	-	2009	2009 (S400)	2014	Indonesia	Up-class version of the Gran Max for the Indonesian market.
MPV/van		Sigra	Toyota Calya	2016	2016 (B400)	2019	Indonesia	Three-row budget mini MPV for the Indonesian market under the Low Cost Green Car category.
MPV/van		Thor	Toyota Roomy; Toyota Tank (until 2020); Subaru Justy	2016	2016 (M900)	2020	Japan	Two-row boxy mini MPV with rear sliding doors.
MPV/van		Xenia	Toyota Avanza; Toyota Veloz; Perodua Alza (Malaysia)	2004	2021 (W100)	-	Indonesia	Three-row compact MPV for the Indonesian market.
SUV/crossover		Rocky	Toyota Raize; Subaru Rex (Japan); Perodua Ativa (Malaysia)	1984 (nameplate); 2019 (as a crossover)	2019 (A200)	-	Japan; Indonesia	'Number 5' (compact car with a width under 1,700 mm) front-wheel-drive mini/subcompact crossover SUV. Hybrid powertrain model is available
SUV/crossover		Terios	Toyota Rush; Perodua Aruz (Malaysia)	1997	2017 (F800)	2023	Indonesia	Three-row, rear-wheel-drive compact SUV.
Pickup truck		Gran Max	Toyota Town Ace Truck; Toyota Lite Ace Truck; Mazda Bongo Truck	2007	2007 (S400)	2020	Indonesia; Japan	Three-seater, rear-wheel-drive (all-wheel-drive optional in Japan), mid-engined semi-cab compact basic pickup truck.

== Former production vehicles ==
Model	Introduced	Discontinued	Notes	Image
Daihatsu Applause	1988	2000		
Daihatsu Ascend/Valéra	1993	2000	also known as the Charade	
Daihatsu Altis	2000	2023	OEM supply as Toyota Camry	
Daihatsu Bee	1951	1952		
Daihatsu Be‣go	2006	2016	Japanese version of the Terios	
Daihatsu Boon Luminas	2008	2012		
Daihatsu Boon	2004	2023		
Daihatsu Cast	2015	2023		
Daihatsu Ceria	2001	2006	rebadge of Perodua Kancil	
Daihatsu Charade	1977	2000		
Daihatsu Charmant	1974	1987	rebadge of Toyota Corolla	
Daihatsu Compagno	1963	1970		
Daihatsu Coo/Materia	2006	2012	OEM supply as Toyota bB and Subaru Dex	
Daihatsu Consorte	1969	1977		
Daihatsu Copen	2002	2026		
Daihatsu Delta	1970	2003		
Daihatsu Esse	2005	2011		
Daihatsu Fellow Max	1966	1980		
Daihatsu Hijet Caddie	2016	2021		
Daihatsu Hijet Gran Cargo/Extol	1999	2004		
Daihatsu Hi-Max	2016	2019	Indonesian version of the Hijet	
Daihatsu Leeza	1986	1993		
Daihatsu Leeza Spider	1989	1993		
Daihatsu Max	2001	2005		
Daihatsu Mebius	2013	2021	OEM supply as Toyota Prius V	
Daihatsu Midget/Midget II	1996	2001		
Daihatsu Mira/Cuore/Domino/Handi/Handivan	1980	2018		
Daihatsu Mira Cocoa	2009	2018		
Daihatsu Mira Gino	1999	2009		
Daihatsu Mira Tocot	2018	2023		
Daihatsu Move Conte	2008	2017		
Daihatsu Move Latte	2004	2009		
Daihatsu Naked	1999	2004		
Daihatsu New Line	1963	1968		
Daihatsu Opti	1992	2002		
Daihatsu Pyzar/Gran Move/Grand Move	1996	2002		
Daihatsu Rocky/Feroza/Sportrak (F300)	1989	2002		
Daihatsu Rugger/Rocky/Fourtrak/Taft/Hiline/Feroza (F70)	1989	2002	OEM supply as Toyota Blizzard	
Daihatsu Sonica	2006	2009		
Daihatsu Storia	1998	2004	OEM supply as Toyota Duet	
Daihatsu Taft (F10/F20/F50/F60)/Scat	1974	1984	OEM supply as Toyota Blizzard	
Daihatsu Tanto Exe	2009	2014	OEM supply as Subaru Lucra	
Daihatsu Taruna	1999	2006	Indonesian version of the Terios	
Daihatsu Trevis	2004	2009	European version of the Mira Gino	
Daihatsu Wake	2014	2022		
Daihatsu YRV	2000	2005		
Daihatsu Zebra/Hijet Zebra/Hijet Maxx/Citivan	1987	2007		

=== Former commercial vehicles ===
- Charade Van
- Charmant Van
- Compagno Van/Truck
- FA pickup truck
- Delta series
- Hi-Line/F series
- Hijet Caddie
- Hijet Gran Cargo/Extol
- Hijet Zebra/Zebra/Hijet Maxx/Citivan (OEM supply as Perodua Rusa)
- Hi-Max
- Light Bus series
- Midget
- Mira Van/Walk-through Van/Miracab
- New Line
- Taft Truck (F25/55)
- Vesta/V series

=== Three-wheeled trucks ===
- BF (1962) 1¼-ton
- BM (1962) 1½-ton
- BO (1961) 2-ton
- CF (1962) 1¼-ton
- CM (1962) 1½-ton
- CO (1963) 2-ton
- HA (1930)
- HB (1931)
- HD (1931)
- HF (1933)
- HS (1934)
- HT (1933)
- Midget DK/DS/MP (1957–1972)
- PF (1958) 1¼-ton
- PL (1958) 1-ton
- PM (1958) 1½-ton
- PO (1959) 2-ton
- RKF (1957) 1-ton
- RKM (1957) 1½-ton
- RKO (1956) 2-ton
- RO (1958)
- SCA (1955) ¾-ton
- SCB (1955) 1-ton
- SCE (1955) 1-ton
- SCO (1955) 2-ton
- SE/SSE (1946) ½-ton
- SDB (1956) 1-ton
- SDF (1956) 1-ton
- SF (1948) ½-ton
- SH (1949) ½-ton
- SK (1951) ½-ton
- SKD (1957) 1-ton
- SKC (1958) ¾-ton
- SDF/SSDF (1956) 1-ton
- SN/SSN (1952) 1-ton
- SSH (1950) ¾-ton
- SX (1954)
- UF (1960) 1¼-ton
- UM (1960) 1½-ton
- UO (1960) 2-ton
- DBC-1 (1971) battery electric

=== Racing cars ===
- P-3
- P-5

== See also ==
- Daihatsu
- Toyota
- List of Toyota vehicles
- Subaru
