= Daihatsu Move Latte =

Daihatsu Move Latte (L550)
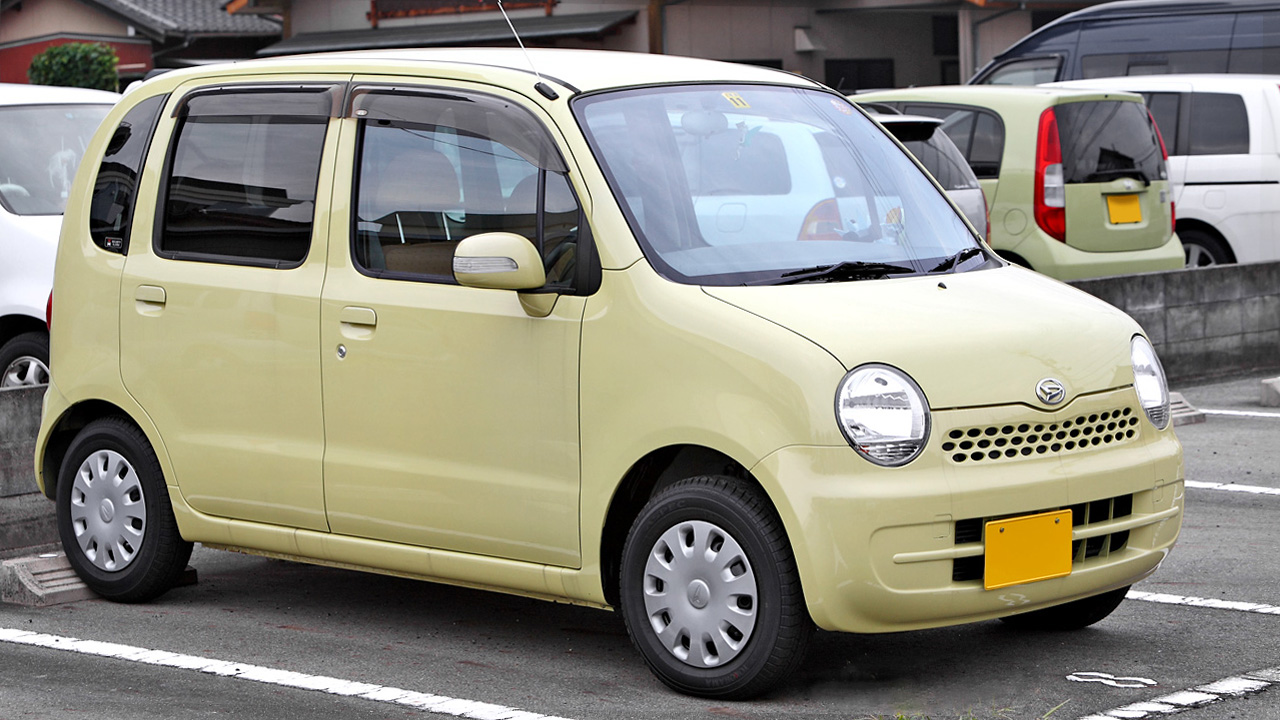
- Daihatsu Move Latte L (L550S)

Overview
- Manufacturer: Daihatsu
- Production: August 2004 – March 2009
- Assembly: Japan
- Designer: Masato Iwakura, Yoshihiro Yamamoto and Takashi Hino

Body and chassis
- Class: Kei car
- Body style: 5-door hatchback
- Layout: Front-engine, front-wheel-drive; Front-engine, four-wheel-drive
- Related: Daihatsu Move (L150); Daihatsu Mira Gino (L650)

Powertrain
- Engine: Petrol: 658 cc EF-VE I3; 658 cc EF-DET turbo I3
- Power output: 43 kW (58 hp; 58 PS) (EF-VE); 47 kW (63 hp; 64 PS) (EF-DET)
- Transmission: 4-speed automatic

Dimensions
- Wheelbase: 2,390 mm (94.1 in)
- Length: 3,395 mm (133.7 in)
- Width: 1,475 mm (58.1 in)
- Height: 1,630 mm (64.2 in)
- Kerb weight: 820–920 kg (1,808–2,028 lb)

Chronology
- Successor: Daihatsu Move Conte; Daihatsu Mira Cocoa

The Daihatsu Move Latte (Japanese: ダイハツ・ムーヴラテ, Hepburn: Daihatsu Mūvu Rate) is a kei car with retro styling built by the Japanese carmaker Daihatsu from 2004 to 2009. It is a cosmetic variation of the L150 series Move targeted to women in their late twenties and early thirties who frequent cafes, and is related to the L650 series Mira Gino, another kei car with distinctive retro styling which is based on the L250 series Mira.

It was launched on 23 August 2004, followed by the Cool version on 2 June 2005. The Cool is fitted with various aerodynamic parts, a more traditional grille with chrome trim, and clear taillights. On 4 June 2007, the facelifted model was launched.

The car was discontinued in March 2009 and replaced by both the Move Conte and Mira Cocoa.

The name "Latte" means "milk" in Italian and also refers to the latte coffee.

== Gallery ==
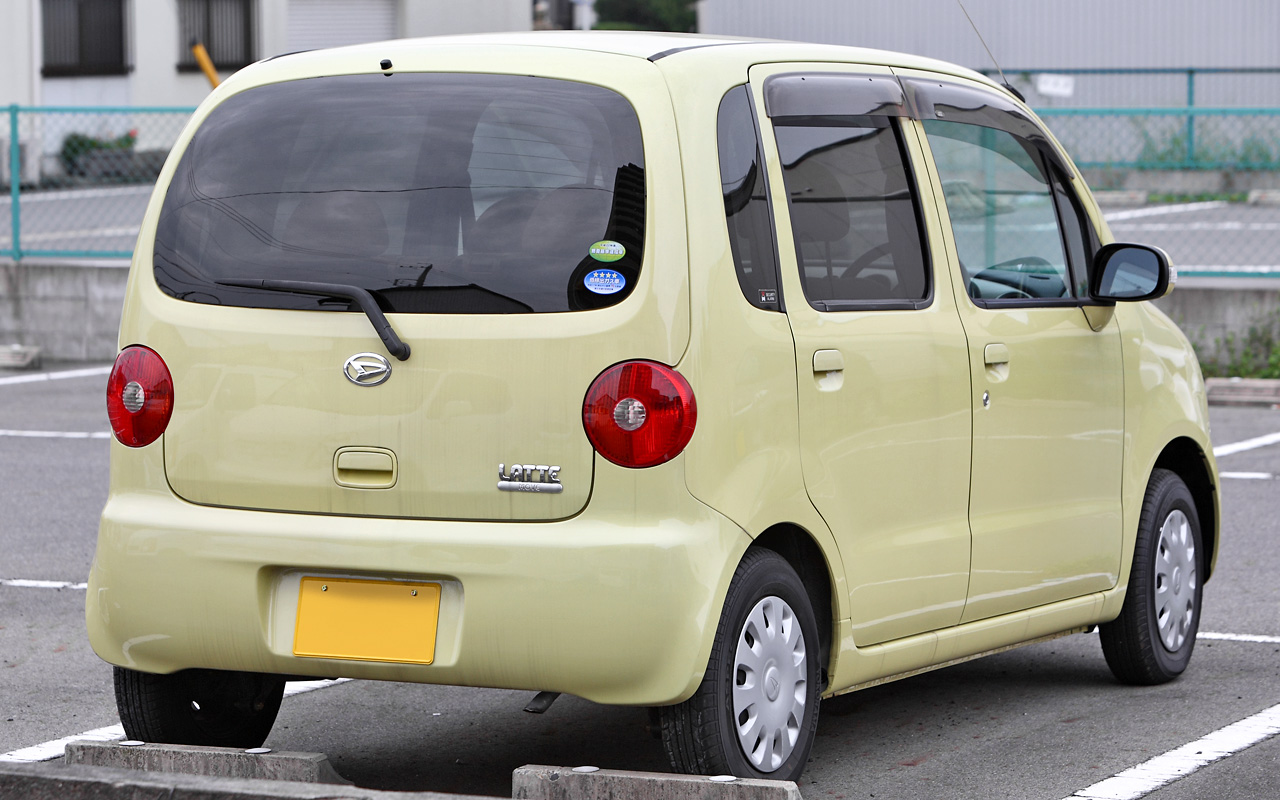
Move Latte L (L550S)

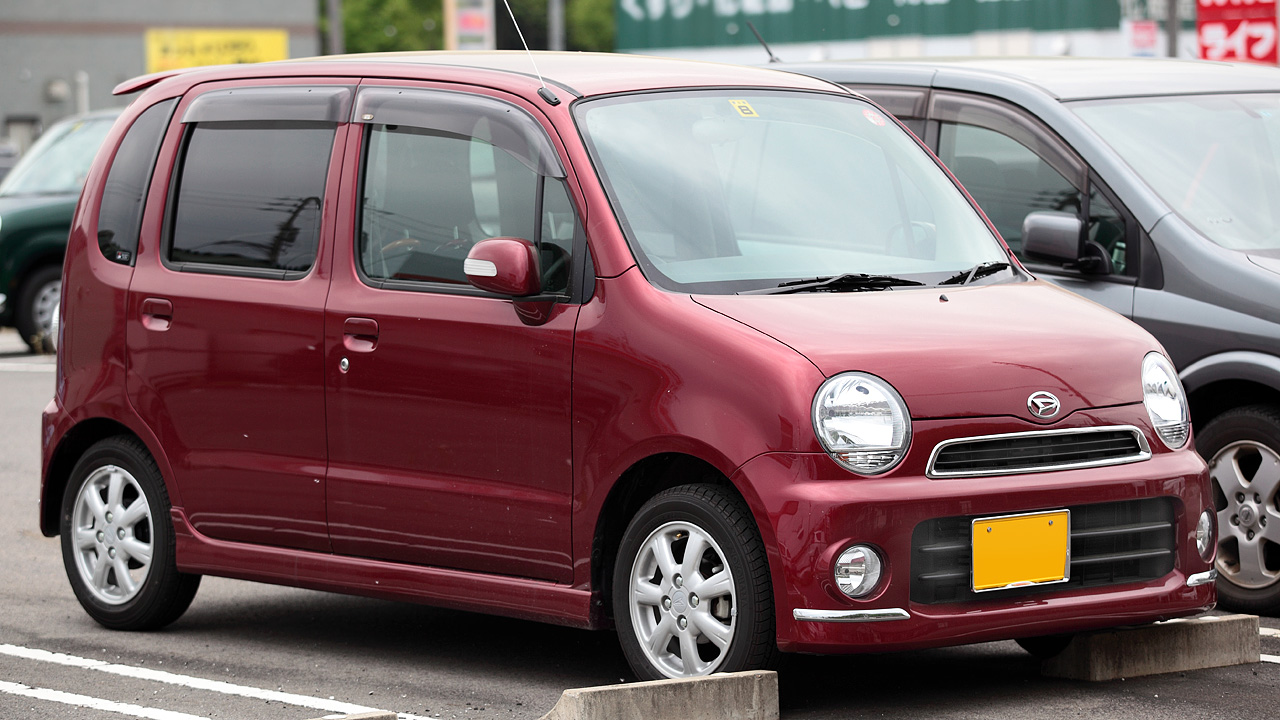
Move Latte Cool (L550S)

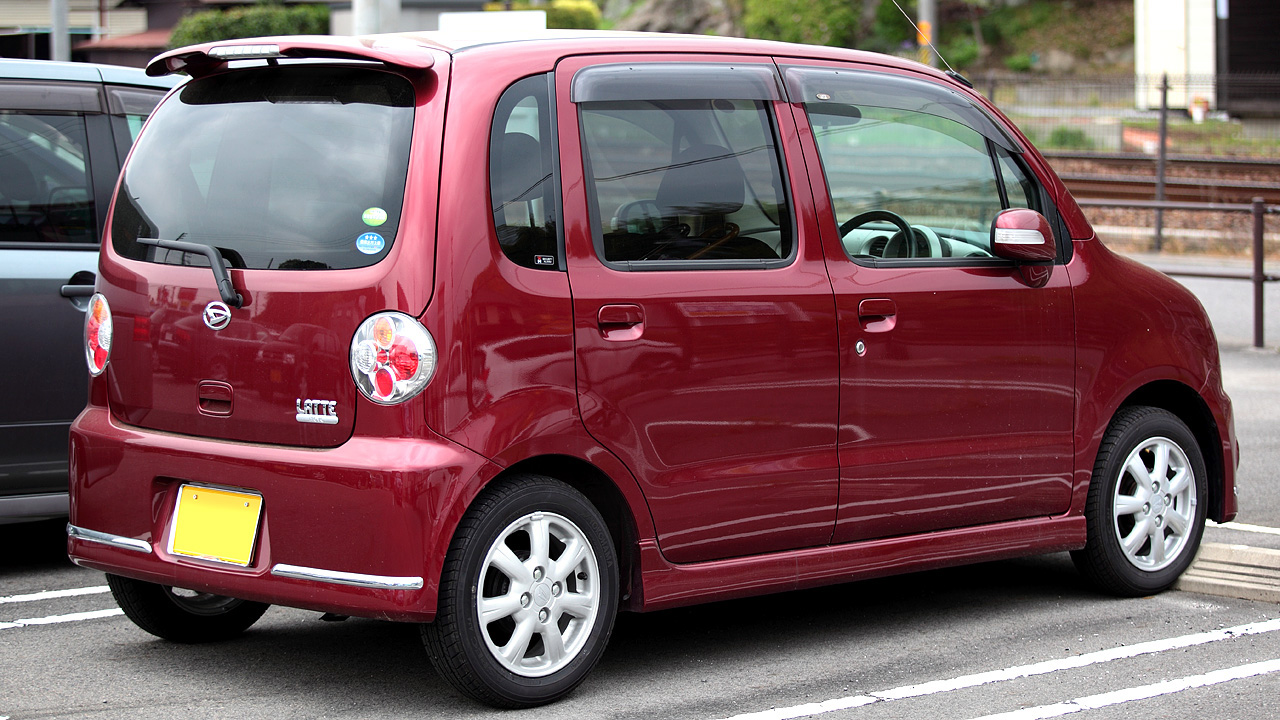
Move Latte Cool (L550S)
