= Daihatsu EV1 =

Japanese electric concept car

Overview
- Manufacturer: Daihatsu
- Production: 1973

Body and chassis
- Class: Concept car
- Body style: 2-door hatchback
- Layout: Rear-motor, rear-wheel-drive

Powertrain
- Electric motor: 2×5.6 kW (7.5 hp; 7.6 PS)
- Battery: 21.1 kWh
- Range: 100–175 km (62–109 mi)

Dimensions
- Length: 3,165 mm (124.6 in)
- Width: 1,420 mm (55.9 in)
- Height: 1,315 mm (51.8 in)
- Curb weight: 1,132 kg (2,496 lb)

The Daihatsu EV1 was a concept car designed by Daihatsu as an electric test vehicle and first unveiled at the 1973 Tokyo Motor Show. Only one unit was built.

== Specifications ==
The EV1 uses two 5.6 kW (7.5 hp; 7.6 PS) electric motors, which is rear-mounted and driving the rear axle, and powered by a 21.1 kWh battery which are contained in a removable tray for easier charging. The combined power output is up to 11.2 kW (15.0 hp; 15.2 PS). It has a claimed 0–30 km/h (0–19 mph) acceleration time in 2.4 seconds and a top speed of 89 km/h (55 mph).
