= Daihatsu P3 =

- Constructor: Daihatsu
- Successor: Daihatsu P5

Technical specifications
- Chassis: Tubular frame
- Suspension (front): Double wishbone
- Suspension (rear): Multi-link (4-link)
- Engine: R92A 1,261 cc (77.0 cu in) DOHC 16-valve I4 naturally-aspirated Front engined
- Transmission: Hewland MK-IV 5-speed manual
- Tyres: Dunlop R7

Competition history
- Notable drivers: (Japan) Yuzo Takechi (Japan) Keizo Yabuki (Japan) Takao Yoshida (Japan) Hiroyuki Kukidome
- Debut: 1966 Japanese Grand Prix
Races	Wins
3	1 (class)

The Daihatsu P3 was a sports racing car built by Daihatsu in 1966. It was the predecessor of the P-5, and it featured a 1.3-litre twin-cam straight-four engine capable of producing around about 100 PS.

== History ==
The P-3 was the first Daihatsu race car and it featured a 1.3-litre straight-four engine fitted in the front of the car, which was capable of producing up to 100 hp (74.6 kW; 101.4 PS).

The P-3 made its competitive debut at the Japanese Grand Prix in 1966, which was held at Fuji Speedway, where it won the eponymous P3 category. It was also entered in the 1000 km of Suzuka in same year, where it did not finish the race. The following year, it was then run in the Suzuka 12 Hours; the No.6 car won the P1 class, and finished fourth overall. The P-3 was succeeded by the P-5, which was more powerful than the P-3.
