= Daihatsu Mira Gino =

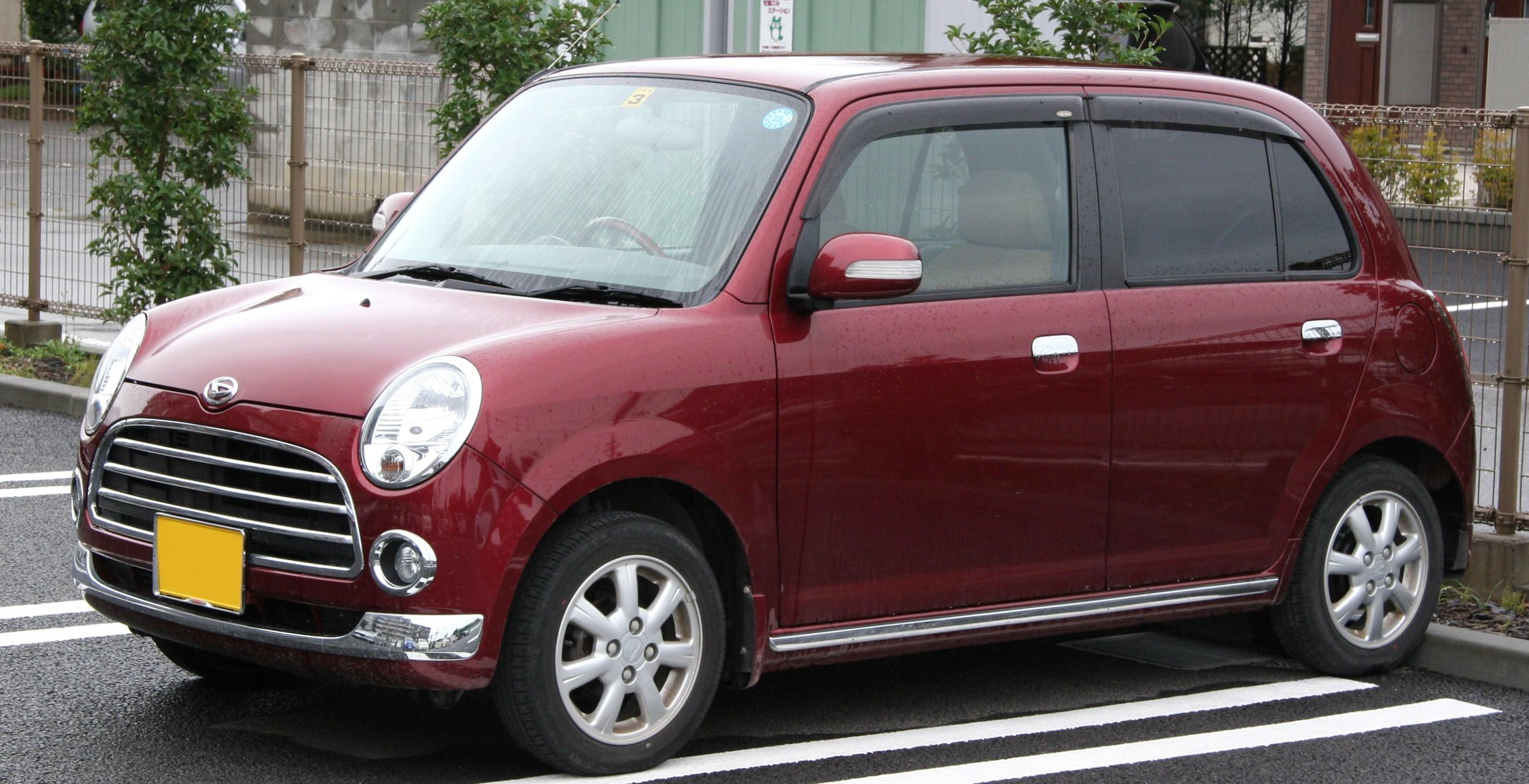

Overview
- Manufacturer: Daihatsu
- Also called: Daihatsu Trevis (Europe, 2004–2009)
- Production: March 1999 – March 2009

Body and chassis
- Class: Kei car (Mira Gino); City car (Mira Gino 1000 and Trevis)
- Layout: Front-engine, front-wheel-drive; Front-engine, four-wheel-drive (Japan only)

Chronology
- Predecessor: Daihatsu Mira Classic
- Successor: Daihatsu Mira Cocoa

The Daihatsu Mira Gino (Japanese: ダイハツ・ミラジーノ, Daihatsu Mira Jīno) is a kei car/city car with distinctive retro styling made by the Japanese automaker Daihatsu from 1999 to 2009. It is based on the more mainstream Mira and was first introduced to the Japanese market in 1999, with the second generation model following in 2004. The Mira Gino replaced the Mira Classic which is a subvariant of the L500 series Mira. The second generation model was also exported as the Daihatsu Trevis to some markets in Europe such as Germany, the Netherlands, Italy, Gibraltar and France.

== First generation (L700; 1999) ==
First generation
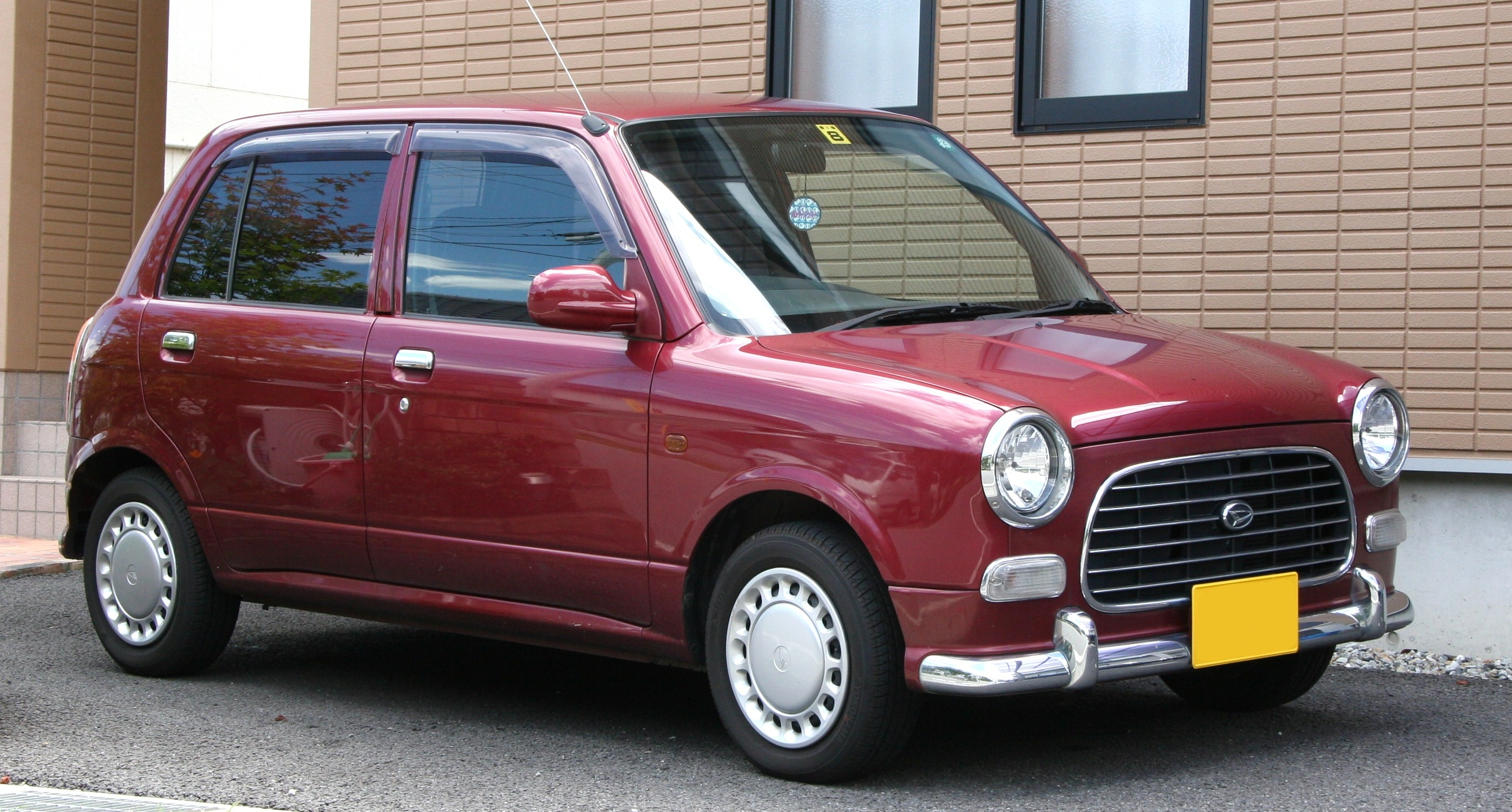

Overview
- Model code: L700
- Production: March 1999 – November 2004 (Mira Gino); August 2002 – July 2004 (Mira Gino 1000)

Body and chassis
- Body style: 3/5-door hatchback
- Related: Daihatsu Mira (L700); Perodua Kelisa

Powertrain
- Engine: petrol: 658 cc EF-VE I3; 658 cc EF-DET turbo I3; 989 cc EJ-VE I3
- Power output: 58 PS (43 kW) (EF-VE); 64 PS (47 kW) (EF-DET/EJ-VE)
- Transmission: 5-speed manual; 3-speed automatic; 4-speed automatic; CVT

Dimensions
- Wheelbase: 2,360 mm (92.9 in)
- Length: 3,395 mm (133.7 in); 3,415 mm (134.4 in) (Mira Gino 1000)
- Width: 1,475 mm (58.1 in); 1,495 mm (58.9 in) (Mira Gino 1000)
- Height: 1,425 mm (56.1 in)
- Kerb weight: 830 kg (1,830 lb) (Mira Gino 1000)

Chronology
- Successor: Daihatsu Boon (Mira Gino 1000)

The first generation Mira Gino was introduced in 1999 and was available in either three or five-door versions. The car is based on the L700 series Mira, which was produced between 1998 and 2002. The car was originally only available with the 658 cc EF series inline-three petrol engine, in naturally aspirated or turbocharged. Either front- or four-wheel drive is available. It features a retro styling, which evokes the design of the Compagno and the classic Mini.

As of October 2002, a Minilite Special model was offered, featuring Minilite alloy wheels, stickers, and additional front driving lights. This was later joined by a Minilite Special Turbo and the Minilite Special Limited, and also formed the basis for the Mira Gino Hello Kitty Edition presented in December 2001. The Hello Kitty edition received a key and door lock knobs shaped like the character, numerous stickers on the outside, smoked window glass, special upholstery, and Hello Kitty floormats among other extras.

An unusual development was the installation of the European market 989 cc EJ-VE inline-three petrol engine in the Mira Gino 1000, presented in August 2002. This version no longer fit into the "kei" class because of its larger engine and was also marginally longer and wider due to the installation of bumper overriders and fender trim. The bigger engine produced 64 PS (47 kW) at 6,000 rpm, the same peak power as the turbocharged 658 cc engine, but offered considerably more power at lower engine speeds. 1,292 units of the Gino 1000 had been built when production came to an end in June 2004. The only transmission option was a four-speed automatic, which was available with either front- or four-wheel drive. There was a base model and a better equipped "X" version. The Gino 1000 underwent no stylistic or mechanical changes during its production run. It was effectively replaced by the 1.0 L variant of the Boon. The kei class Mira Gino was kept in production until November 2004.

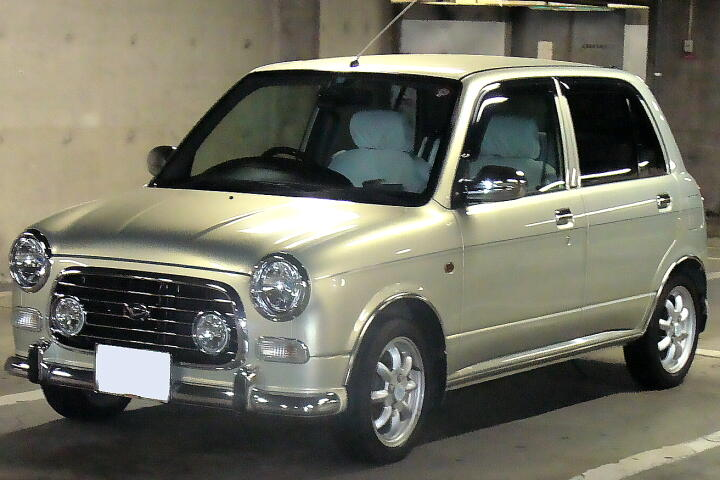
Daihatsu Mira Gino 1000

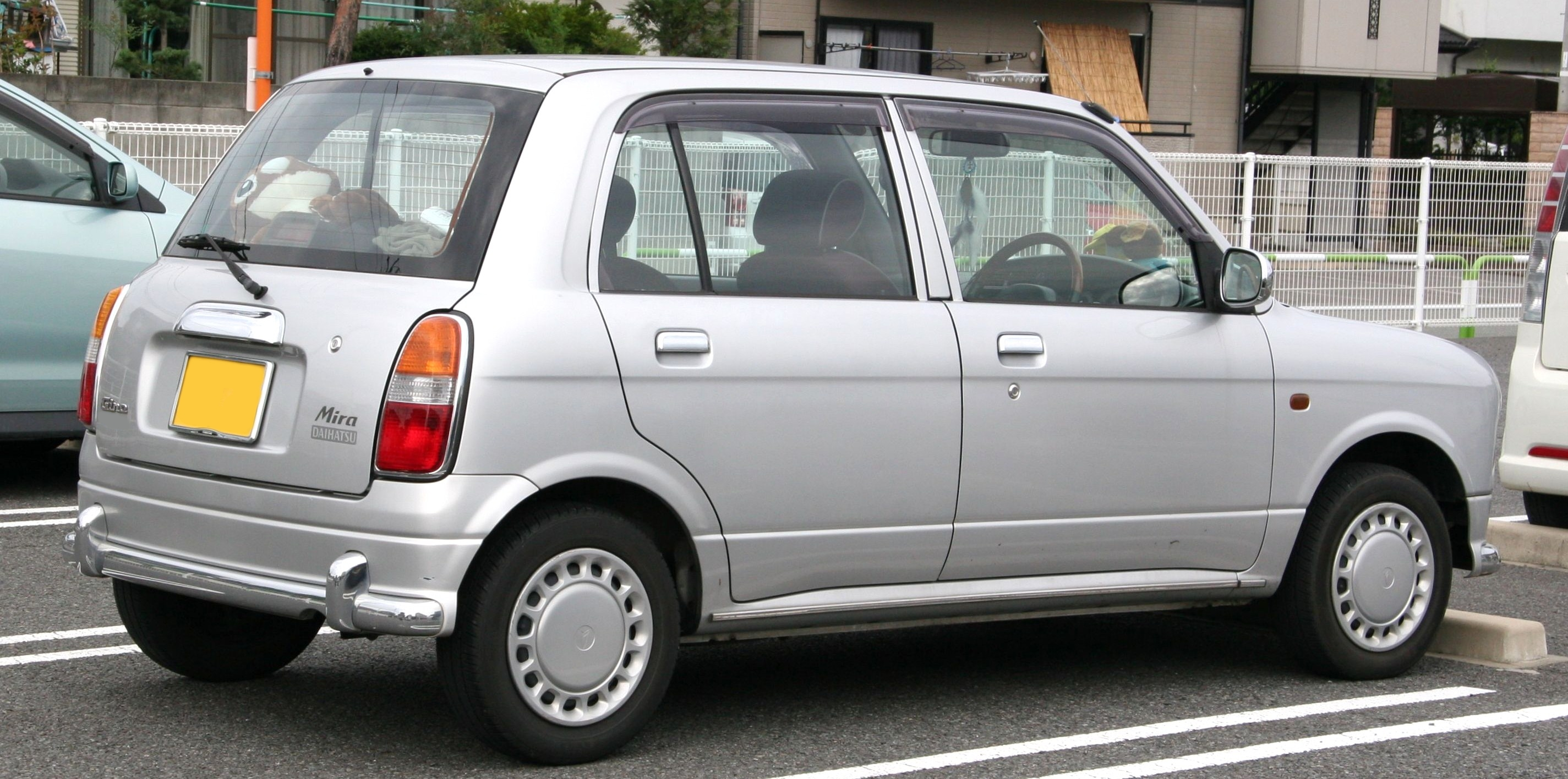
Rear view

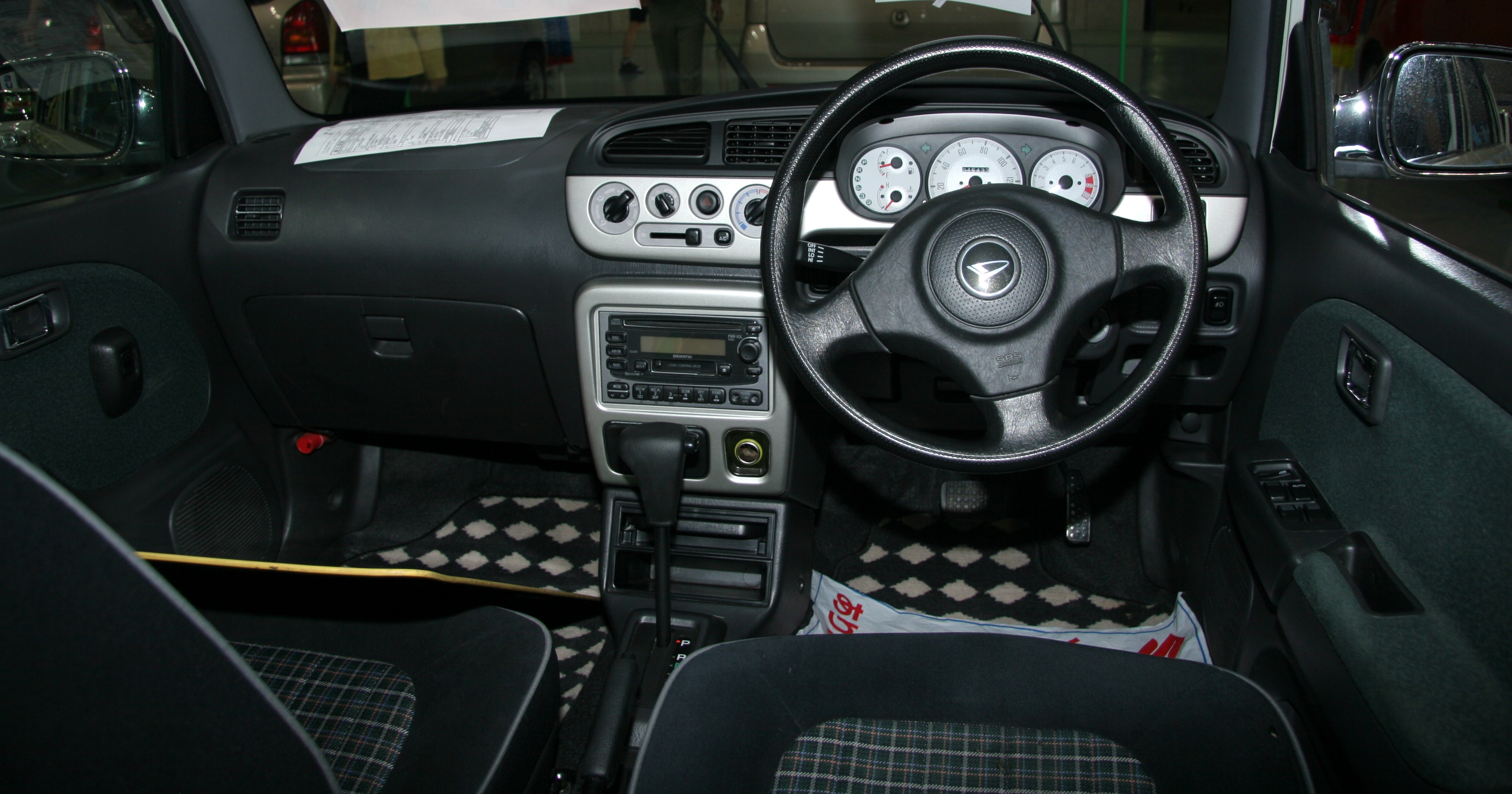
Interior

== Second generation (L650S; 2004) ==
Second generation
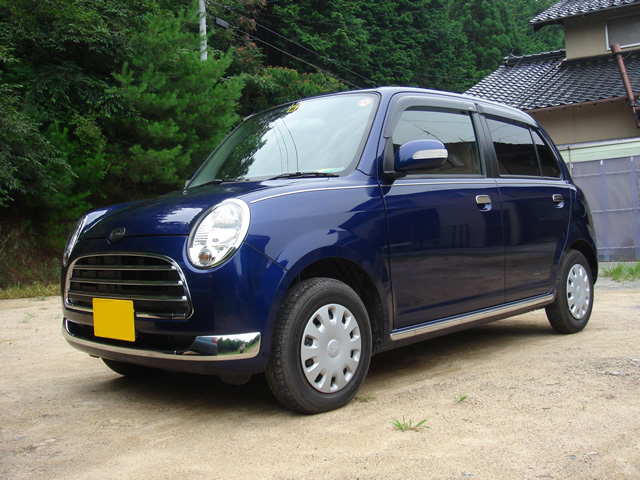

Overview
- Model code: L650S/L660S
- Also called: Daihatsu Trevis (Europe)
- Production: November 2004 – March 2009

Body and chassis
- Body style: 5-door hatchback
- Related: Daihatsu Mira (L250); Daihatsu Move Latte

Powertrain
- Engine: 658 cc EF-VE I3; 989 cc EJ-VE I3 (Trevis)
- Transmission: 5-speed manual; 4-speed automatic

Dimensions
- Wheelbase: 2,390 mm (94.1 in)
- Length: 3,395 mm (133.7 in)
- Width: 1,475 mm (58.1 in)
- Height: 1,515 mm (59.6 in)

For the second generation model, the three-door version was dropped and it was only available as a five-door hatchback. Only the naturally aspirated EF-VE engine was available, still producing 58 PS (43 kW) at 7,600 rpm and 64 N⋅m (47 lb⋅ft) at 4,000 rpm. It was cleaner than the earlier version, though, thanks to "intelligent catalysts". The Mira Gino was discontinued in March 2009 and replaced by the Mira Cocoa, also with retro styling, albeit more original.

The styling was again inspired by the Mini, although this time the newer BMW-built Mini set the example. In Europe, this generation of the Mira Gino was sold as the Trevis (L651LS), using the European-market Cuore's 1-litre engine with 58 PS (43 kW) at 6,000 rpm and also available with a five-speed manual transmission. While maximum power was the same as for the one-third smaller engine used in Japan, torque was considerably higher at 91 N⋅m (67 lb⋅ft). The regular Trevis was well equipped, with climate control and a leather, Momo steering wheel. There was also a stripped version at a lower price, called the Trevis Junior.

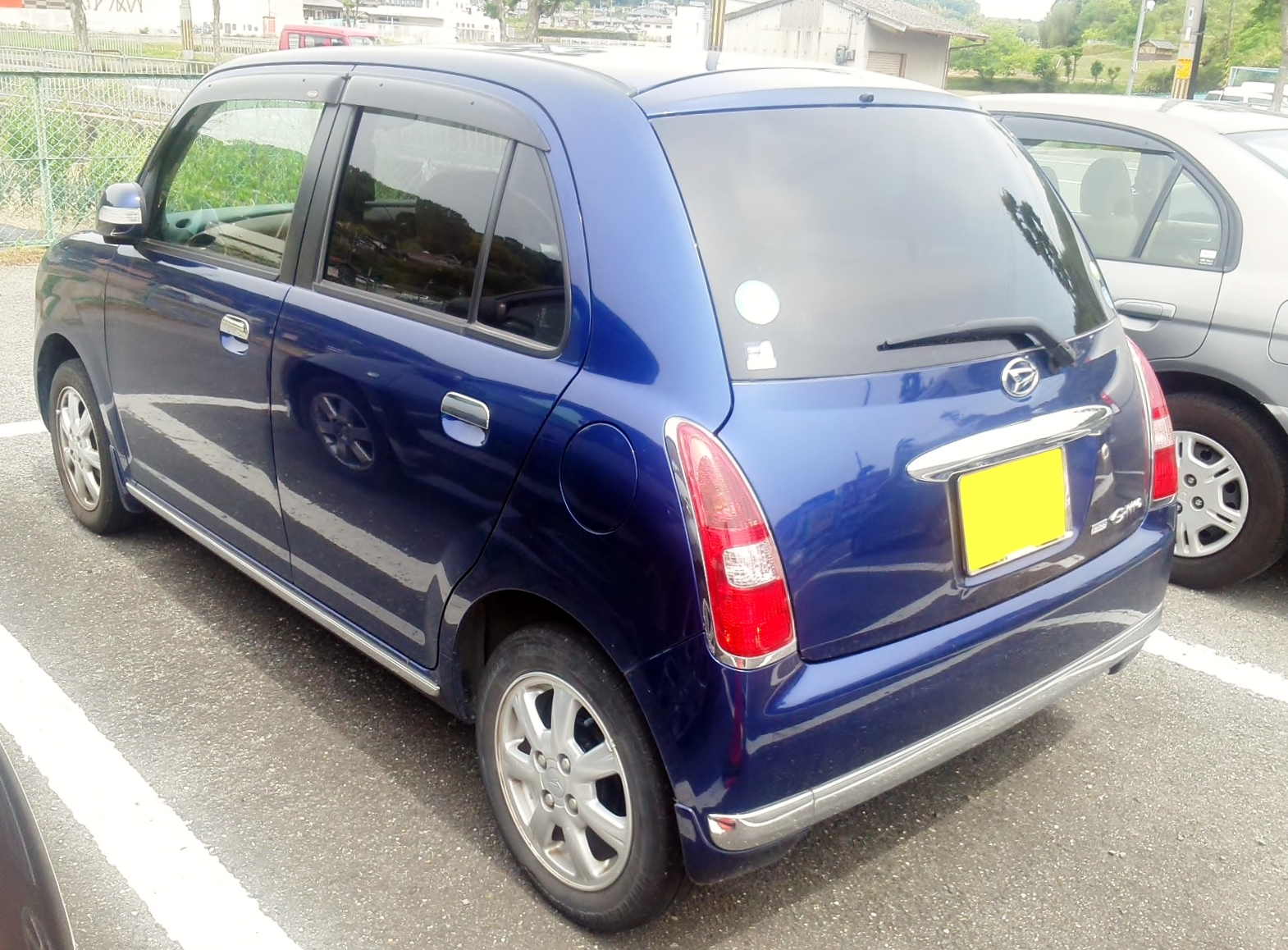
Daihatsu Mira Gino X Limited 4WD (L660S; Japan)

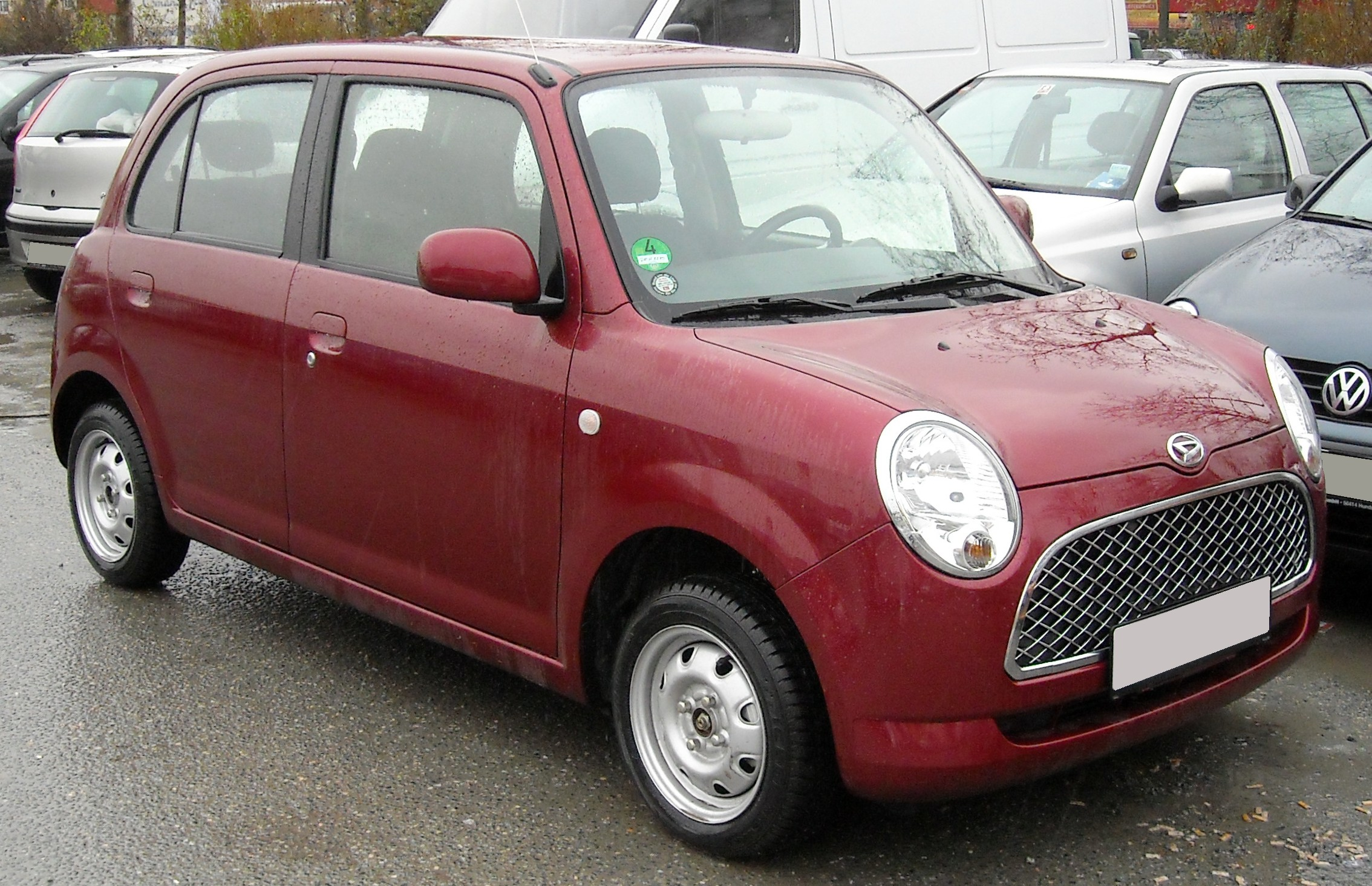
Daihatsu Trevis (L651LS; Europe)
