= Daihatsu Mira Tocot =

Daihatsu Mira Tocot (LA550)
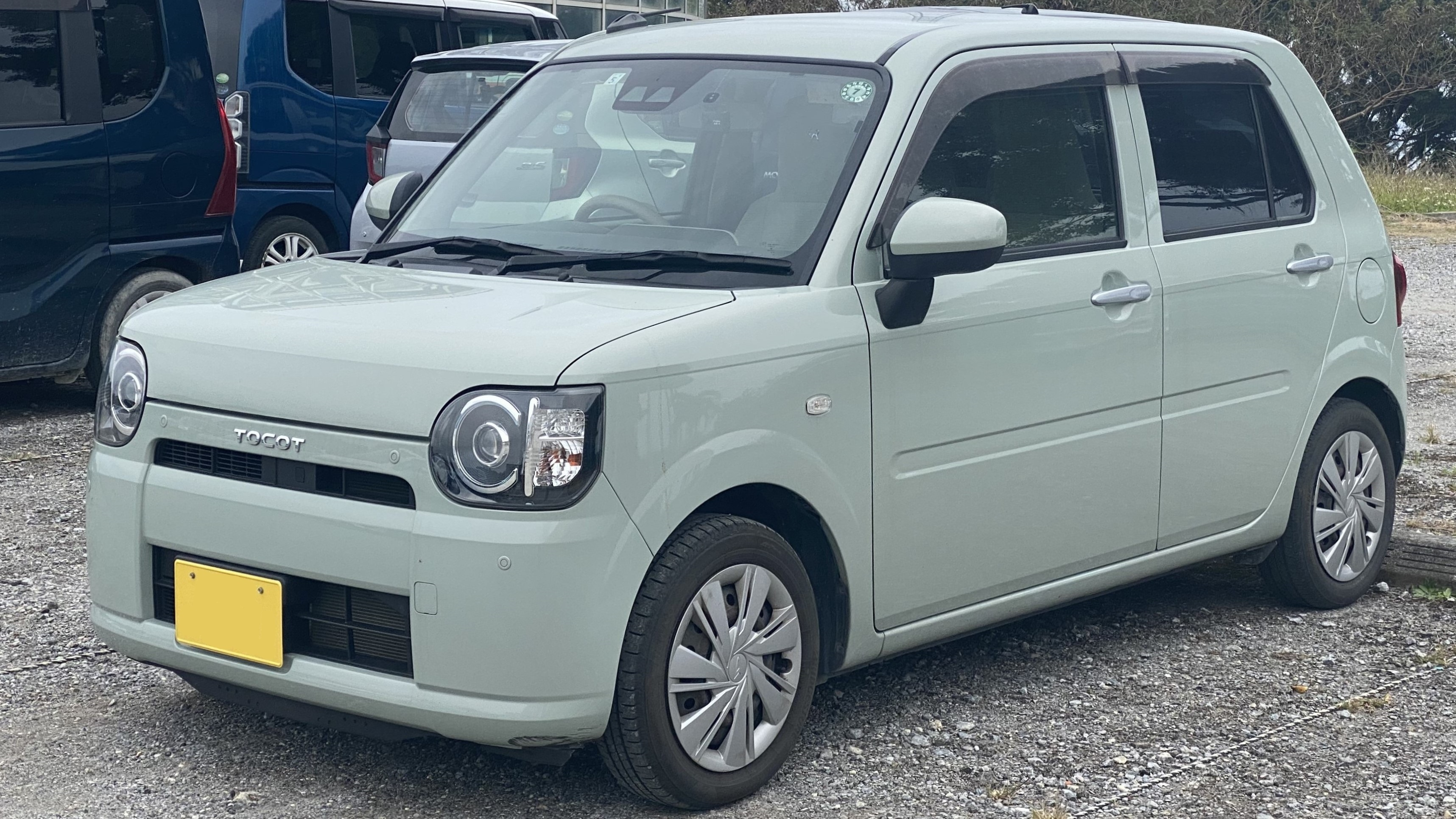
- 2018 Daihatsu Mira Tocot L SA III (LA550S)

Overview
- Manufacturer: Daihatsu
- Production: June 2018 – December 2023
- Assembly: Japan: Nakatsu, Ōita (Daihatsu Motor Kyushu)
- Designer: Shun Ohoka and Yukinobu Morioka

Body and chassis
- Class: Kei car
- Body style: 5-door hatchback
- Layout: Front-engine, front-wheel-drive; Front-engine, four-wheel-drive
- Related: Daihatsu Mira e:S (LA350)

Powertrain
- Engine: Petrol: 658 cc KF-VE I3
- Power output: 38 kW (51 hp; 52 PS)
- Transmission: CVT

Dimensions
- Wheelbase: 2,455 mm (96.7 in)
- Length: 3,395 mm (133.7 in)
- Width: 1,475 mm (58.1 in)
- Height: 1,530–1,540 mm (60.2–60.6 in)
- Kerb weight: 720–790 kg (1,587–1,742 lb)

Chronology
- Predecessor: Daihatsu Mira Cocoa Daihatsu Mira

The Daihatsu Mira Tocot (Japanese: ダイハツ・ミラトコット, Hepburn: Daihatsu Mira Tokotto) is a kei car built by the Japanese carmaker Daihatsu between 2018 and 2023 as the successor to the Mira Cocoa & Mira. Based on the LA350 series Mira e:S, its 658 cc KF-VE three-cylinder petrol engine produces 38 kW (51 hp; 52 PS) and 60 N⋅m (44 lb⋅ft) of torque.

The name "Tocot" is derived from phrases "To Character" (expression of one's ownness), "To Comfortableness" (safety, security and easiness of driving), and "To Convenience" (usability).

== Gallery ==
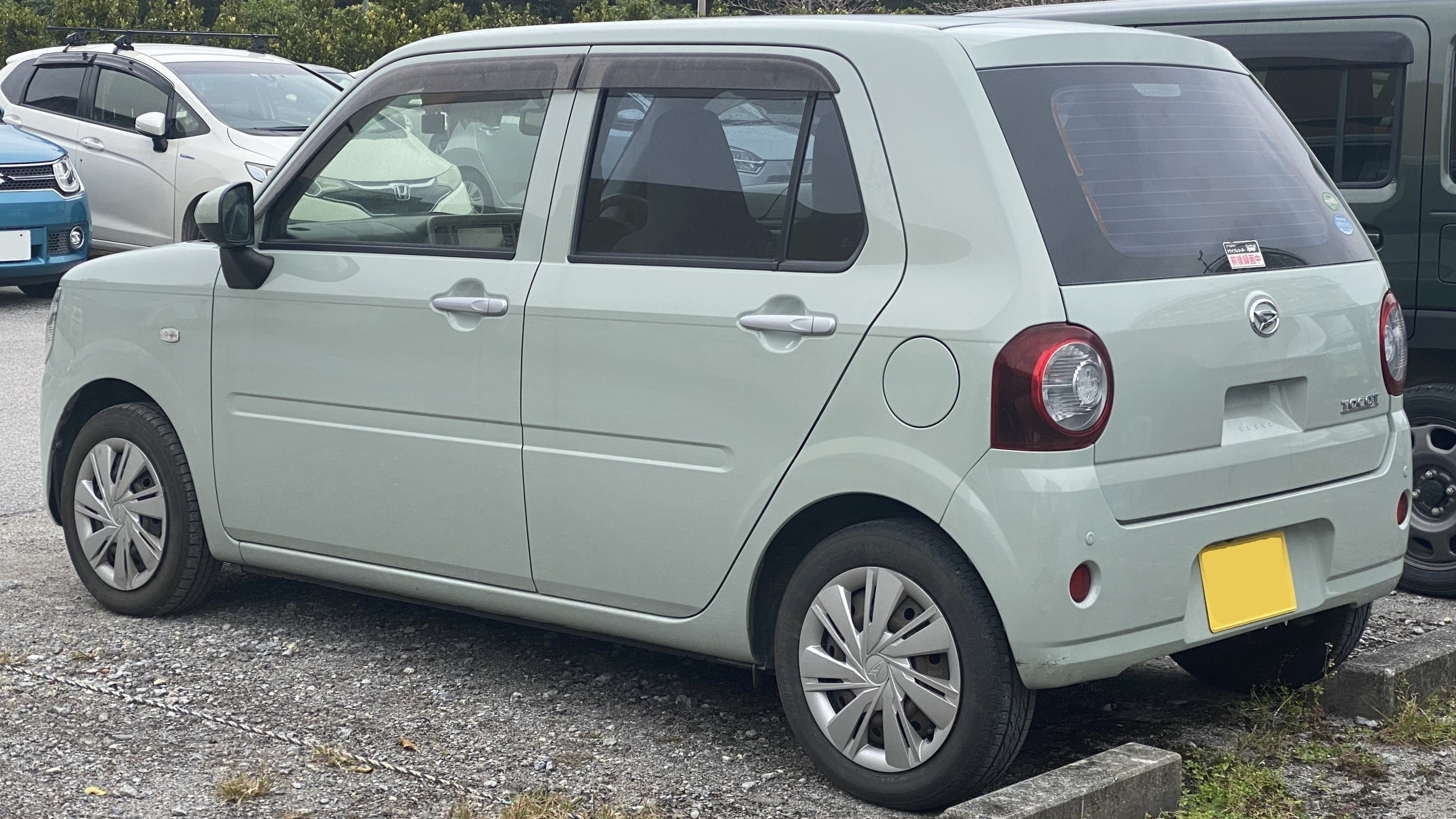
2018 Mira Tocot L SA III (LA550S)

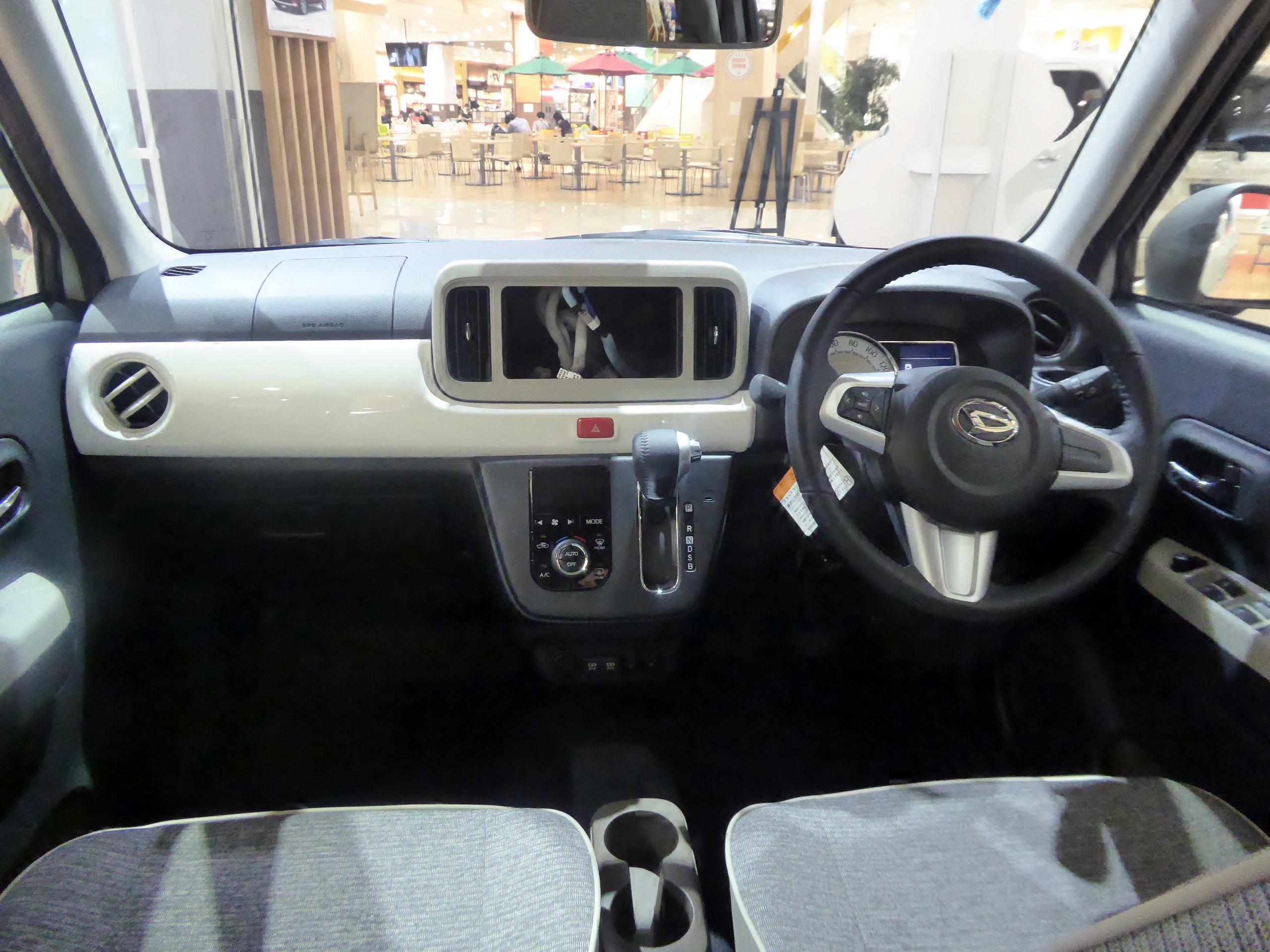
Interior
