= Daihatsu P5 =

Daihatsu P-5
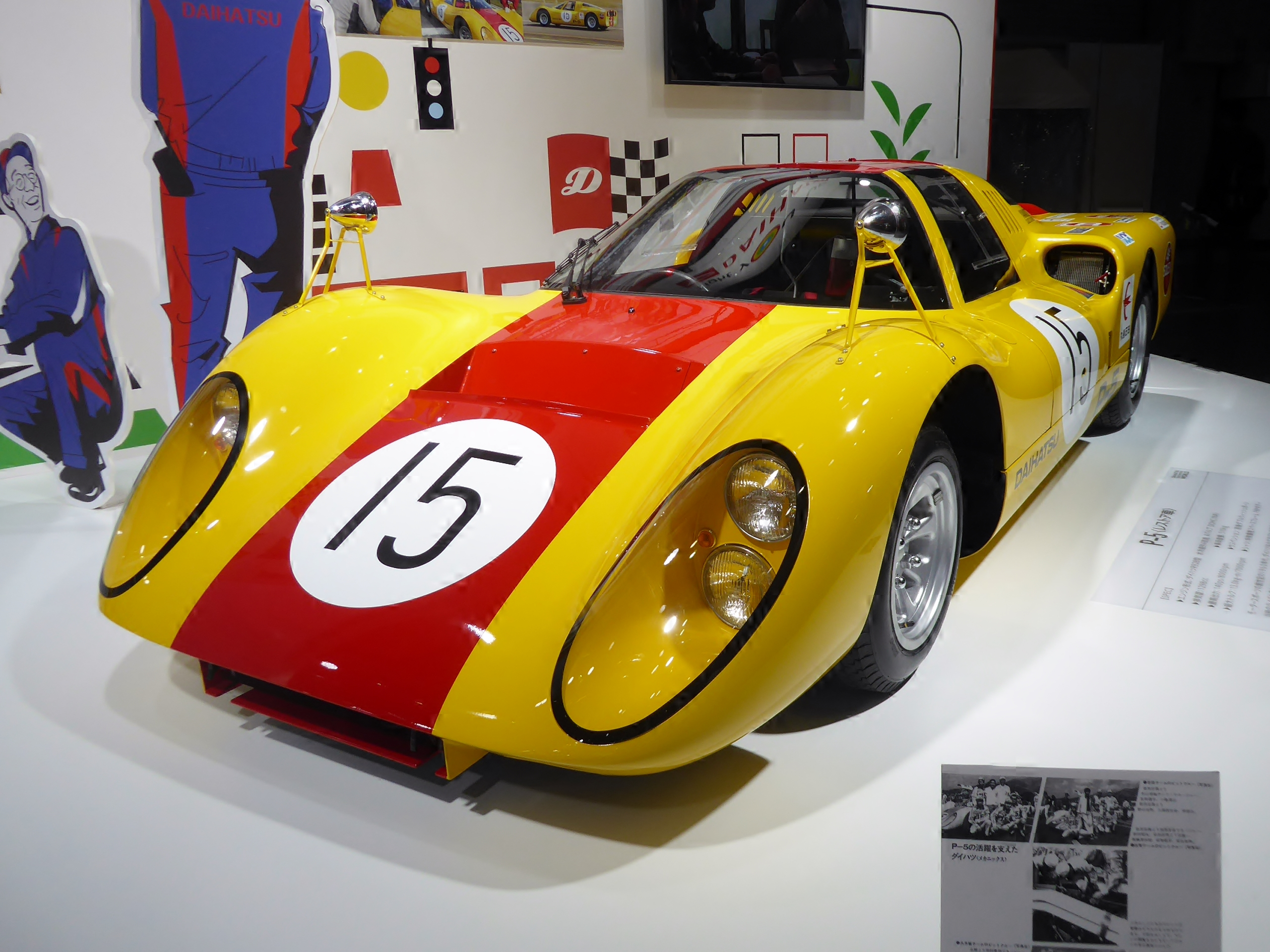
- Constructor: Daihatsu
- Predecessor: Daihatsu P-3

Technical specifications
- Chassis: Tubular frame
- Suspension (front): Double wishbone
- Suspension (rear): Multi-link (4-link)
- Length: 3,850 mm (151.6 in)
- Width: 1,550 mm (61.0 in)
- Height: 990 mm (39.0 in)
- Wheelbase: 2,250 mm (88.6 in)
- Engine: R92A/B 1,261–1,298 cc (77.0–79.2 cu in) DOHC 16-valve I4 naturally-aspirated rear engined
- Transmission: Hewland MK-IV 5-speed manual
- Weight: 510 kg (1,124.4 lb)
- Tyres: Dunlop R7

Competition history
- Notable drivers: (Japan) Hiroyuki Hisaki (Japan) Keizo Yabuki (Japan) Takao Yoshida (Japan) Takechi Yuzo
- Debut: 1967 Japanese Grand Prix
Races	Wins
?	1 (class)

The Daihatsu P-5 was a sports racing car built by Daihatsu in 1967. It was an evolution of the P-3, and featured a 1.3-litre twin-cam straight-four engine capable of producing around about 130-140 PS.

== History ==
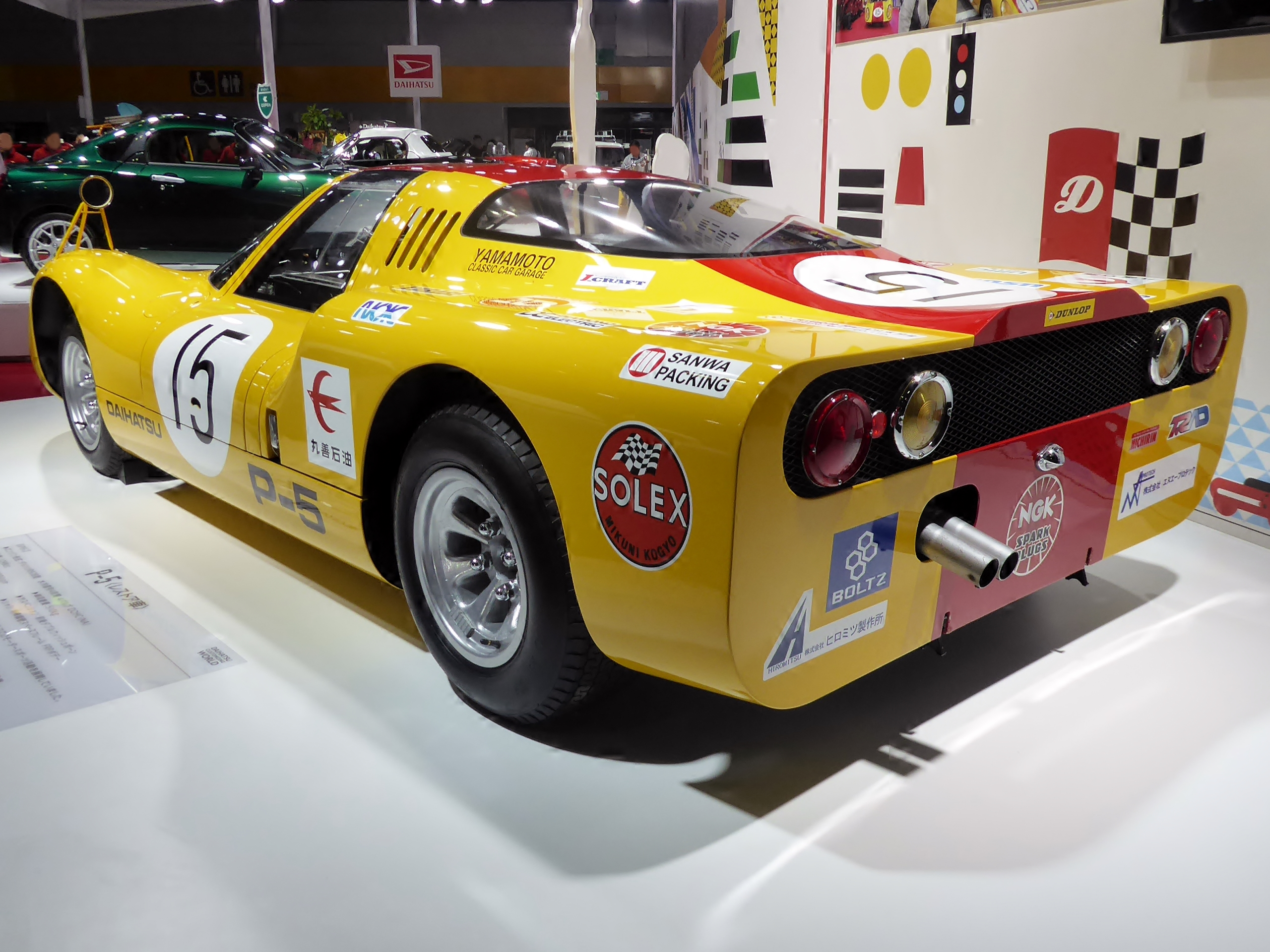
Rear view

The P-5 was an updated version of the P-3, but featured a bigger 1.3-litre straight-four engine, fitted in the rear of the car. The engine had double overhead camshafts and two carburettors, and was capable of producing up to 140 hp (104 kW; 142 PS). It was shown at the 14th Tokyo Motor Show in October 1967 as the Daihatsu P-5X.

Two P-5s were entered in the Japanese Grand Prix in 1967. It was entered in the 1000 km of Suzuka in 1968, finishing third. It was then run in the Japanese Grand Prix again, which was held at Fuji Speedway; the No.15 car won its class, and finished tenth overall. Toyota bought Daihatsu in 1969, but the car was used one last time; it finished second in the 1000 km of Suzuka that year.
