= Daihatsu Mira Cocoa =

Daihatsu Mira Cocoa (L675)
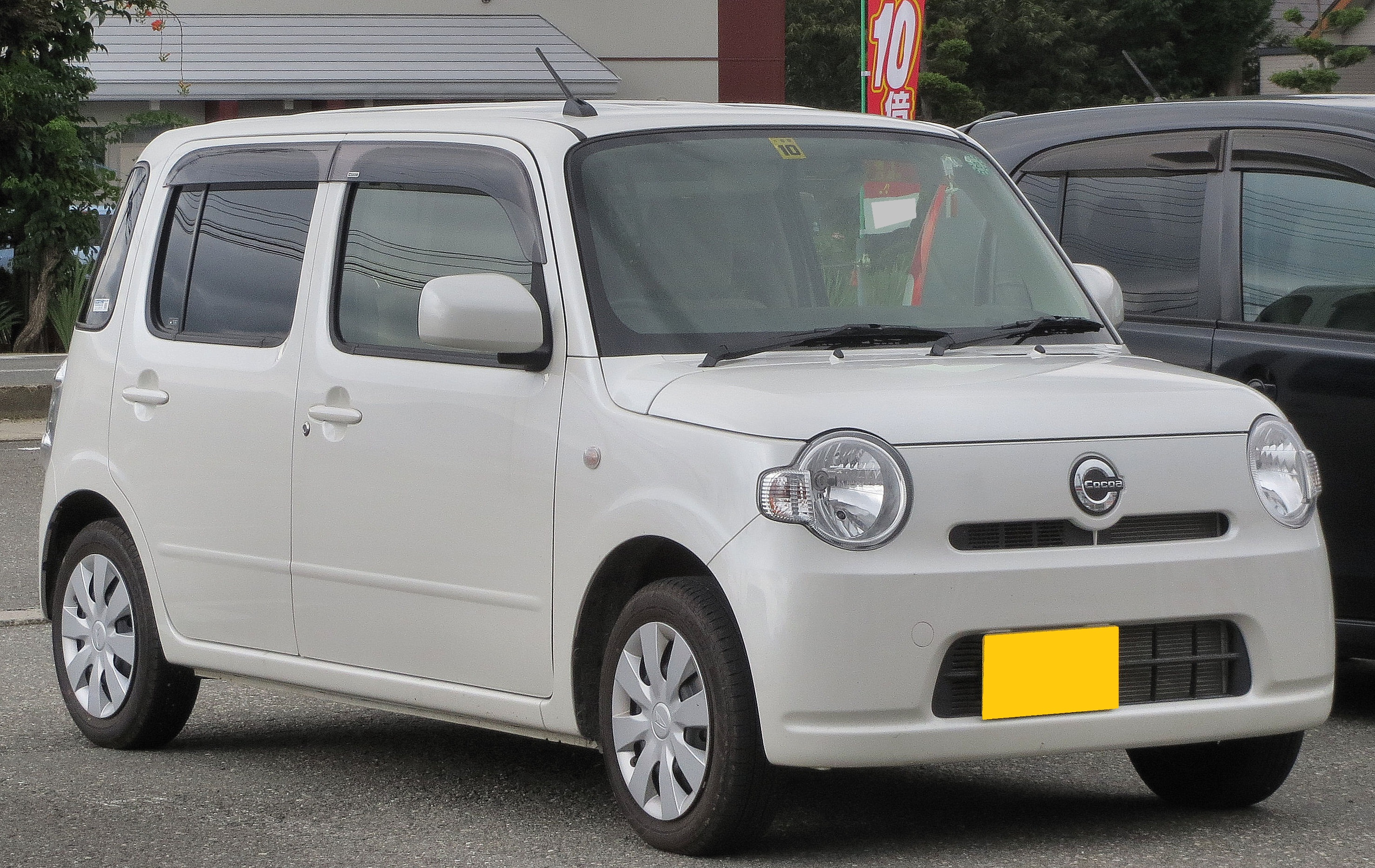
- Daihatsu Mira Cocoa L 4WD (L685S)

Overview
- Manufacturer: Daihatsu
- Production: August 2009 – March 2018
- Assembly: Japan: Nakatsu, Ōita (Daihatsu Motor Kyushu)
- Designer: Takahiro Masuda and Taku Iwamura

Body and chassis
- Class: Kei car
- Body style: 5-door hatchback
- Layout: Front-engine, front-wheel-drive; Front-engine, four-wheel-drive
- Related: Daihatsu Mira (L275); Daihatsu Move Conte

Powertrain
- Engine: Petrol: 658 cc KF-VE I3
- Power output: 38 kW (52 PS; 51 hp)
- Transmission: 4-speed automatic; CVT

Dimensions
- Wheelbase: 2,490 mm (98.0 in)
- Length: 3,395 mm (133.7 in)
- Width: 1,475 mm (58.1 in)
- Height: 1,530–1,560 mm (60.2–61.4 in)
- Kerb weight: 780–860 kg (1,720–1,896 lb)

Chronology
- Predecessor: Daihatsu Mira Gino
- Successor: Daihatsu Mira Tocot

The Daihatsu Mira Cocoa (Japanese: ダイハツ・ミラココア, Hepburn: Daihatsu Mira Kokoa) is a kei car built by the Japanese carmaker Daihatsu from 2009 to 2018. Based on the L275 series Mira, it replaced the Mira Gino in the Daihatsu's lineup, complete with retro-inspired styling. With its cute, "warm and modern" design, Daihatsu was explicitly aiming at female buyers. It was launched in August 2009 and went on sale in September. The name "Cocoa" comes from hot cocoa and was intended to convey a warm, relaxing atmosphere.

The grade levels offered were L, X, Plus L, Plus X and range-topping Plus G, all powered by the 38 kW (52 PS) 658 cc KF-VE three-cylinder petrol engine. The higher equipped Plus models were fitted with roof rails, and received more comfortable seat fabrics, fuller instrumentation, and a split-folding rear seat rather than the single-folding seat of the L and X models. Special editions and two-tone variants were added later in the run. The Cocoa's main competitor was the Suzuki Alto Lapin, also with distinctly retro styling. The production of the Mira Cocoa as well as the regular Mira of this generation ended in March 2018. The Mira Cocoa was replaced by the Mira Tocot.

== Gallery ==
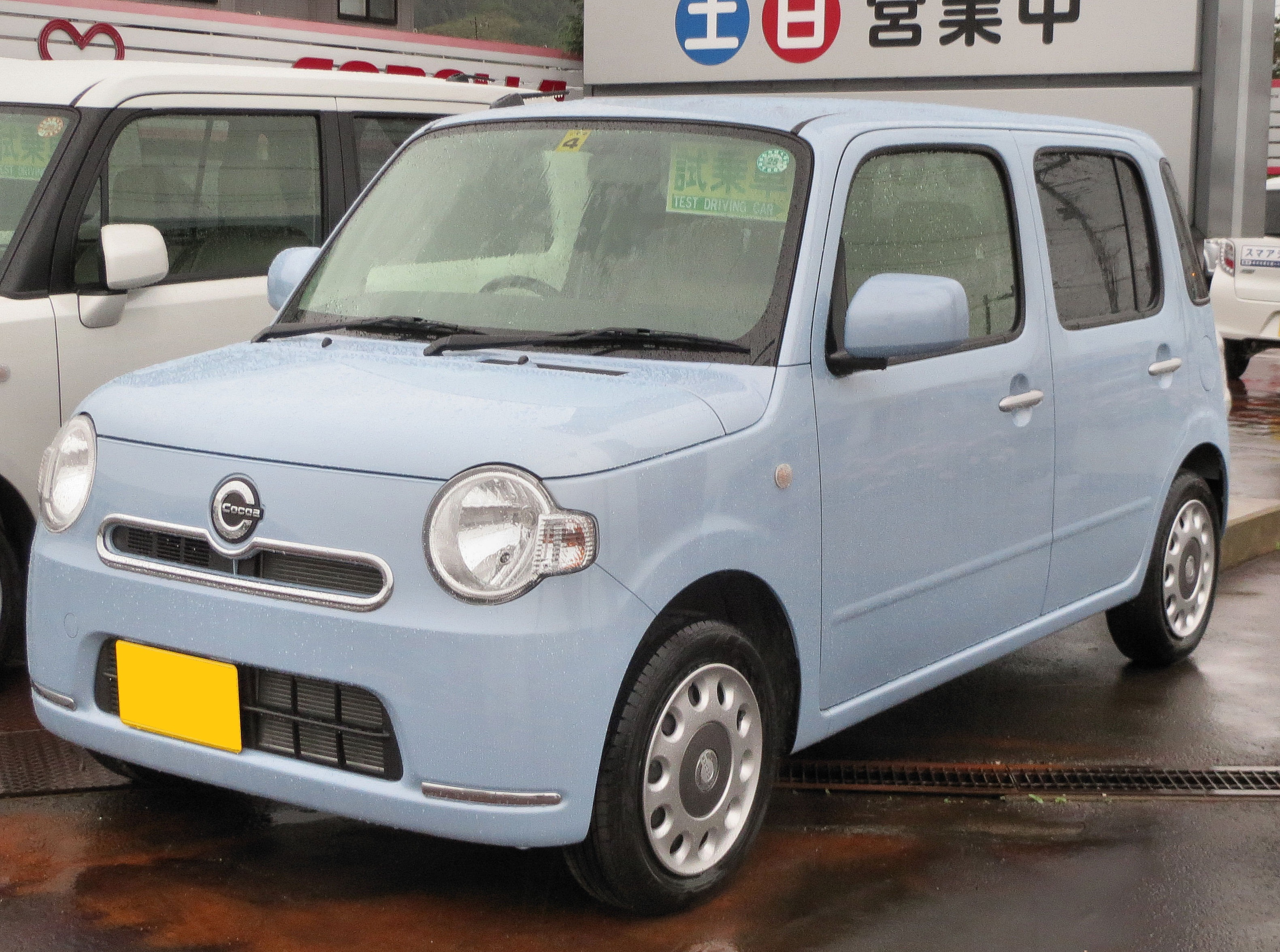
Mira Cocoa X 4WD (L685S)

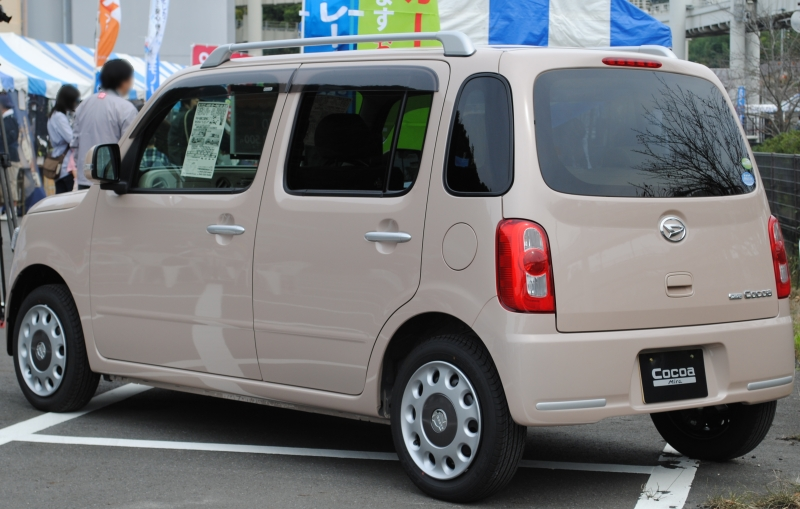
Rear view

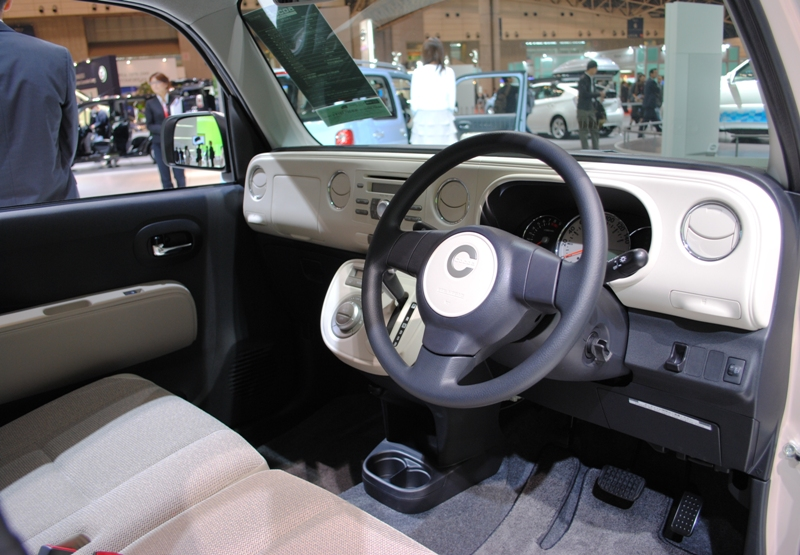
Interior
