= Daihatsu Taft =

Automotive nameplate by Daihatsu

The Daihatsu Taft (Japanese: ダイハツ・タフト, Hepburn: Daihatsu Tafuto) is an automobile nameplate used by the Japanese automobile manufacturer Daihatsu since 1974 for three different off-road oriented vehicles:

- Daihatsu Taft (F10), a mini off-road vehicle built from 1974 to 1984
- Daihatsu Taft (F70), a rebadged Rugger sold in Indonesia from 1984 to 2007
- Daihatsu Taft (LA900), a crossover-styled kei car built since 2020
