= Daihatsu =

Japanese automotive manufacturer

Daihatsu Motor Co., Ltd.

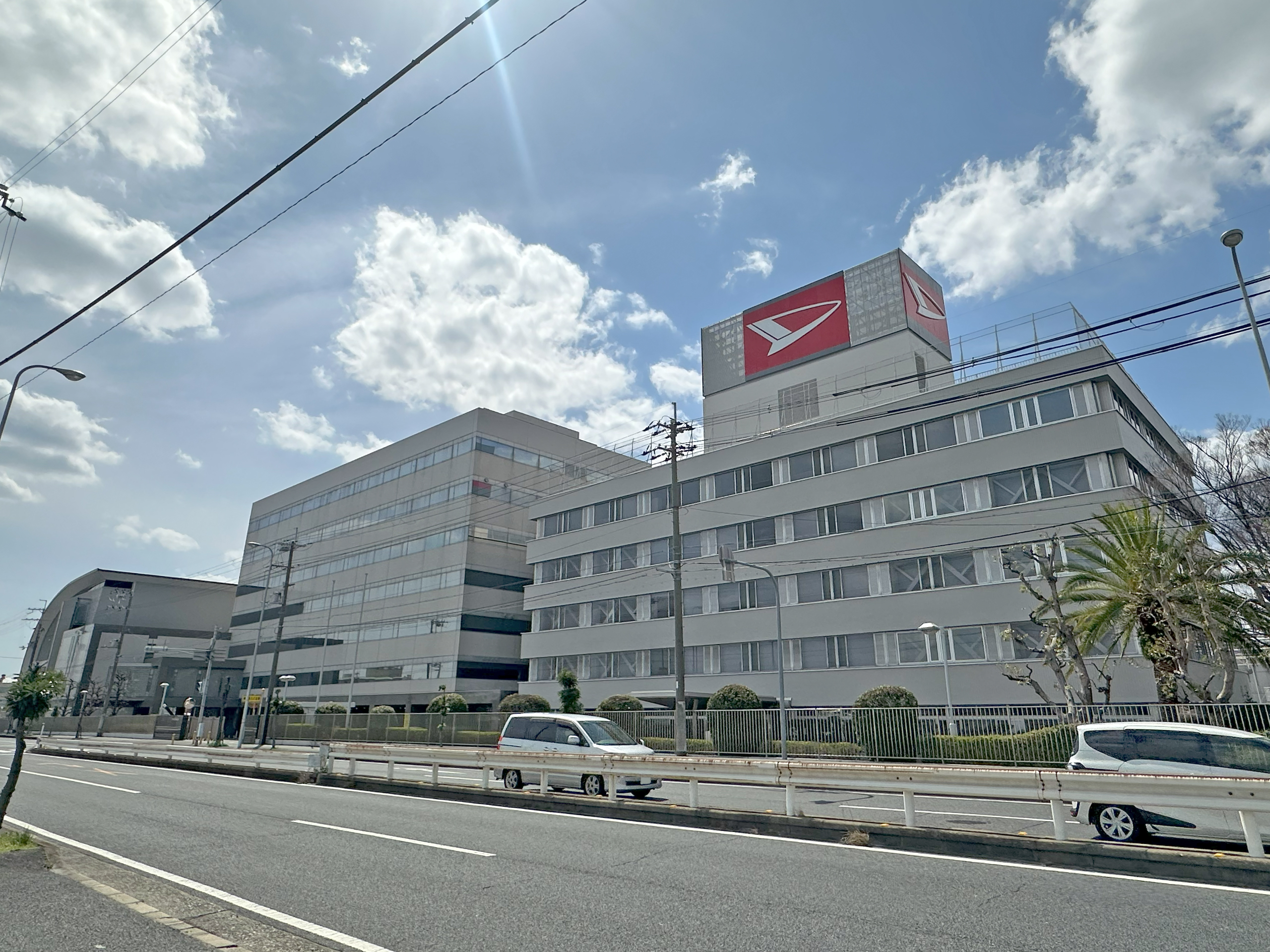
- Daihatsu headquarters in Ikeda, Osaka
- Native name: ダイハツ工業株式会社
- Romanized name: Daihatsu Kōgyō Kabushiki-gaisha
- Type: Subsidiary
- Industry: Automotive
- Predecessor: Hatsudoki Seizo Co., Ltd (1907–1951)
- Founded: 1 March 1951; 75 years ago
- Founders: Saneyasu Oka; Zenjiro Takeuchi; Yoshiaki Yasunaga; Seishiro Tsurumi; Masashi Kuwabara
- Headquarters: Ikeda, Osaka, Japan
- Area served: Japan; Indonesia; Malaysia
- Key people: Masahiro Inoue (president)
- Products: Automobiles, engines
- Production output: ▲1,787,991 vehicles (1,477,462 excluding Perodua) (Note: The FY (Fiscal Year) 2022 as reported by Daihatsu is from April 1, 2022 to March 30, 2023.) (FY2022)
- Revenue: ▲¥1,493 billion (FY2022)
- Operating income: ▼¥38 billion (FY2022)
- Net income: ▼¥77 billion (FY2022)
- Total assets: ▲¥944 billion (FY2022)
- Total equity: ▼¥387 billion (FY2022)
- Number of employees: 12,508 (April 2023)
- Parent: Toyota Motor Corporation
- Subsidiaries: Astra Daihatsu Motor (61.7%); Perodua (25%)
- Website: daihatsu.com

Daihatsu Motor Co., Ltd. (Japanese: ダイハツ工業株式会社, Hepburn: Daihatsu Kōgyō Kabushiki-gaisha) is a Japanese automobile manufacturer headquartered in Ikeda, Osaka Prefecture, Japan.

One of the oldest surviving Japanese internal combustion engine manufacturers, the company was known for building three-wheeled vehicles and off-road vehicles, while currently the company offers a range of kei car models, along with kei trucks, kei vans and other larger small cars in Japan. Because of the company's focus on kei cars, 70 percent of Daihatsu drivers in Japan are female. The company produces entry-level compact cars in Japan and Southeast Asia, which are often supplied to global emerging markets under the Toyota brand.

As of 2023, Daihatsu's presence has been limited to Japan and Indonesia under the Daihatsu brand, and Malaysia under the Perodua brand, where the company has significant research and development resources, manufacturing facilities and sales operations.

Since August 2016, the company has been a wholly-owned subsidiary of the Toyota Motor Corporation. As of 2021, Daihatsu accounts for four percent of Toyota Group's total vehicle sales.

== Name ==
The name "Daihatsu" is a combination of the first symbol (kanji) of Ōsaka (大) and the first of the word "engine manufacture" (発動機製造, hatsudōki seizō). In the new combination the reading of the "大" is changed from ō to dai, giving dai hatsu.

== History ==
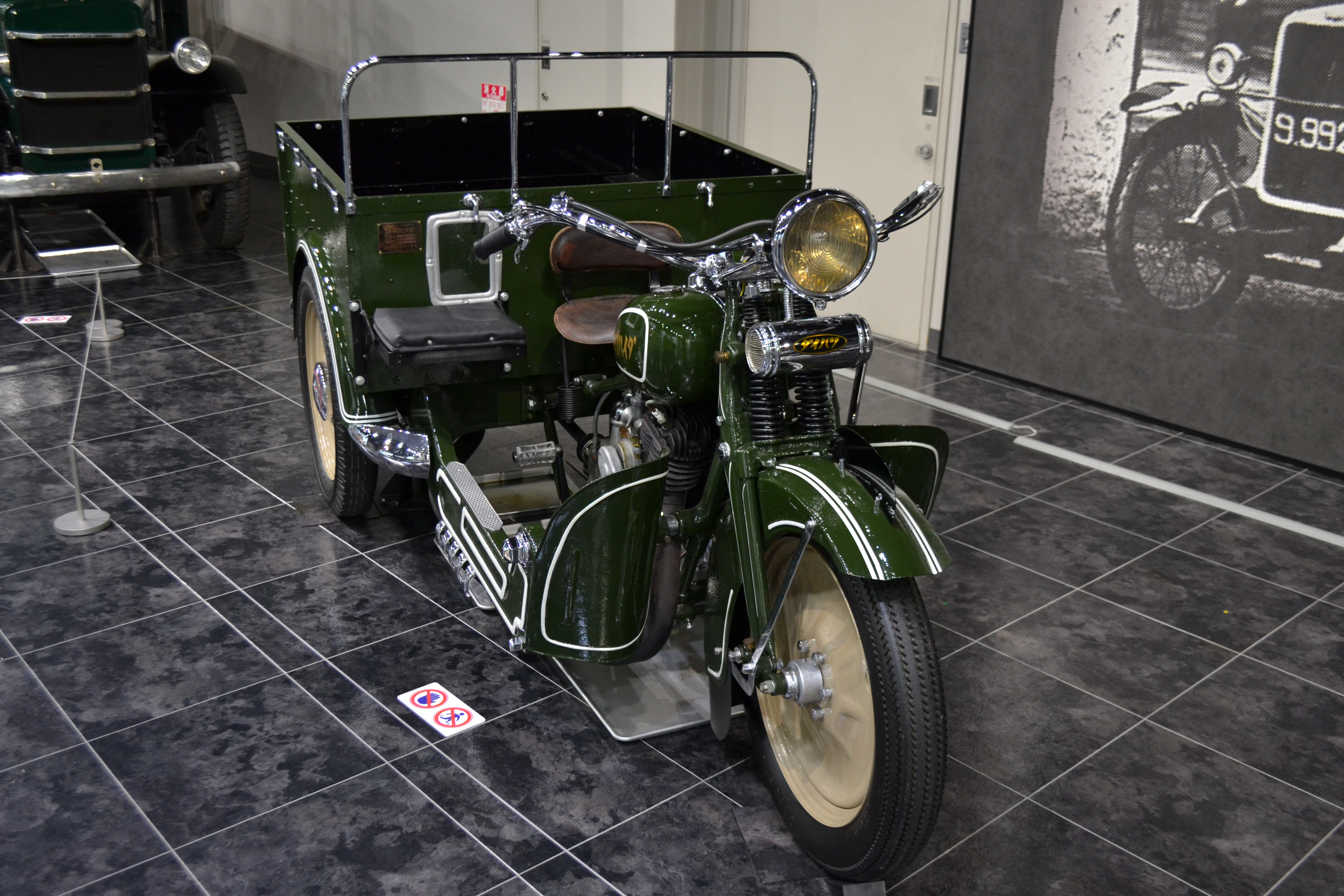
Hatsudoki SA-6, 1937

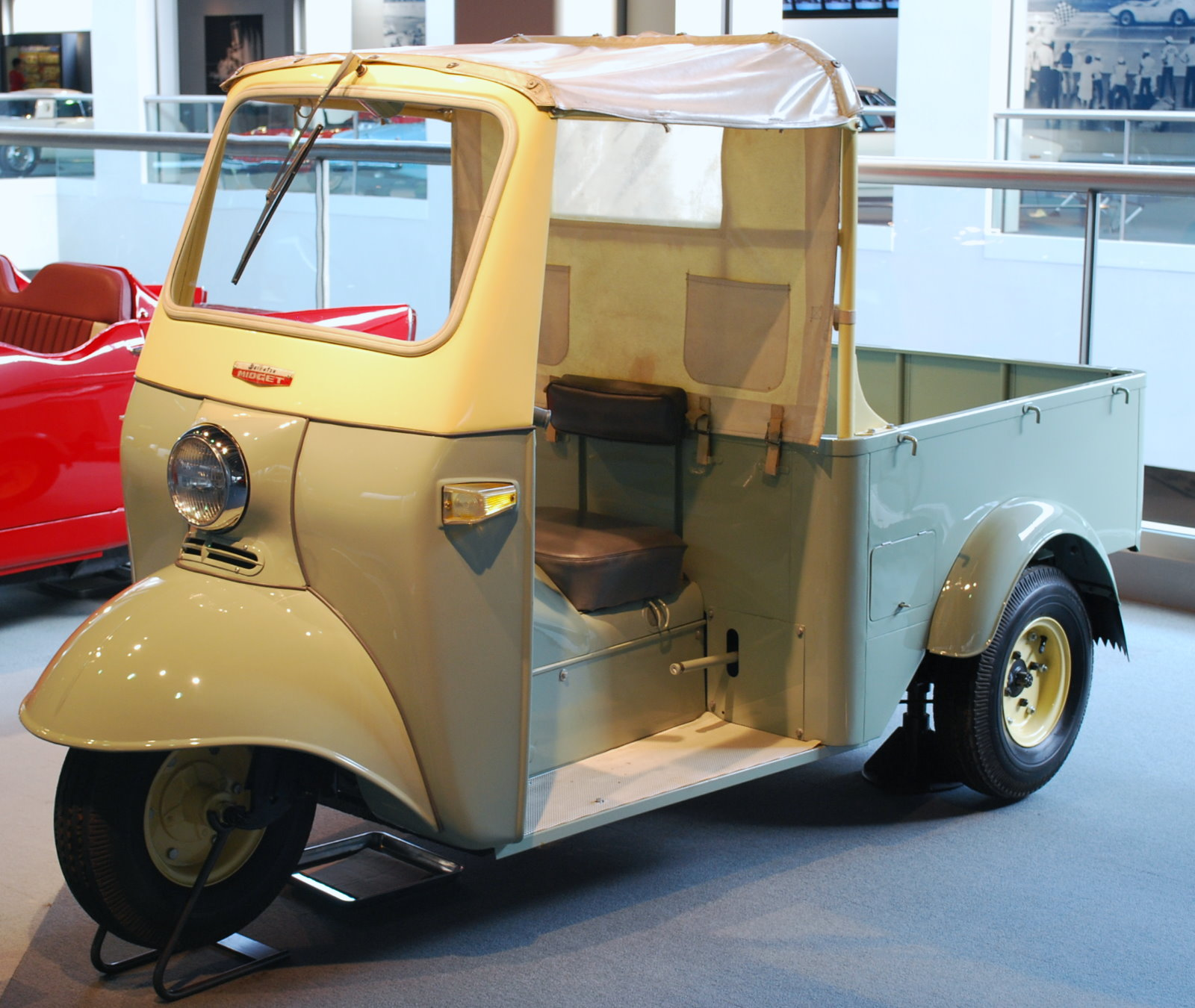
Daihatsu Midget, 1957

Daihatsu was officially formed on March 1, 1951, as a successor to Hatsudoki Seizo Co. Ltd, founded in 1907, as part of Hatsudoki's major restructuring. Hatsudoki's formation was largely influenced by the Engineering Department's faculty of Osaka University, to develop a gasoline-powered engine for small, stationary power plants. From the beginning of the company until 1930, when a prototype three-wheeler truck was considered and proposed, Hatsudoki's focus was largely steam engines for Japanese National Railways and included rail carriages for passenger transportation. The company then focused on railroad diesel engines, working with Niigata Engineering and Shinko Engineering Co., Ltd. Before the company began to manufacture automobiles, their primary Japanese competitor was Yanmar for diesel engines that were not installed in a commercial truck to provide motivation.

The company's decision to focus on automobile production and related technologies was influenced by the early days of automobile manufacturing in Japan during the late 1920s and 1930s, when both Ford and General Motors had opened factories in Japan and enjoyed a considerable market share. Ford opened a factory at Yokohama in March 1925 and in 1927 GM opened Osaka Assembly until both factories were appropriated by the Imperial Japanese Government before World War II.

During the 1960s, Daihatsu began exporting its range to Europe, where it did not have major sales success until well into the 1980s. In Japan, the majority of Daihatsu models occupies the kei car segment.

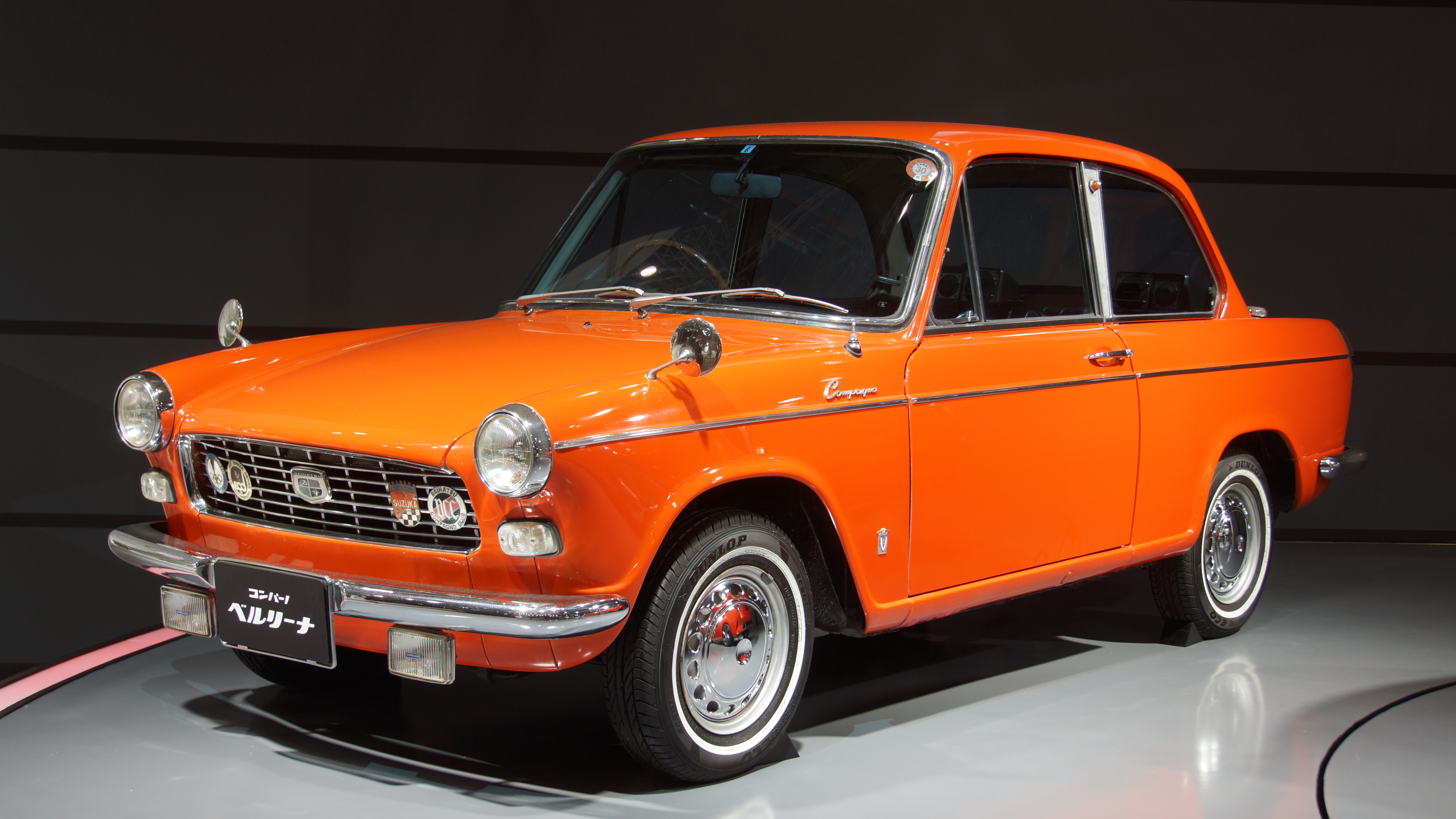
Daihatsu Compagno, 1960s

Daihatsu was an independent automaker until Toyota Motor Corporation became a major shareholder in 1967 as the Japanese government intended to open up the domestic market. According to Toyota, it was first approached by Sanwa Bank, banker of Daihatsu. In 1995, Toyota increased its shareholding in the company from 16.8% to 33.4% by acquiring shares from other shareholders: banks and insurance companies. At the time, the company was producing mini-vehicles and some small cars under contract for Toyota. Toyota, by owning more than a one-third stake, would be able to veto shareholder resolutions at the annual meeting. In 1998, Toyota increased its holding in the company to 51.2% by purchasing shares from its major shareholders including financial institutions.

Following the 2008 financial crisis, Daihatsu's sales in Europe plummeted, from 58,000 in 2007 to 12,000 in 2011. Daihatsu pulled out of the European market by 2013, citing the persistently strong yen, which makes it difficult for the company to make a profit from its export business.

In August 2011, Daihatsu invested 20 billion yen ($238.9 million) in Indonesia to build a factory that produces low-cost cars under the Low Cost Green Car scheme. The construction had been initialized on 70,000 square meters on May 27, 2011 and started operations at the end of 2012, producing up to 100,000 cars per year.

In August 2016, Daihatsu became a wholly owned subsidiary of Toyota Motor Corporation. In January 2017, Daihatsu and Toyota jointly established an internal company to develop compact vehicles for emerging markets called the 'Emerging-market Compact Car Company'. Under the internal company, Daihatsu is responsible of product planning and quality planning of the vehicles, while both Toyota and Daihatsu are jointly responsible of product and business planning. To support the company, Toyota Motor Asia Pacific Engineering and Manufacturing Co., Ltd. (TMAP-EM) in Thailand was renamed to Toyota Daihatsu Engineering and Manufacturing Co., Ltd. (TDEM).

In October 2016, Daihatsu and Toyota announced a new vehicle architecture called the Daihatsu New Global Architecture (DNGA) was being developed. The second-generation Mira e:S was revealed as the first DNGA model in 2017, although the company later revised the definition of DNGA and launched the fourth-generation Tanto claimed it as the first DNGA model instead.

From 2020 to 2022, Daihatsu trained employees from less-profitable sister company Toyota Motor East Japan to improve the latter's systems on development and production of small cars.

On 1 May 2024, the Emerging Markets Compact Car Company, which had been established across Toyota Motor Corporation and Daihatsu in 2016 was abolished, and its product planning functions were transferred to the Toyota Compact Car Company, with Daihatsu being as a contractor. In June of the same year, Toyota Daihatsu Engineering and Manufacturing in Thailand was moved under Toyota Motor Asia Headquarters, headed by Masahiko Maeda, and the company name was changed to Toyota Motor Asia, dropping the Daihatsu name.

=== Safety scandal ===
In April 2023, Daihatsu was found to have rigged safety tests for 88,000 cars, most of which were sold as Toyota Yaris to Thailand, Mexico and Gulf Cooperation Council countries. The door trim of side-collision test cars was notched in order to minimize the risk of injury, but the modification was not applied to production vehicles.

In December 2023, the company halted shipments of 64 models, including products sold by Mazda, Subaru, and two dozen models branded as Toyotas, after safety investigations uncovered misconduct far greater in scope than previously expected. In some models, the airbag control unit used in testing was different from the part installed on vehicles sold to the public. Results of speed tests and headrest impact tests had also been falsified. The cases went back as far as 1989 and became particularly prevalent after 2014. Affected markets included Japan as well as Bolivia, Cambodia, Chile, Ecuador, Indonesia, Malaysia, Mexico, Peru, Thailand, Uruguay, and Vietnam. The company announced that it would shut down all four of its manufacturing plants in Japan until the end of January 2024, but production was halted until February through April 2024 when the shipment ban was also lifted.

== Company timeline ==
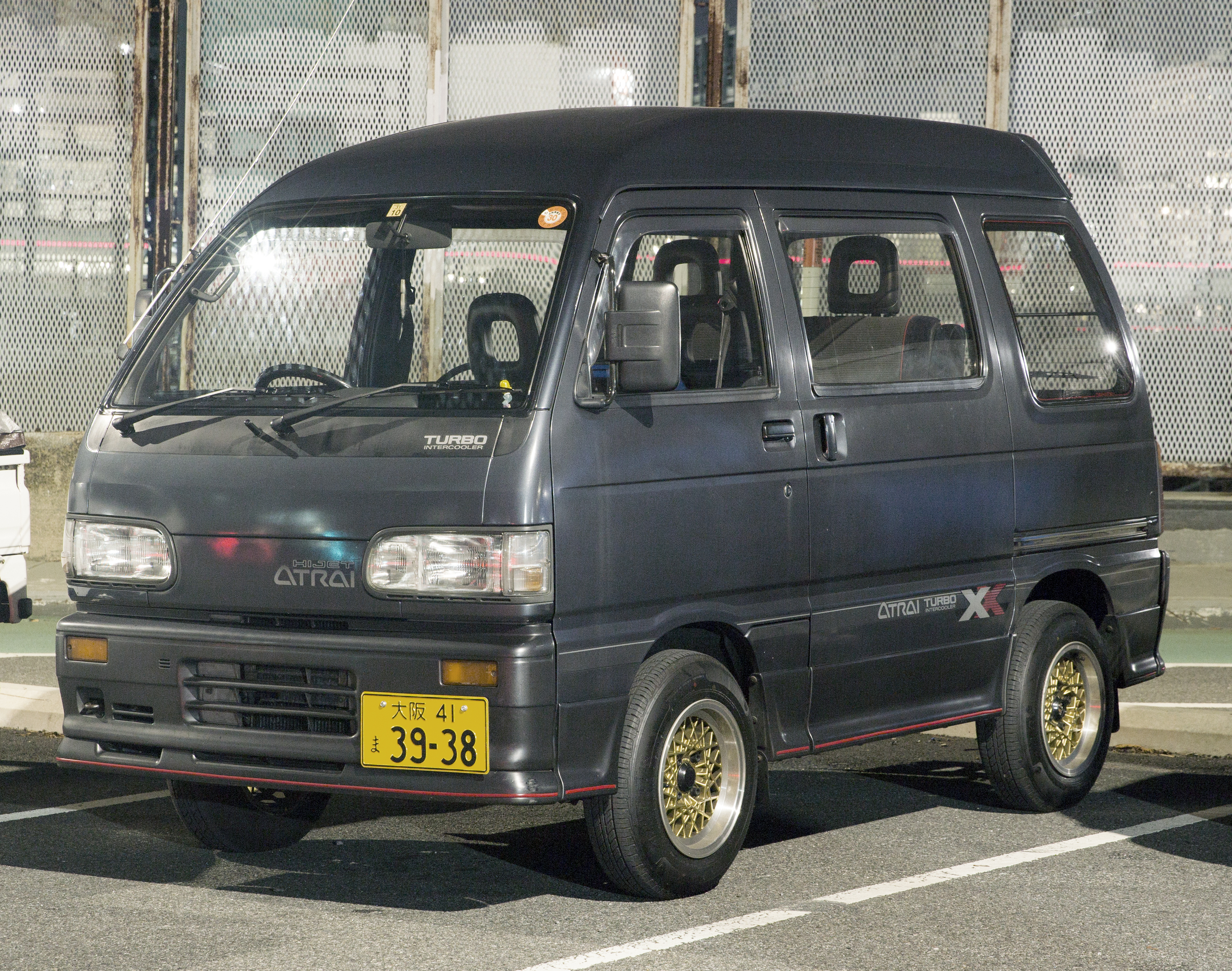
Daihatsu Atrai, 1989

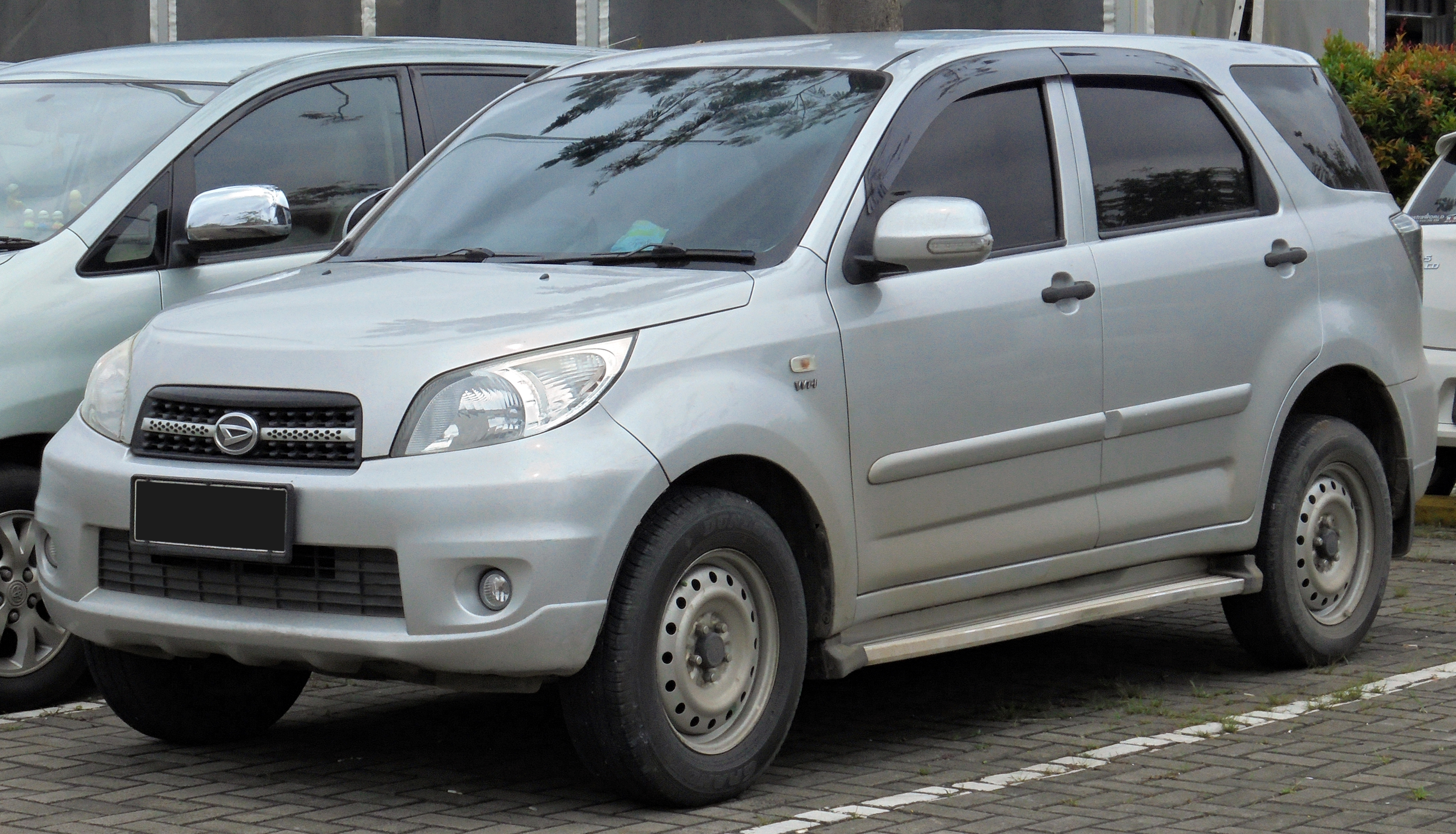
Daihatsu Terios, 2011, Indonesian market

The company was founded in 1907 as Hatsudoki Seizo Co., Ltd, but was officially incorporated as Daihatsu Motor Co., Ltd on March 1, 1951. In 1963, the company introduced the Daihatsu Compagno, a car that utilized multiple body styles on one platform, and the long-running "D" logo was introduced. One year later, on September 1, 1964, Daihatsu built its millionth vehicle. In 1965, the Daihatsu Compagno Berlina was launched in the United Kingdom, marking the first time a Japanese car was marketed in the UK.

In 1967, Daihatsu began cooperating with Toyota Motor Corporation, and by 1968, the company celebrated the production of its one millionth Daihatsu kei car. The two millionth Daihatsu was built in 1969. In 1971, Daihatsu launched the first generation of its Delta Truck model in Japan, a Toyota-influenced six-ton cargo truck. By 1975, Daihatsu began supplying diesel engines to the SEMAL motor vehicle company of Portugal for their Portaro and Tagus 4X4 off-road vehicles.

The 1980s saw significant milestones for Daihatsu, including the production of its three millionth kei car by 1980. In 1987, the company entered the US automotive market with the Hijet, followed by the introduction of the Rocky and Charade in 1988. However, in 1992, Daihatsu ceased sales in the US and halted production of US-spec vehicles.

In 1998, Toyota acquired a controlling interest in Daihatsu, taking 51.2% of the company. Daihatsu's presence in Europe also started to dwindle in the 2010s, with the company announcing that sales of its vehicles would cease in Europe by January 31, 2013. In 2011, Daihatsu invested 20 billion yen (approximately $238.9 million) in a factory in Indonesia to produce low-cost cars.

In 2016, Toyota purchased Daihatsu's remaining assets, making Daihatsu a wholly owned subsidiary.

== Leadership ==
- Mizuo Takezaki (1951–1955)
- Koishi Yuji (1955–1968)
- Yoshikichi Ise (1968–1975)
- Ohara Sakae (1975–1982)
- Tomoko Eguchi (1982–1988)
- Jiro Osuga (1988–1992)
- Takashi Toyozumi (1992–1995)
- Takeichi Shingu (1995–2000)
- Takaya Yamada (2000–2005)
- Teruyuki Minoura (2005–2010)
- Ina Koichi (2010–2013)
- Masanori Mitsui (2013–2017)
- Soichiro Okudaira (2017–2024)
- Masahiro Inoue (2024–present)

== Export markets ==
Daihatsu's first export was in 1953, and by 1980 half a million Daihatsu vehicles had been exported. In 1979 a European main office was established in Brussels, tasked with controlling and expanding Western European exports. Since the late 1990s, its exports have been steadily contracting. This has been partially offset by the sale of Daihatsu vehicles through the Toyota channel, and the sale of technology to Malaysia's Perodua. Daihatsu has also supplied cars under different badges to various automakers in the past. The company currently provides engines and transmissions to Malaysia's Perodua, which manufactures and markets rebadged Daihatsu cars locally, and sold a small number of Perodua cars in the United Kingdom and Ireland until 2012.

In February 1992 it began exporting cars to North America and from 1994 to 1999 it exported the Terios and Cuore models to Brazil. With the rise of the US currency and the Asian crisis, the brand stopped exporting to Brazil.

=== Asia and Oceania ===
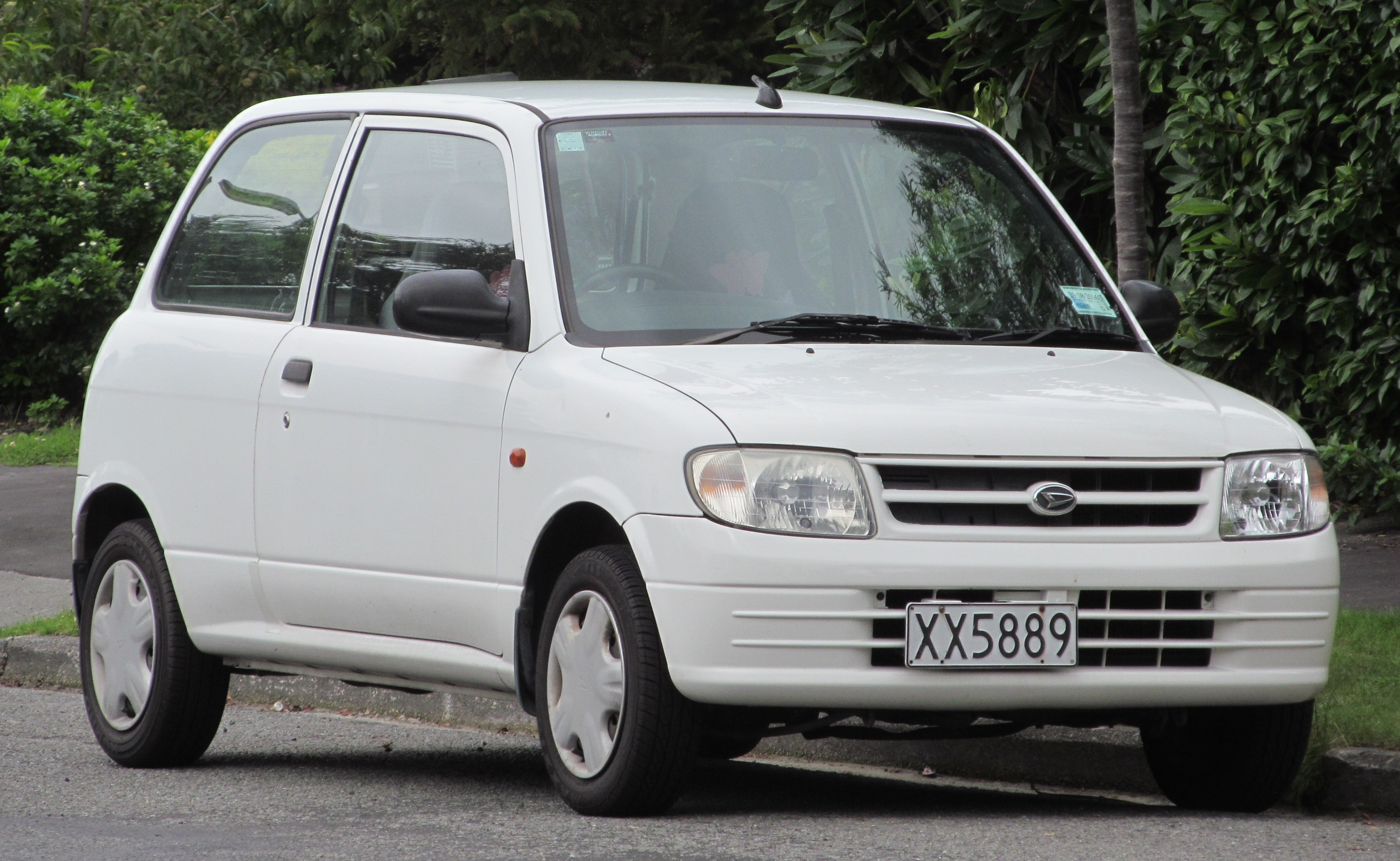
1999 Daihatsu Mira in New Zealand

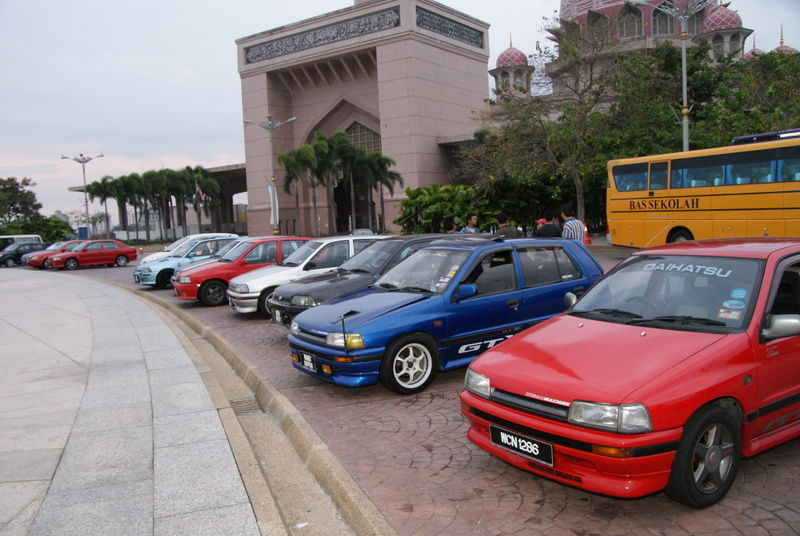
Gathering of Daihatsu Charade GTti hot hatches in Malaysia

Following the 1997 Asian financial crisis, Daihatsu closed their plants in Thailand and withdrew from the market entirely. Until withdrawing in March 1998 they had mostly been selling the Mira range in Thailand; the Mira was also built there with certain local modifications.

Daihatsu had formerly sold Charades and Miras in Malaysia since it first began operations in the country as a joint venture in 1980; after the launch of Perodua, Daihatsu's Malaysian operations were scaled down to concentrate exclusively on the commercial vehicles market, selling its Delta and Gran Max commercial truck chassis.

In Indonesia, Daihatsu remains a major player as a partner of Astra Daihatsu Motor, overseeing the local assembly of a wide range of private and commercial Daihatsu models for the Indonesia market since 1992. Astra Daihatsu Motor is the largest car producer in Indonesia by production output and installed capacity, and Daihatsu is the second best-selling car brand in Indonesia behind Toyota.

It was reported on March 31, 2005, that Toyota would withdraw Daihatsu from the Australian market after sales fell heavily in the years leading up, in spite of the overall new-car market in Australia growing 7%. Daihatsu ended its Australian operations in March 2006 after almost 40 years there. At the time the marque sold the Charade, Copen, Delta, Sirion and Terios models.

Toyota New Zealand announced on April 8, 2013 that sales of new Daihatsu vehicles in the country would cease by the end of the year, citing a lack of products that would comply with future NZ regulatory standards. No additional new vehicles were being imported as of the announcement date.

=== Americas ===
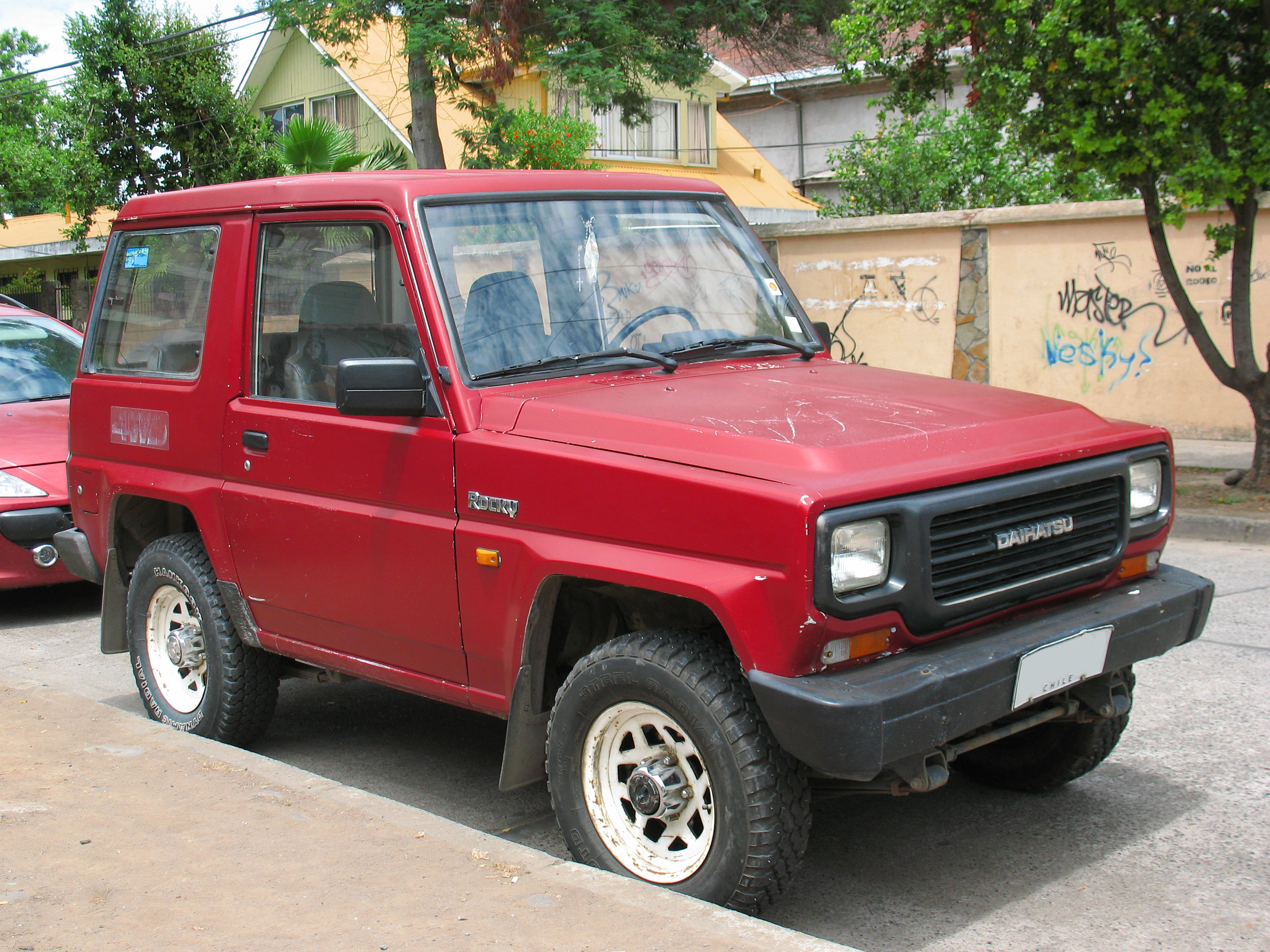
1992 Daihatsu Rocky in Chile

Daihatsu's operations in Chile, where Daihatsu is well known for its 1970s models such as the Charade or Cuore, were also threatened after low sales in 2004 and 2005. Toyota has stated that it intended to persist in the Chilean market, where only the Terios model was available until it was rebranded as the Toyota Rush in August 2016, as Daihatsu left that market.

In Trinidad and Tobago, Daihatsu has had a market presence since 1958 when its Mark I Midget was a popular choice among market tradesmen. From 1978 until 2001, a local dealer marketed the Charmant, Rocky, Fourtrak, and then later, the Terios and Grand Move which were popular. The Delta chassis remained popular from its introduction in 1985 until today. Toyota Trinidad and Tobago Ltd. (a wholly owned subsidiary of Toyota Japan) now markets Daihatsu Terios, YRV and Sirion under stiff competition.

In the United States, Daihatsus were marketed from 1988 until 1992 but were hampered by the 1990s recession, and that their products had very little impact as the company's compact and fuel economic cars did not align with the perceived needs of American customers. Only the Charade and the Rocky were sold. Beginning in 1987, Daihatsu also sold the Hijet in the United States as an off-road only utility vehicle.

Daihatsu and Bombardier Inc. had been planning to open an assembly plant for the Charade in Canada in 1989, with the ultimate goal of building a small car of Bombardier's design to market in North America. These plans didn't eventuate. After Daihatsu's withdrawal from the US market, Toyota, which had recently purchased a controlling interest in Daihatsu, continued to provide after-sales support for existing Daihatsu customers through at least 2002.

=== Europe ===
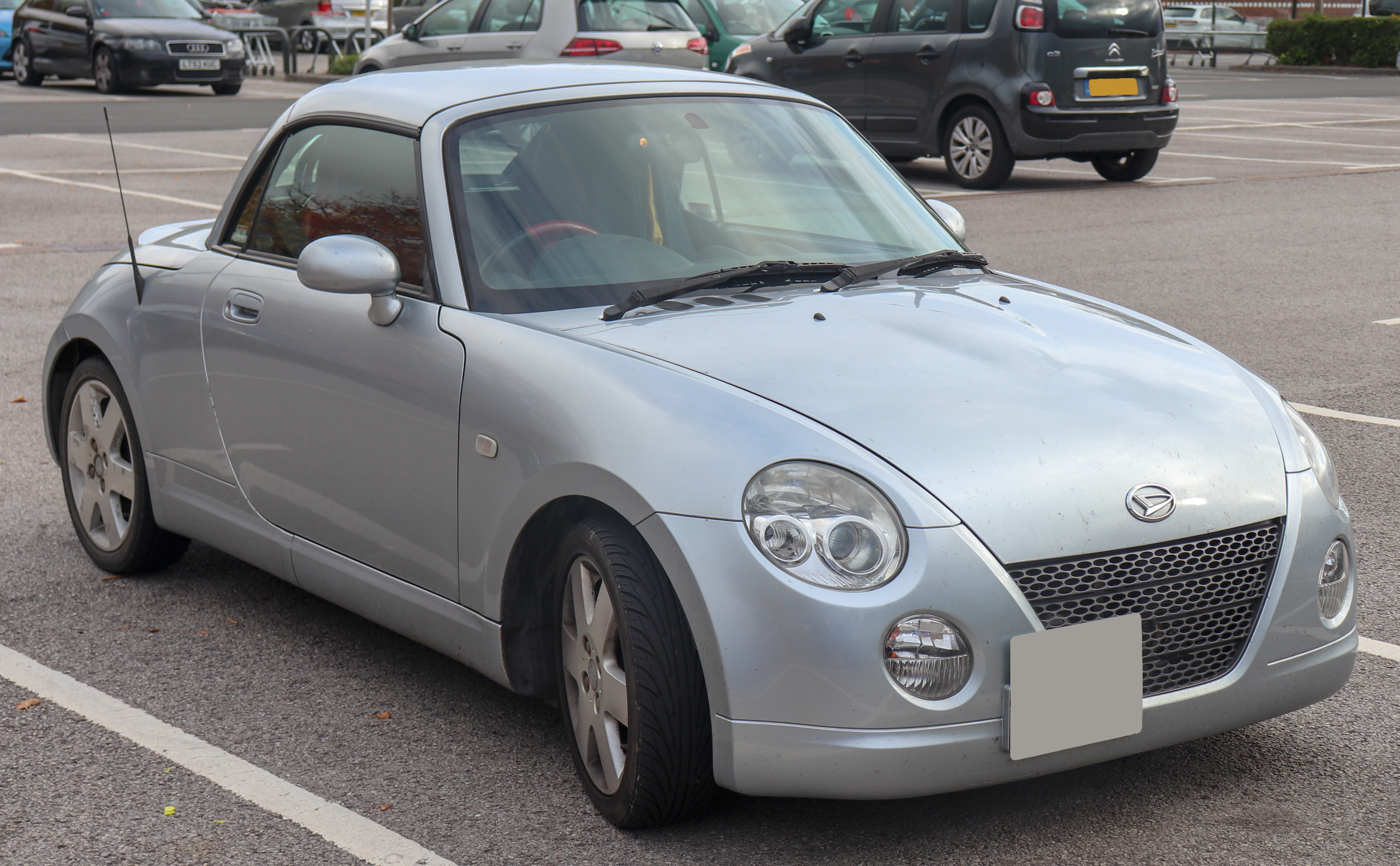
2007 Daihatsu Copen in the UK

European imports began in 1979. The company had little or no presence in countries with protectionist barriers, such as France and Spain—where local manufacturers also targeted the same market segment as Daihatsu. Daihatsu sold mainly in the United Kingdom, Germany, and the Netherlands. In Italy, Daihatsu partnered with local small car experts Innocenti in 1982 as a backdoor to several continental markets. The Italian manufacturer used Daihatsu drivetrains in their cars from 1983 until 1993.

Beginning in 1992, Piaggio manufactured the Hijet microvan and truck locally, as the Piaggio Porter, Innocenti Porter, or Daihatsu Hijet. It remains available as of 2020 and is also built in India. In the mid-1980s, Daihatsu also briefly imported Charade assembled by Alfa Romeo's South African subsidiary to Italy, in another effort to circumvent import restrictions.

Daihatsu announced on January 13, 2011, that sales of Daihatsu motor cars would cease across Europe on January 31, 2013. This was due to the increasing strength of the Japanese yen, which had increased prices beyond competitive levels. Daihatsu had no stock of new Daihatsu cars in the UK at the time and did not intend to import any more cars in the interim period.

=== Africa ===
From 1983 until 1985, Alfa Romeo's South African branch assembled the Charade for local sales and for export to Italy. In April 2015, the company pulled out of South Africa.

== Electrics and hybrids ==
Daihatsu has had a long-running development program for electric vehicles, beginning with the production of "pavilion cars" for the 1970 Osaka World Expo and continuing with the production of golf carts and vehicles for institutional use, such as the DBC-1. An electric version of the company's Fellow Max kei car also followed, the beginning of a series of prototypes. The 1973 oil crisis provided further impetus and at the 20th Tokyo Motor Show (1973) Daihatsu displayed a 550 W electric trike (TR-503E), the BCX-III electric car prototype and daihatsu's own EV1.

Daihatsu showed more prototypes through the 1970s, for instance at the 1979 Sydney Motor Show, and then joined the Japanese Electric Vehicle Association's PREET program (Public Rent and Electronic Towncar) with an electric version of the Max Cuore kei car. The program allowed registered users access to the cars with a magnetized card and charged according to mileage used.

In November 1974, Daihatsu released the Hallo (ES38V), a tilting trike powered by an electric motor and two 12V batteries.

In December 2011, Daihatsu released the Pico EV Concept, a quadricycle powered by an electric motor.

The company released a mild hybrid technology called the Daihatsu Mild Hybrid System in 2007, and is used in the Hijet/Atrai Hybrid-IV.

In November 2021, Daihatsu released their first mass-produced full hybrid system. Marketed as the "e-Smart Hybrid", it is a series hybrid system as opposed to Toyota's more advanced parallel hybrid technology. The technology was first used by the hybrid version of the A200 series Rocky. It is also used by the Toyota-branded model, the Raize under the common "Hybrid Synergy Drive" branding.

== Motorcycles ==
Daihatsu Hallo

In 1973, Daihatsu presented an electric tilting trike at the Tokyo Motor Show. This entered production in 1975 as the Hallo. Daihatsu also released a petrol powered version using a 50 cc two-stroke engine.

== Logo ==
Daihatsu is well known with its signature stylized D logo. It debuted in September 1963 on the Compagno as the first automobile with the Daihatsu D logo. From its establishment in 1951 until 1969, Daihatsu also used a Ford-like logo, with Daihatsu vintage-style cursive wordmark (outside Japan) and Daihatsu wordmark in katakana, written inside an ellipse. Daihatsu had a secondary logo, based on a stylized drawing of Osaka Castle, as installed on its three-wheeler trucks during the 1950s to 1960s. The script logo remained in use as Daihatsu's corporate logo and appeared on Daihatsu product catalogues and brochures until November 1969. Hence in the 1950s and 1960s Daihatsu was commonly referred to as Japan's Ford, and as the Japanese equivalent to Ford. In December 1969, this logo was discontinued and Daihatsu officially used the D logo as its corporate logo. Except in Indonesia, the first Daihatsu logo was used in brochures until about 1977 or 1978.

The famous D logo is a stylized, modernized version of the D in the earlier logo and resembles the da in katakana, as well as rocket shape and right arrow, representing Daihatsu's spirit to keep moving forward and growing for excellence. The stylized D is also an initialism for Daihatsu. Beginning in January 1970, the Daihatsu wordmark was written in Eurostile font and placed below the D logo.

The D logo as the corporate logo, the white D placed inside the red rectangle, has been used from late 1969 onwards. The first version of the D logo, surrounded with circle, was used on Daihatsu automobiles from 1963 until 1979. From 1979 to 1989, the D logo was surrounded by a dark grey rectangle. In November 1989, following the launch of Toyota's famous current logo, the D logo was surrounded by an oval, and made in chrome. The chrome D logo is used today, with several revisions, the most recent is a bolder and bigger chrome D logo introduced in 2004.

=== Daihatsu Slogans ===
- ワールドミニで未来を創る! (English: Creating The Future With Mini World, 1987-1998)
- それ、ダイハツがやります（English: Daihatsu Will Do It, 1996-1998）
- We Do Compact (1996-1998)
- テーマは、品質。 (English: The Theme Is Quality)
- We Make It Compact (Indonesia Only, 1998-2007)
- ひとりひとりを楽しくする品質。Goodが、ギュッと。 (English: Quality That Bring Joy For Everyone, Packed With Goodness, 2000-2003)
- ワンダフルスモール (English: Wonderful Small, 2003-2007)
- Innovation For Tomorrow (2007-2011, also used the slogan in Indonesia until 2013)
- もっと軽にできること。(English: What More can be done with Kei Cars, 2011-2016)
- Daihatsu Sahabatku (English: Daihatsu Is My Friend, 2013-present, Indonesia Only)
- 軽の技術で、コンパクトを変えていく。 (English: Transforming The Compact Car with Technology, 2016-2017)
- Light You Up〜らしく、ともに軽やかに〜 (English: Light You Up, Trust To Yourself Moving Up Together, 2017-2025)
- わたしにダイハツメイ。(English: DAIHATSUMEI for me. Invented for you, 2025-present)

== Mascot ==
The mascot for Daihatsu Motors is Kakukaku Shikajika (カクカクシカジカ), an anthropomorphic deer character. Created by illustrator Chiharu Sakazaki (who also designed the former mascot for the Suica smart card system), he wears a white shirt as well as black pants, and is drawn in a lineless artstyle. According to a Daihatsu representative, he has a "cool and slightly cynical" personality.

He has appeared in plenty of animated commercials for the company, as well as various merchandise and promo items primarily in Japan. Originally used to advertise the Daihatsu Move Conte (including his own special edition of the vehicle), he's been used on and off in marketing materials since 2008. Although the Move Conte ceased production in March 2017, the existing Kakushika remains a character representing Daihatsu's official mascot.

He has also appeared in commercials aired during New Year's Day discussing the company's sales. In 2018, they had the most commercials running for a single company within the first three days of the year on Japanese TV. Due to the 2023 emissions scandal, this was temporarily halted which led to disappointment from television viewers in the country. Kakukaku also has a cult following in the furry community, affectionately called the Kakukult, who has drawn fanart of the character. His official website states that he is the father of a family of four, with one son and one daughter. All families were revealed in later-2021 and used the last Shikajika name. The names of his family members are as follows:

- Mother - Tekipaki shikajika (テキパキシカジカ)
- Brother - Wakuwaku Shikajika（ワクワク屋さん）
- Sister - Kirakira Shikajika (キラキラシカジカ)

There is also a lesser known mascot named Tufton, a blue bird character designed to advertise the Daihatsu Taft line.

== Plants and production ==
=== Japan ===
Daihatsu's first, and oldest factory, called Ikeda Plant 1 was built in May 1939 in Ikeda, Osaka. The second factory was built May 1961 and is called Ikeda Plant 2. It houses the Osaka HQ office that was established March 1965. The company maintains an office in Tokyo, that was originally opened as Hatsudoki Seizo Co. Ltd. in June 1933 the Daihatsu Building.

Daihatsu currently has two factories in Ryūō, Shiga. The first factory was opened in April 1974, and the second one in January 1989. Daihatsu opened a factory in April 1973 in Ōyamazaki, Kyoto. Daihatsu opened two factories in Nakatsu, Ōita starting in November 2004 with Nakatsu Plant 1, followed by Nakatsu Plant 2 in November 2007. The Kurume Plant was opened in August 2008 in Kurume. It houses the Daihatsu Group Kyushu Development Center which opened in 2014.

As of December 2025, the following vehicles are built by Daihatsu in Japan:

Daihatsu	Mazda	Subaru	Toyota	Body style	Kei	Plant
Atrai		Sambar Dias		MPV	Yes	Nakatsu 1
Copen				Roadster	Yes	Ikeda 2
Hijet Cargo		Sambar Van	Pixis Van	Van	Yes	Nakatsu 1
Hijet Truck		Sambar Truck	Pixis Truck	Truck	Yes	Nakatsu 1
Mira e:S		Pleo Plus	Pixis Epoch	Hatchback	Yes	Nakatsu 2
Move		Stella		MPV	Yes	Nakatsu 2
Move Canbus				MPV	Yes	Kyoto, Ryūō 2
Rocky		Rex	Raize	Crossover	No	Ryūō 2
Taft				Crossover	Yes	Nakatsu 2
Tanto		Chiffon		MPV	Yes	Ryūō 2
Thor		Justy	Roomy	MPV	No	Ikeda 2
	Familia Van		Probox	Station wagon	No	Kyoto 2

=== Overseas ===
Daihatsu	Perodua	Mazda	Toyota	Body style	Plant
Ayla	Axia		Agya/Wigo	Hatchback	Karawang (ADM)
Ayla	Axia		Agya/Wigo	Hatchback	Serendah (PGMSB)
	Bezza			Sedan	Serendah (PGMSB)
Gran Max		Bongo	TownAce/LiteAce	Van/truck	Sunter (ADM)
Luxio				MPV	Sunter (ADM)
Rocky	Ativa		Raize	Crossover	Karawang (ADM)
Rocky	Ativa		Raize	Crossover	Rawang (PMSB)
Sigra			Calya	MPV	Karawang (ADM, TMMIN)
Sirion	Myvi			Hatchback	Rawang (PMSB)
Terios	Aruz		Rush	SUV	Karawang (ADM)
Terios	Aruz		Rush	SUV	Rawang (PMSB)
Xenia	Alza		Avanza/Veloz	MPV/SUV	Karawang (ADM, TMMIN)
Xenia	Alza		Avanza/Veloz	MPV/SUV	Rawang (PMSB)
	Traz		Yaris Cross (AC200)	SUV	Karawang (TMMIN)
	Traz		Yaris Cross (AC200)	SUV	Rawang (PMSB)
