= Daihatsu K-series engine =

Car engine families

The Daihatsu K-series is a series of three unrelated engine families (KF, KR and K3/KJ), even though named with same initial "K" letter code. These engines were built in DOHC 12-valve inline three (KF & KR) and DOHC 16-valve inline four (K3/KJ) engine layout, ranging from 0.66 L, 1.0 L and up to 1.3 L. All engine families are available in naturally aspirated and turbocharged form. The new KF weighs 47kg (103lbs) which is 25% less than the old EF which weighs 59kg (130lbs)

== KF ==
Introduced in November 2005, Daihatsu KF engine is a series of 658 cc inline-three cylinder DOHC 12 valve water-cooled engine, designed for kei cars. This engine replacing the old EF series engine.

Type	Displacement	Bore x Stroke	Bore Pitch	Cylinders	Compression	Power	Torque	Application
KF-DE	658 cc	63 x 70.4 mm	78 mm	3	11.5	50 PS (49 hp; 37 kW) at 6,900 rpm	60 N⋅m (6.1 kg⋅m; 44 lbf⋅ft) at 3,600 rpm	Not available
KF-VE (with DVVT)	658 cc	63 x 70.4 mm	78 mm	3	11.5	50 PS (49 hp; 37 kW) at 5,700 rpm	64 N⋅m (6.5 kg⋅m; 47 lbf⋅ft) at 4,000 rpm	S200 Daihatsu Hijet Truck/Toyota Pixis Truck/Subaru Sambar; S320 Daihatsu Hijet Cargo/Toyota Pixis Van/Subaru Sambar Van
KF-VE (with DVVT)	658 cc	63 x 70.4 mm	78 mm	3	11.5	53 PS (52 hp; 39 kW) at 7,000 rpm	64 N⋅m (6.5 kg⋅m; 47 lbf⋅ft) at 4,000 rpm	S200 Daihatsu Hijet Truck/Toyota Pixis Truck/Subaru Sambar; S320 Daihatsu Hijet Cargo/Toyota Pixis Van
KF-VE (with DVVT)	658 cc	63 x 70.4 mm	78 mm	3	11.5	58 PS (57 hp; 43 kW) at 7,200 rpm	65 N⋅m (6.6 kg⋅m; 48 lbf⋅ft) at 4,000 rpm	L175 Daihatsu Move; L255 Daihatsu Esse; L275 Daihatsu Mira/Subaru Pleo; L375 Daihatsu Tanto; L455 Daihatsu Tanto Exe/Subaru Lucra; L575 Daihatsu Move Conte
KF-VE (with DVVT)	658 cc	63 x 70.4 mm	78 mm	3	11.5	52 PS (51 hp; 38 kW) at 7,200 rpm	60 N⋅m (6.1 kg⋅m; 44 lbf⋅ft) at 4,000 rpm	L275 Subaru Pleo; LA100 Daihatsu Move/Subaru Stella; LA250 Daihatsu Cast/Toyota Pixis Joy; LA700 Daihatsu Wake/Daihatsu Hijet Caddie/Toyota Pixis Mega; L575 Daihatsu Move Conte/Toyota Pixis Space
KF-VE (with DVVT)	658 cc	63 x 70.4 mm	78 mm	3	11.3	52 PS (51 hp; 38 kW) at 6,800 rpm	60 N⋅m (6.1 kg⋅m; 44 lbf⋅ft) at 5,200 rpm	LA300 Daihatsu Mira e:S/Toyota Pixis Epoch/Subaru Pleo Plus; LA550 Daihatsu Mira Tocot; LA600/650 Daihatsu Tanto/Subaru Chiffon; LA800 Daihatsu Move Canbus
KF-VE (with DVVT)	658 cc	63 x 70.4 mm	78 mm	3	11.3	46 PS (45 hp; 34 kW) at 5,700 rpm	60 N⋅m (6.1 kg⋅m; 44 lbf⋅ft) at 4,000 rpm	S320 Daihatsu Hijet Cargo/Toyota Pixis Van/Subaru Sambar Van; S500 Daihatsu Hijet Truck/Toyota Pixis Truck/Subaru Sambar Truck
KF-VE (with DVVT)	658 cc	63 x 70.4 mm	78 mm	3	11.3	53 PS (52 hp; 39 kW) at 7,200 rpm	60 N⋅m (6.1 kg⋅m; 44 lbf⋅ft) at 4,000 rpm	S320 Daihatsu Hijet Cargo/Toyota Pixis Van/Subaru Sambar Van; S500 Daihatsu Hijet Truck/Toyota Pixis Truck/Subaru Sambar Truck
KF-VE (with DVVT)	658 cc	63 x 70.4 mm	78 mm	3	12.2	49 PS (48 hp; 36 kW) at 6,800 rpm	57 N⋅m (5.8 kg⋅m; 42 lbf⋅ft) at 5,200 rpm	LA350 Daihatsu Mira e:S/Toyota Pixis Epoch/Subaru Pleo Plus
KF-VE (CNG with DVVT)	658 cc	63 x 70.4 mm	78 mm	3	12.8	45 PS (44 hp; 33 kW) at 7,200 rpm	64 N⋅m (6.5 kg⋅m; 47 lbf⋅ft) at 4,000 rpm	L275 Daihatsu Mira Van (Gas powered car)
KF-VE (CNG with DVVT)	658 cc	63 x 70.4 mm	78 mm	3	12.8	39 PS (38 hp; 29 kW) at 6,400 rpm	52 N⋅m (5.3 kg⋅m; 38 lbf⋅ft) at 4,000 rpm	S320 Daihatsu Hijet Cargo (Gas powered car)
KF-DET (turbocharged)	658 cc	63 x 70.4 mm	78 mm	3	9.0	64 PS (63 hp; 47 kW) at 6,000 rpm	103 N⋅m (10.5 kg⋅m; 76 lbf⋅ft) at 3,000 rpm	L175 Daihatsu Move (Custom R/R Limited/RS); L375 Daihatsu Tanto Custom RS; L405 Daihatsu Sonica; L575 Daihatsu Move Conte/Toyota Pixis Space Custom RS
KF-DET (turbocharged)	658 cc	63 x 70.4 mm	78 mm	3	9.0	64 PS (63 hp; 47 kW) at 5,700 rpm	103 N⋅m (10.5 kg⋅m; 76 lbf⋅ft) at 2,800 rpm	LA100 Daihatsu Move; L275 Daihatsu Mira/Subaru Pleo Custom RS; L455 Daihatsu Tanto Exe/Subaru Lucra Custom RS; S320 Daihatsu Atrai/Subaru Dias Wagon; S320 Hijet Cargo Cruise Turbo/Toyota Pixis Van Cruise Turbo/Subaru Sambar Van VC Turbo
KF-DET (turbocharged)	658 cc	63 x 70.4 mm	78 mm	3	9.0	64 PS (63 hp; 47 kW) at 6,400 rpm	95 N⋅m (9.7 kg⋅m; 70 lbf⋅ft) at 4,000 rpm	LA150 Daihatsu Move/Subaru Stella Custom RS; LA700 Daihatsu Hijet Caddie
KF-DET (turbocharged)	658 cc	63 x 70.4 mm	78 mm	3	9.0	64 PS (63 hp; 47 kW) at 6,400 rpm	95 N⋅m (9.7 kg⋅m; 70 lbf⋅ft) at 3,200 rpm	LA400 Daihatsu/Toyota Copen GR Sport; LA600/650 Daihatsu Tanto/Subaru Chiffon Custom RS
KF-VET (with DVVT)	658 cc	63 x 70.4 mm	78 mm	3	9.5	64 PS (63 hp; 47 kW) at 6,000 rpm	103 N⋅m (10.5 kg⋅m; 76 lbf⋅ft) at 3,000 rpm	LA250 Daihatsu Cast (G Turbo/Sport)/Toyota Pixis Joy (G Turbo/S); LA700 Daihatsu Wake/Toyota Pixis Mega X/G

== K3 ==
The Daihatsu K3 engine is a series of 1.3 L 4-cylinder DOHC 16-valve, water-cooled gasoline engine developed and produced by Daihatsu since April 2000, replacing Daihatsu HC engine. This engine also known as Toyota 2SZ-FE engine. The stroked up version of this engine is called 3SZ-VE engine (1.5 L) and stroked down version is called KJ-VET engine (1.0 L).

Type	Displacement	Bore x Stroke	Bore Pitch	Cylinders	Compression	Power	Torque	Application
K3-DE (without DVVT)	1297 cc	72 x 79.7 mm	78 mm	4	10.0	88 PS (87 hp; 65 kW) at 6,000 rpm	114 N⋅m (11.6 kg⋅m; 84 lbf⋅ft) at 3,600 rpm	F600/650 Daihatsu Xenia/Toyota Avanza (2003–2006); S400 Daihatsu Gran Max
K3-VE (with DVVT)	1297 cc	72 x 79.7 mm	78 mm	4	10.0	90 PS (89 hp; 66 kW) at 6,000 rpm	123 N⋅m (12.5 kg⋅m; 91 lbf⋅ft) at 4,400 rpm	J100 Daihatsu Terios/Toyota Cami/Perodua Kembara (Malaysia); L881 Daihatsu Copen (Europe); M100 Daihatsu Storia/Daihatsu Sirion/Toyota Duet; M200 Daihatsu YRV
K3-VE (with DVVT)	1297 cc	72 x 79.7 mm	78 mm	4	10.0	92 PS (91 hp; 68 kW) at 6,000 rpm	119 N⋅m (12.1 kg⋅m; 88 lbf⋅ft) at 4,400 rpm	F600/650 Daihatsu Xenia/Toyota Avanza (2004–2015); J200 Daihatsu Terios/Toyota Rush; M300 Daihatsu Boon/Daihatsu Sirion/Toyota Passo; M400 Daihatsu Coo/Daihatsu Materia/Toyota bB/Subaru Dex; S220 Daihatsu Atrai 7/Toyota Sparky/Daihatsu Hijet Gran Cargo
K3-VE2 (high revving version)	1297 cc	72 x 79.7 mm	78 mm	4	11.0	110 PS (110 hp; 81 kW) at 7,000 rpm	126 N⋅m (12.8 kg⋅m; 93 lbf⋅ft) at 4,400 rpm	M100 Daihatsu Storia/Toyota Duet Rally
K3-VE2 (high revving version)	1297 cc	72 x 79.7 mm	78 mm	4	11.0	102 PS (101 hp; 75 kW) at 7,000 rpm	120 N⋅m (12 kg⋅m; 89 lbf⋅ft) at 4,400 rpm	M100 Daihatsu Sirion GTvi (Australia)
K3-VET (turbocharged version)	1297 cc	72 x 79.7 mm	78 mm	4	8.5	140 PS (140 hp; 100 kW) at 6,300 rpm	177 N⋅m (18.0 kg⋅m; 131 lbf⋅ft) at 3,200 rpm	J100 Daihatsu Terios/Toyota Cami Turbo Aero; M300 Daihatsu YRV Turbo 130

== KJ ==
The Daihatsu KJ-VET engine is a turbocharged 1.0 L 4-cylinder DOHC 16-valve, water-cooled gasoline engine developed and produced by Daihatsu. This short lived engine only available for Daihatsu Boon X4. This engine is a stroked down version of K3-VET engine.

Type	Displacement	Bore x Stroke	Bore Pitch	Cylinders	Compression	Power	Torque	Application
KJ-VET	939 cc	72 x 57.5 mm	78 mm	4	8.3	133 PS (131 hp; 98 kW) at 7,200 rpm	132 N⋅m (13.5 kg⋅m; 97 lbf⋅ft) at 3,600 rpm	M300 Daihatsu Boon X4

== KR ==
A 1.0 L inline 3-cylinder engine series designed and produced by Daihatsu.
