= Daihatsu Wake =

Kei car model from Daihatsu

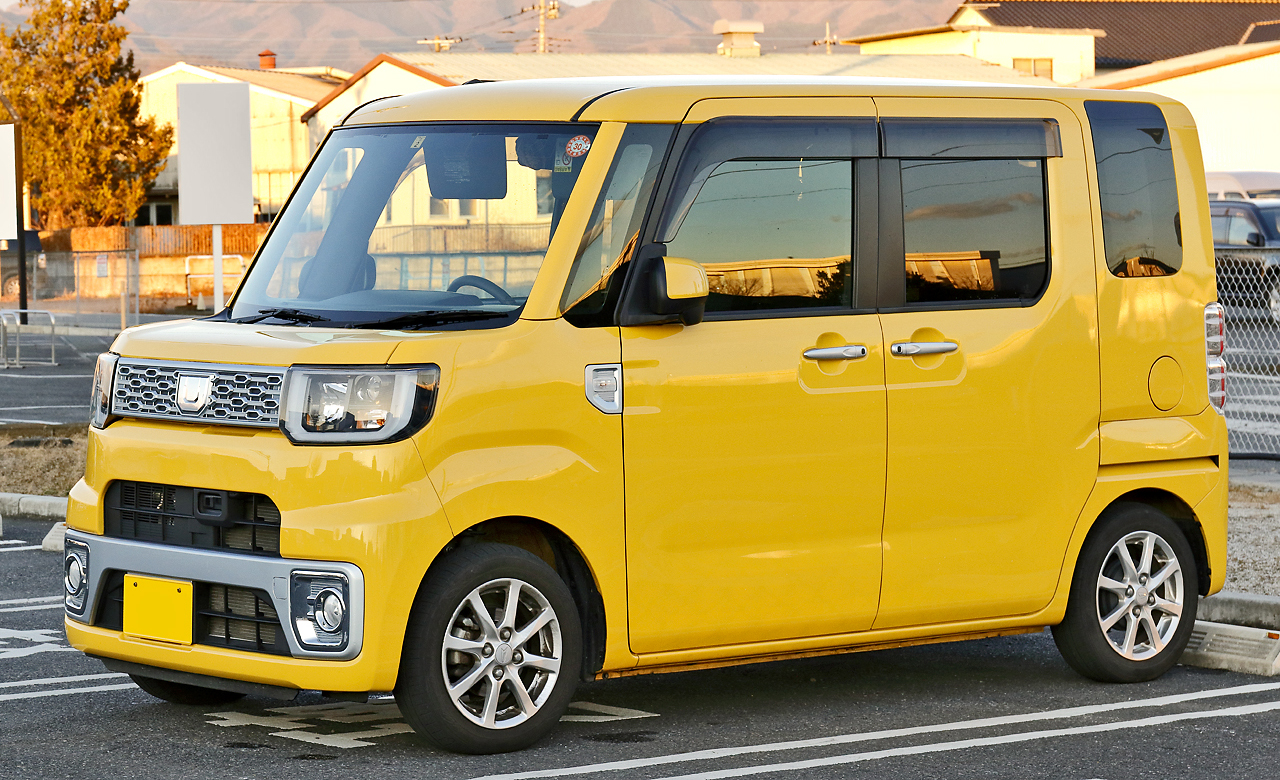
- 2014–2016 Daihatsu Wake X SA (LA700S)

Overview
- Manufacturer: Daihatsu
- Model code: LA700
- Also called: Toyota Pixis Mega; Daihatsu Hijet Caddie (van)
- Production: November 2014 – August 2022 (Wake); July 2015 – August 2022 (Pixis Mega); June 2016 – February 2021 (Hijet Caddie)
- Assembly: Japan: Nakatsu, Ōita (Daihatsu Motor Kyushu)

Body and chassis
- Class: Kei car (Wake/Pixis Mega); Microvan (Hijet Caddie)
- Body style: 5-door minivan; 5-door van (Hijet Caddie)
- Layout: Front-engine, front-wheel-drive; Front-engine, four-wheel-drive

Powertrain
- Engine: Petrol: 658 cc KF-VE I3; 658 cc KF-DET turbo I3
- Power output: 38 kW (51 hp; 52 PS) (KF-VE); 47 kW (63 hp; 64 PS) (KF-DET)
- Transmission: CVT

Dimensions
- Wheelbase: 2,455 mm (96.7 in)
- Length: 3,395 mm (133.7 in)
- Width: 1,475 mm (58.1 in)
- Height: 1,835 mm (72.2 in)
- Kerb weight: 990–1,060 kg (2,183–2,337 lb)

Chronology
- Predecessor: Daihatsu Mira Van (Hijet Caddie)
- Successor: Daihatsu Tanto (LA650) (Wake, indirect); Daihatsu Atrai (S700) (Wake, indirect); Daihatsu Hijet Cargo (S700) (Hijet Caddie)

The Daihatsu Wake (Japanese: ダイハツ・ウェイク, Hepburn: Daihatsu Weiku) is a kei car with sliding doors sold by Daihatsu between November 2014 and August 2022. The vehicle was previewed by Deca Deca concept cars that were shown at 2009 and 2013 Tokyo Motor Shows.

The microvan version of the Wake, intended for commercial use, was called the Hijet Caddie (ダイハツ・ハイゼットキャディー, Daihatsu Haizetto Kyadī) and was available between 2016 and 2021. The Wake was also sold by Toyota as the Toyota Pixis Mega (Japanese: トヨタ・ピクシスメガ, Hepburn: Toyota Pikushisu Mega) between 2015 and 2022.

The Wake had an interior cabin height of 1,455 mm (57.3 in), which was the highest in kei car segment. The Hijet Caddie had a permitted maximum loading capacity of 150 kg (330 lb).

== Gallery ==
=== Wake ===
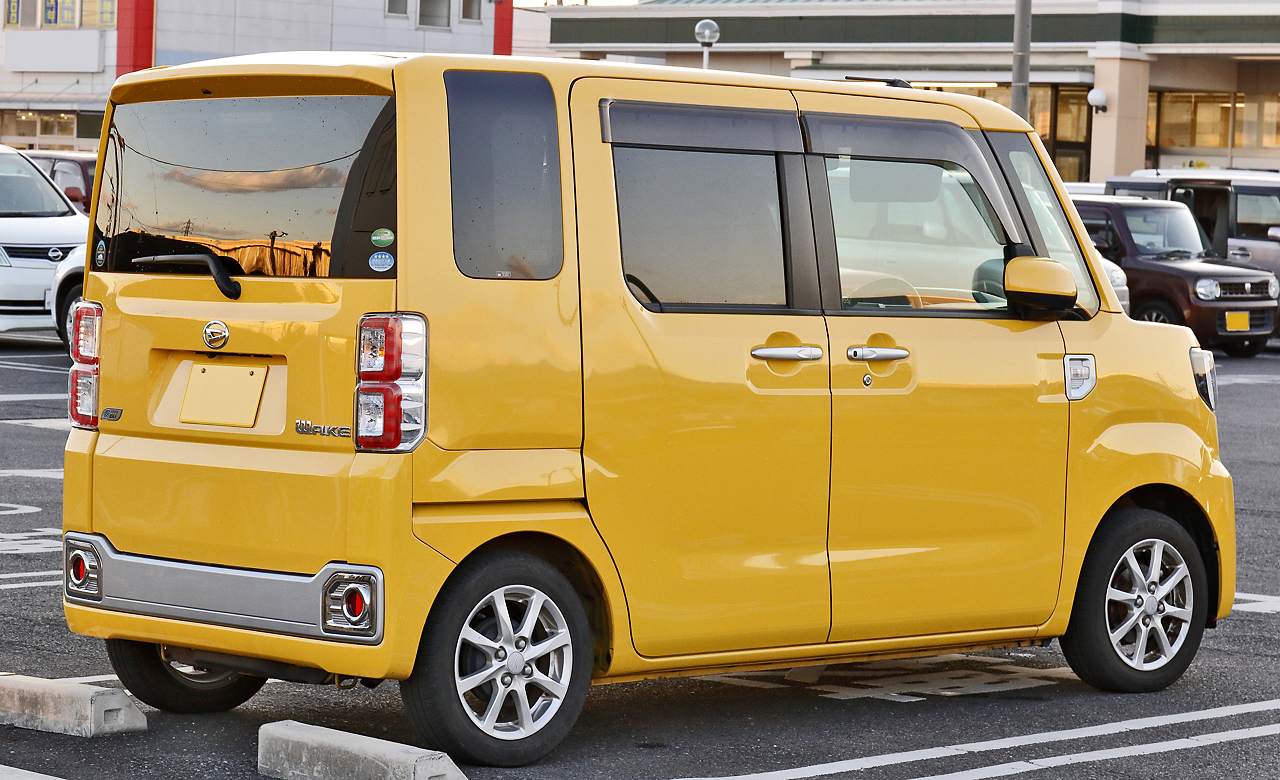
Rear view

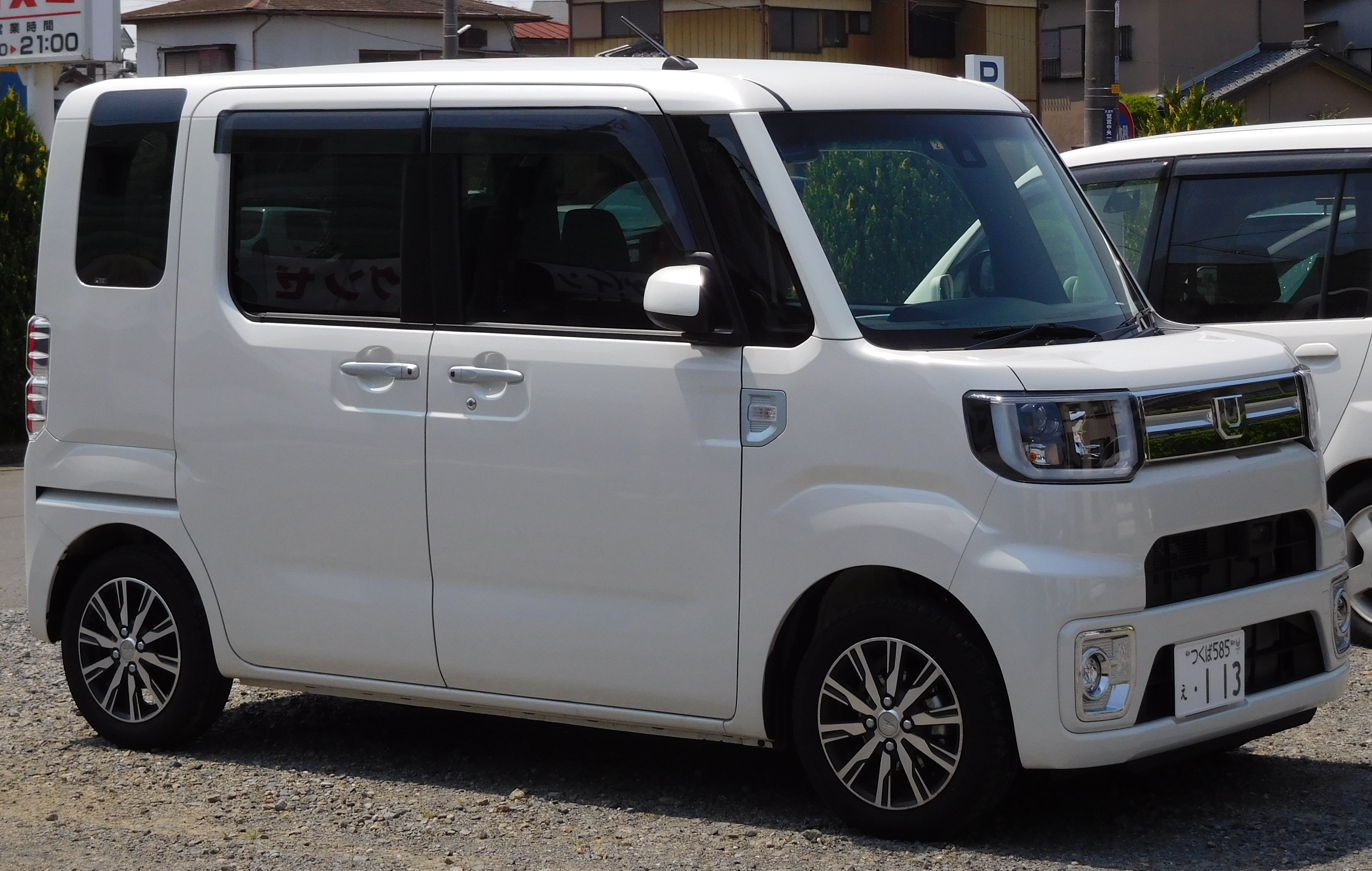
2017 Wake (LA700S)

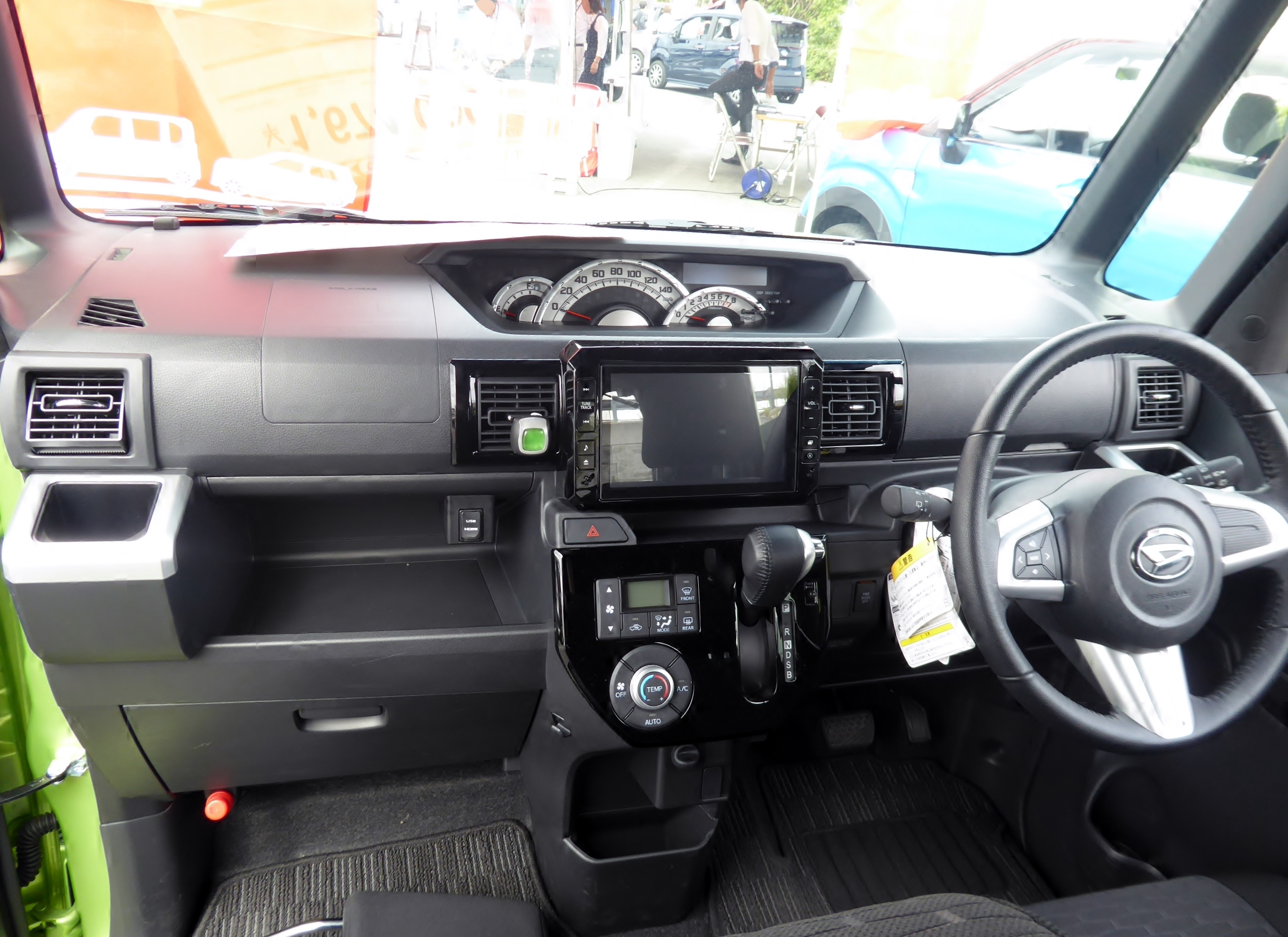
Interior

=== Pixis Mega ===
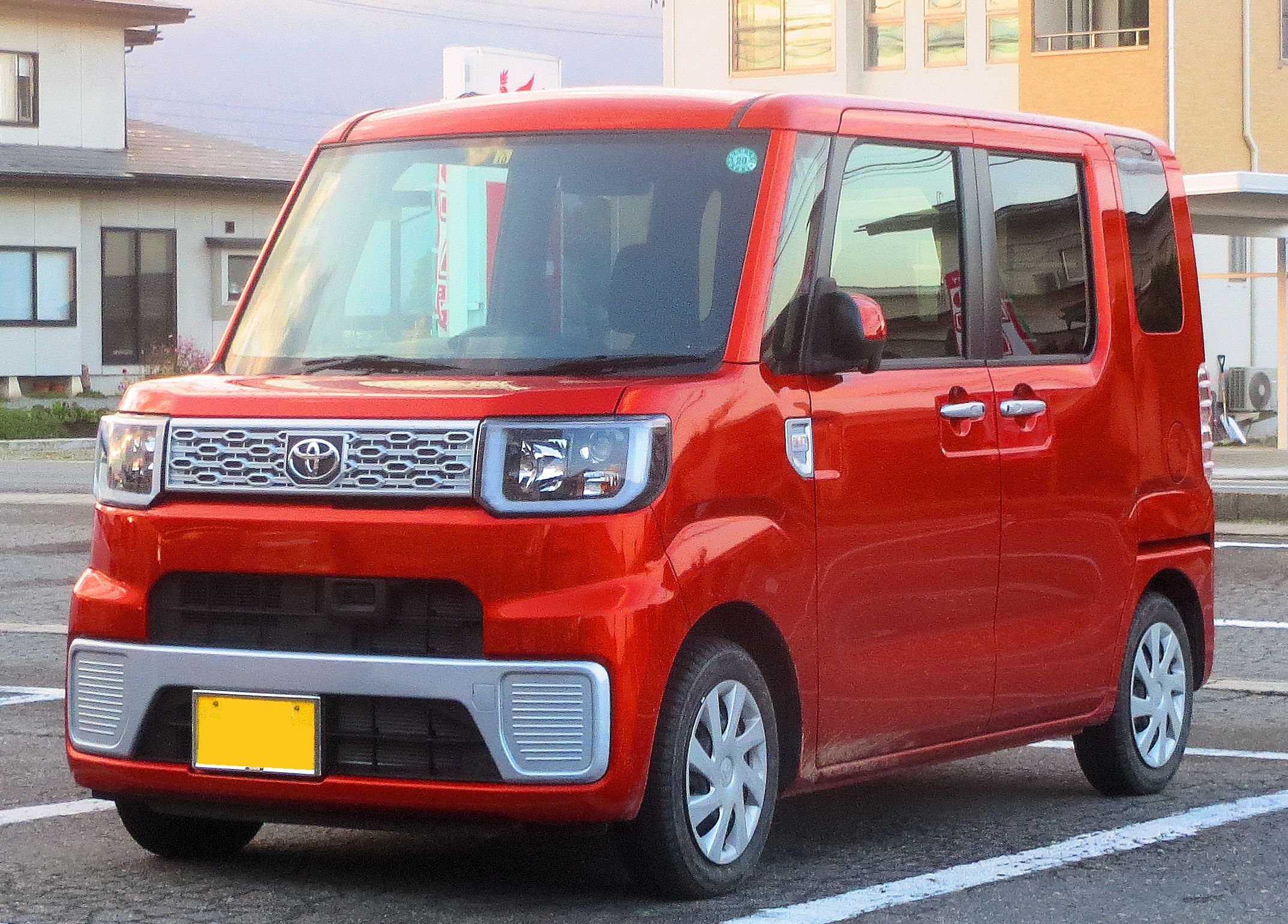
2015–2016 Toyota Pixis Mega L SA (LA700A)

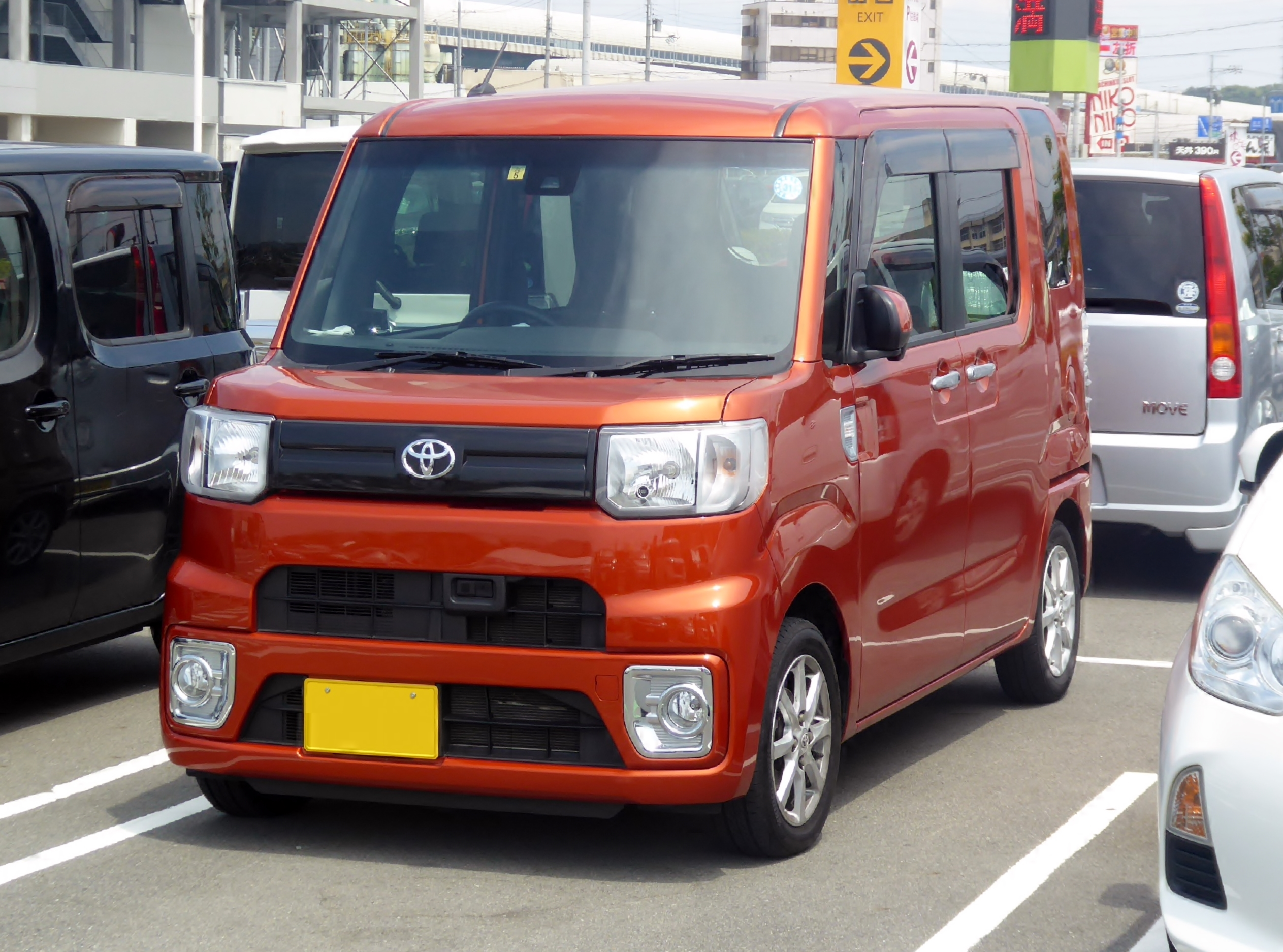
2018 Pixis Mega L SA III (LA700A)

=== Hijet Caddie ===
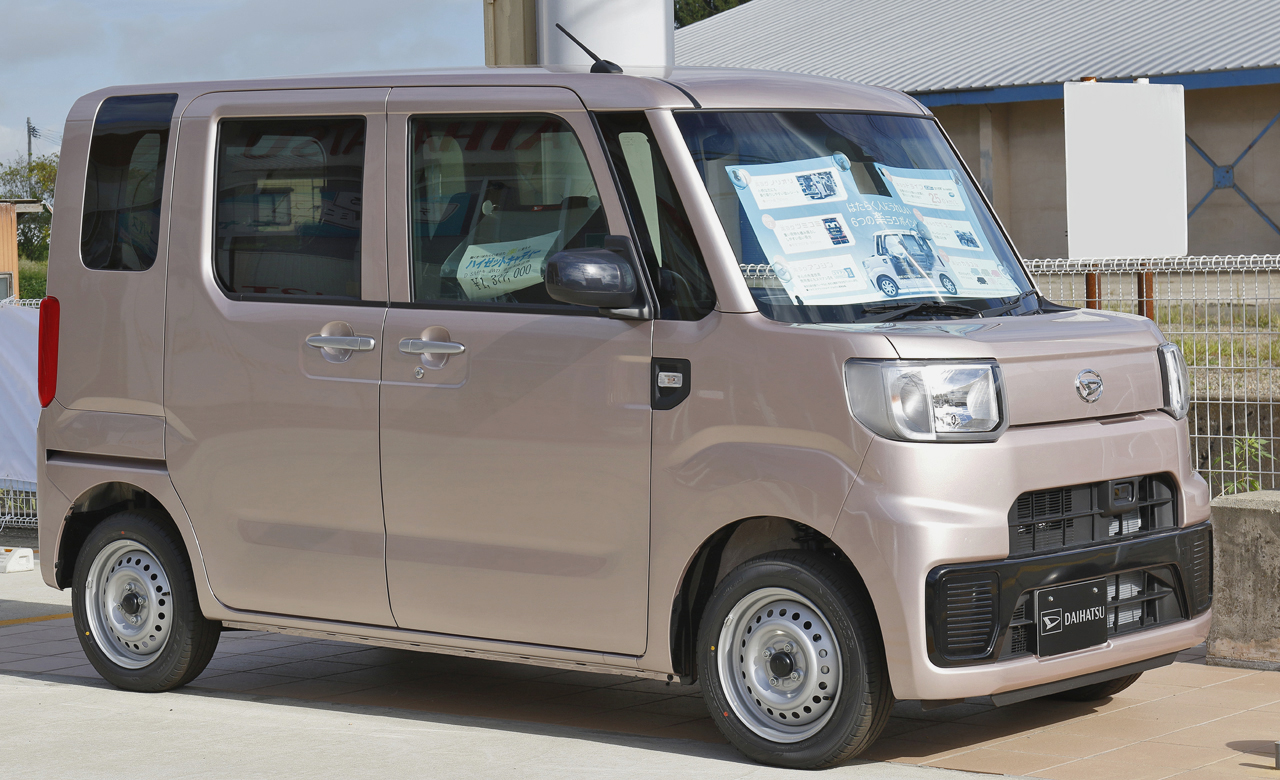
Hijet Caddie (LA700V)

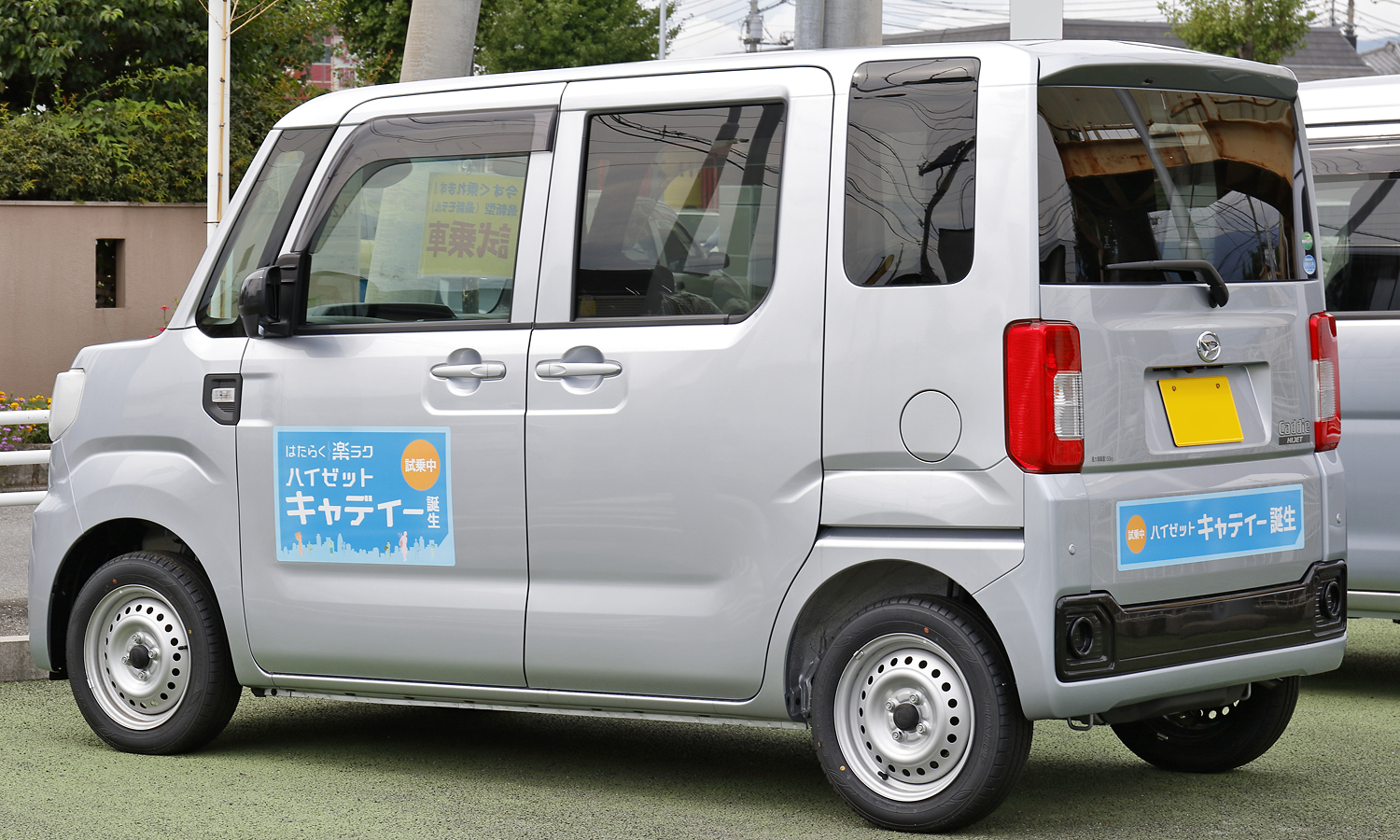
Hijet Caddie D SA II (LA700V)

=== Deca Deca ===
The Deca Deca concept cars, from 2009 and 2013, inspired the Wake's design.

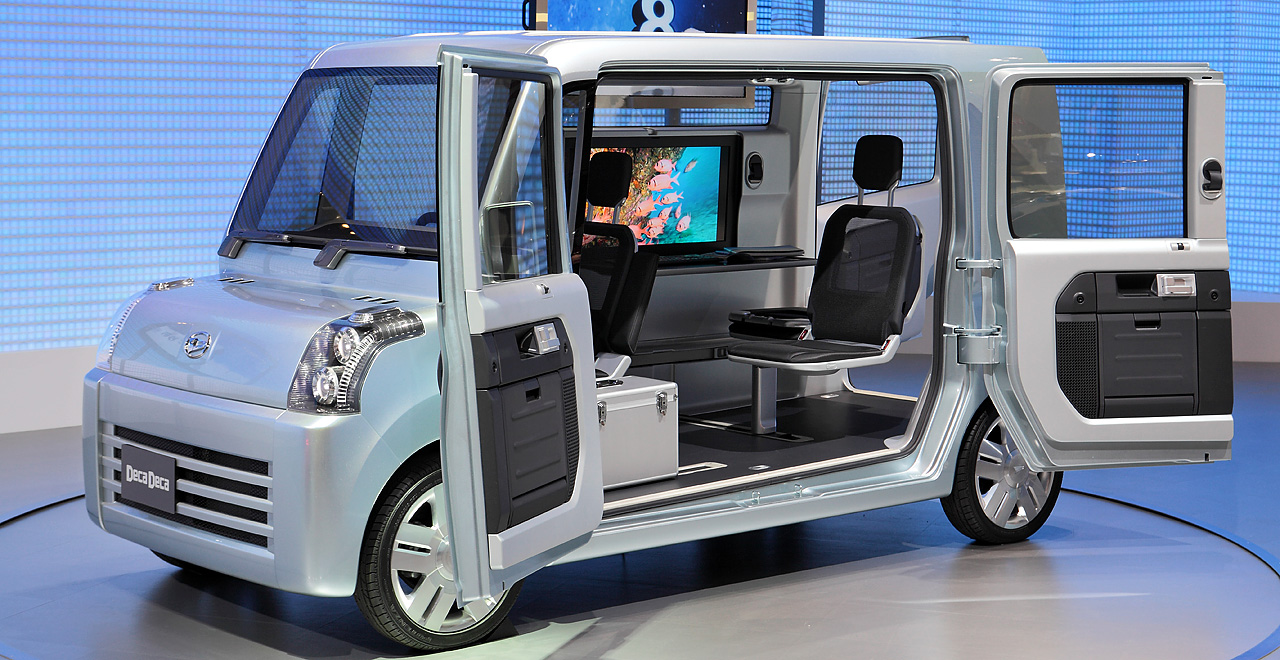
2009 Deca Deca

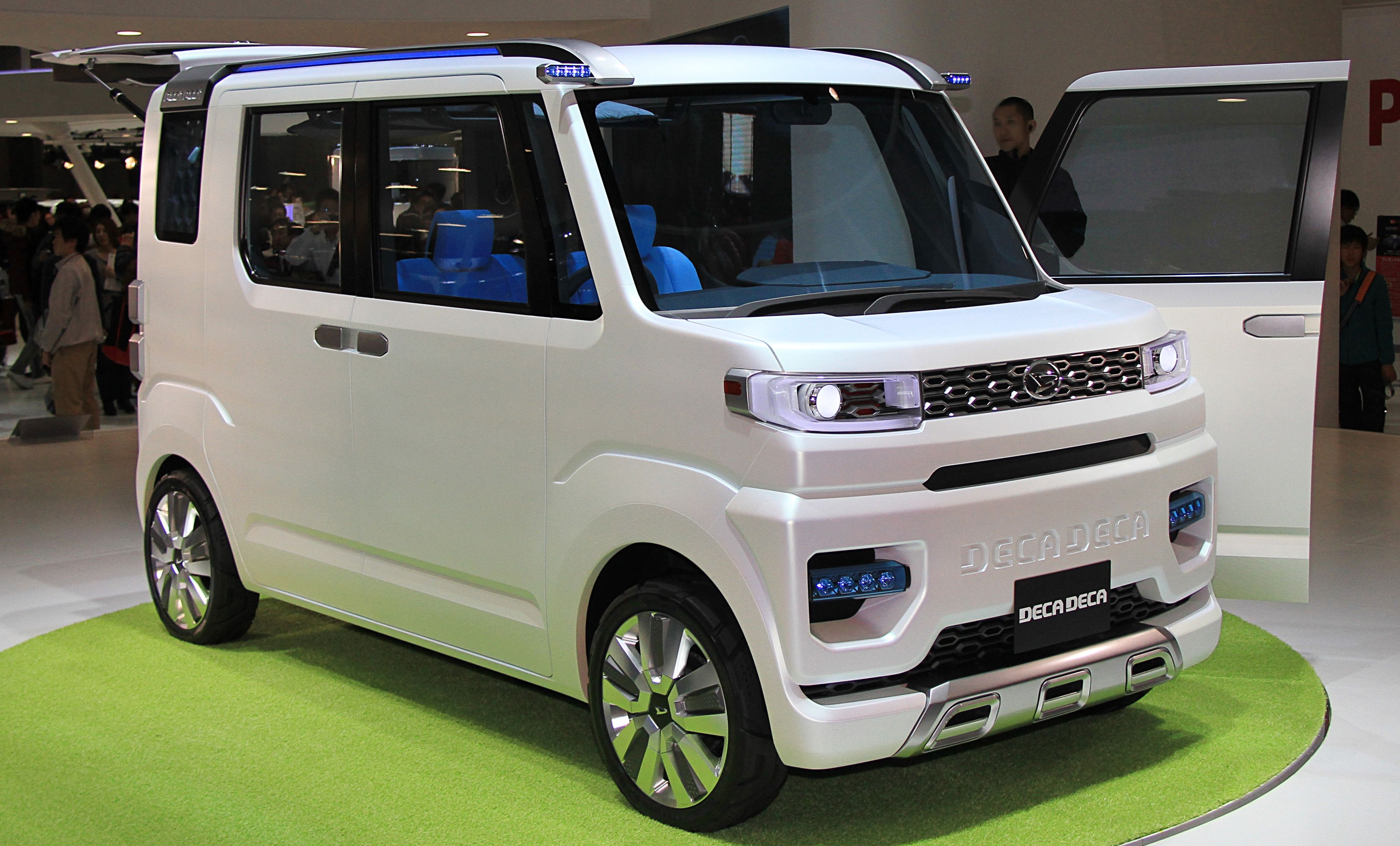
2013 Deca Deca

== Sales ==
Prior to its market release, Daihatsu set a monthly sales target for the Wake at 5,000 units. However, the Wake underperformed throughout its sale period, rarely reaching even half of that goal.

| Year | Japan |
|---|---|
| 2014 | 16,610 |
| 2015 | 50,711 |
| 2016 | 32,828 |
| 2017 | 28,466 |
| 2018 | 28,637 |
| 2019 | 22,382 |
| 2020 | 16,776 |
| 2021 | 14,929 |
| 2022 | 9,001 |
