= Daihatsu Move Conte =

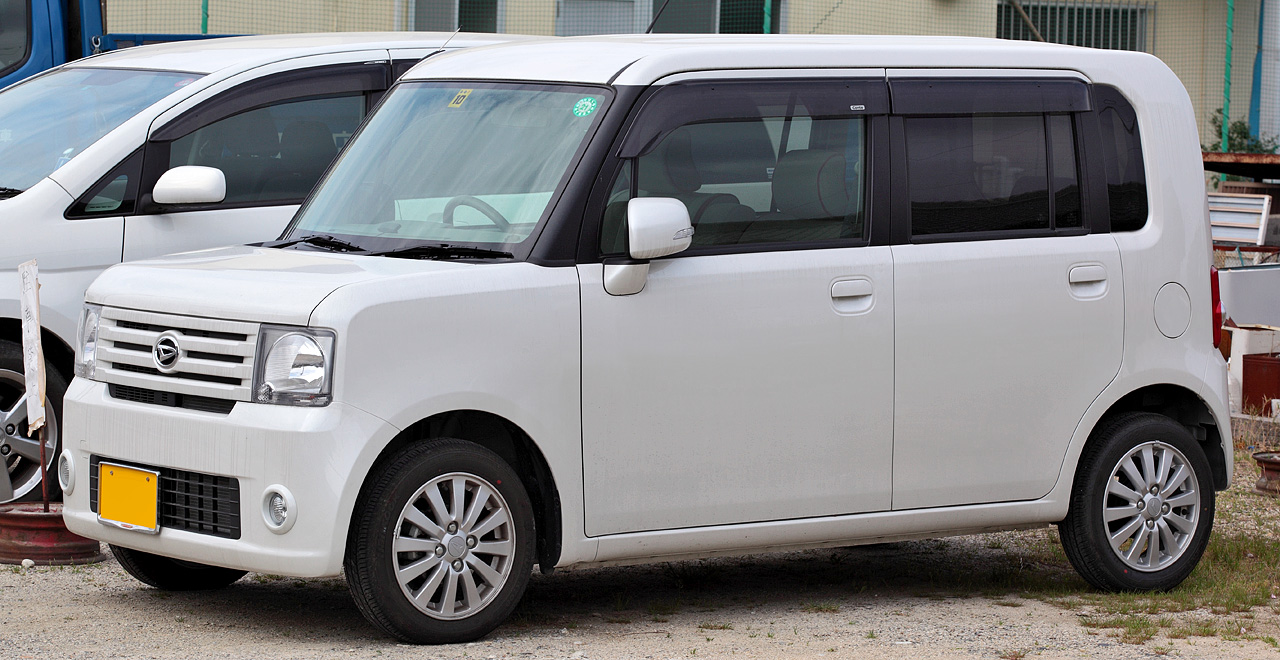

Overview
- Manufacturer: Daihatsu
- Model code: L575/L585
- Also called: Toyota Pixis Space
- Production: August 2008 – December 2016 (Move Conte); September 2011 – January 2017 (Pixis Space)
- Assembly: Japan: Nakatsu, Ōita (Daihatsu Motor Kyushu)
- Designer: Yuji Kitagawa and Shinichi Nakabayashi

Body and chassis
- Class: Kei car
- Body style: 5-door hatchback
- Layout: Front-engine, front-wheel-drive (L575); Front-engine, four-wheel-drive (L585)
- Related: Daihatsu Move (L175); Daihatsu Mira Cocoa

Powertrain
- Engine: Petrol: 658 cc KF-VE I3; 658 cc KF-DET turbo I3
- Power output: 52 PS (38 kW; 51 hp) (KF-VE); 64 PS (47 kW; 63 hp) (KF-DET)
- Transmission: 4-speed automatic; CVT

Dimensions
- Wheelbase: 2,490 mm (98.0 in)
- Length: 3,395 mm (133.7 in)
- Width: 1,475 mm (58.1 in)
- Height: 1,640–1,655 mm (64.6–65.2 in)
- Kerb weight: 820–930 kg (1,808–2,050 lb)

Chronology
- Predecessor: Daihatsu Move Latte
- Successor: Daihatsu Move Canbus; Toyota Pixis Joy (Pixis Space)

The Daihatsu Move Conte (Japanese: ダイハツ・ムーヴコンテ, Hepburn: Daihatsu Mūvu Konte) is a kei car built by the Japanese automaker Daihatsu from 2008 to 2016, sold until March 2017. It was a more angular cosmetic variation of the L175 series Move, which had moved away from the boxy look for its fourth generation. The name "Conte" is derived from "container", referring its boxy shape. The Move Conte was also available in the somewhat sportier looking Custom model, with headlights incorporating an overlapping, round element.

It had two engine options: a naturally-aspirated 658 cc KF-VE and a turbocharged 658 cc KF-DET three-cylinder petrol engines that produce 52 PS (38 kW) and 64 PS (47 kW) respectively. Four-wheel drive models added 50 kg (110 lb) to the overall weight, while the fuel tank was reduced from 36 to 34 L (9.5 to 9.0 US gal).

In December 2009, the lineup was revised and a few new equipment levels introduced. The new Move Conte Custom X Limited received chrome door handles, a leather covered steering wheel, upgraded speakers, and also included the "adjustable pack" which included a height adjustable driver's seat, tilt steering wheel, and adjustable shoulder belt. The regular Custom X was downgraded from aluminium wheels to steel wheels with hubcaps at the same time. In June 2011, the Move Conte received a light facelift including new grilles and some minor interior changes. The naturally aspirated engine was also updated to the next-generation KF engine, including the addition of Daihatsu's "Eco Idle" start-stop system. At the same time, the 4-speed automatic transmission which had been installed on the Move Conte L and L Limited was discontinued; the entire lineup used CVT transmissions from now on.

In September 2011, a Toyota-badged version of the Move Conte, the Toyota Pixis Space (Japanese: トヨタ・ピクシススペース, Hepburn: Toyota Pikushisu Supēsu), was launched. The Move Conte, along with the Pixis Space, were both discontinued in March 2017. The Move Canbus replaced the Move Conte, while the Pixis Space was later replaced by the Pixis Joy.

There also was a special edition version of the Move Conte with Daihatsu mascot Kakukaku Shikajika, who was used in advertising for the car at the time.

== Gallery ==
Move Conte

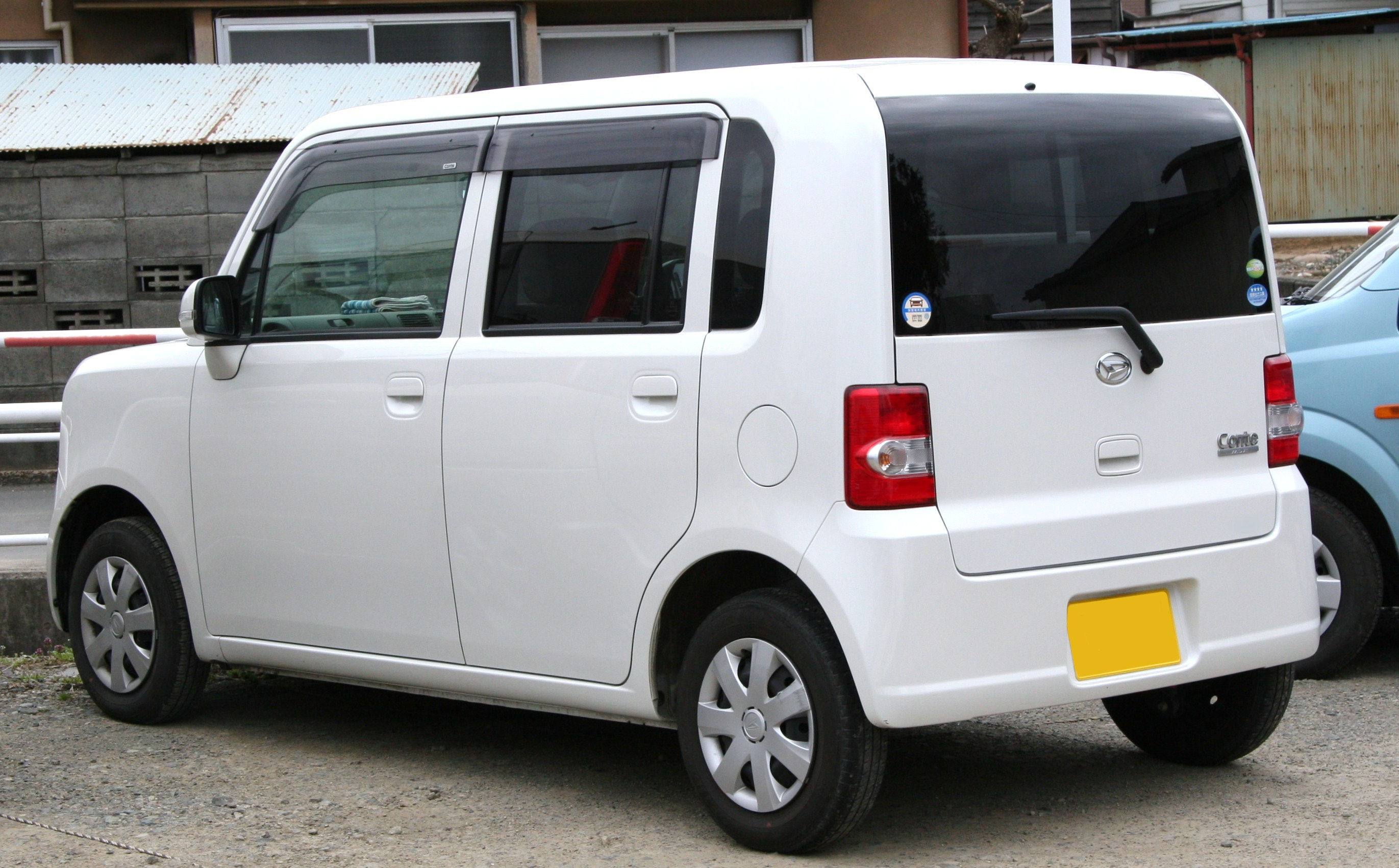
2008–2009 Daihatsu Move Conte (L575S; pre-facelift)

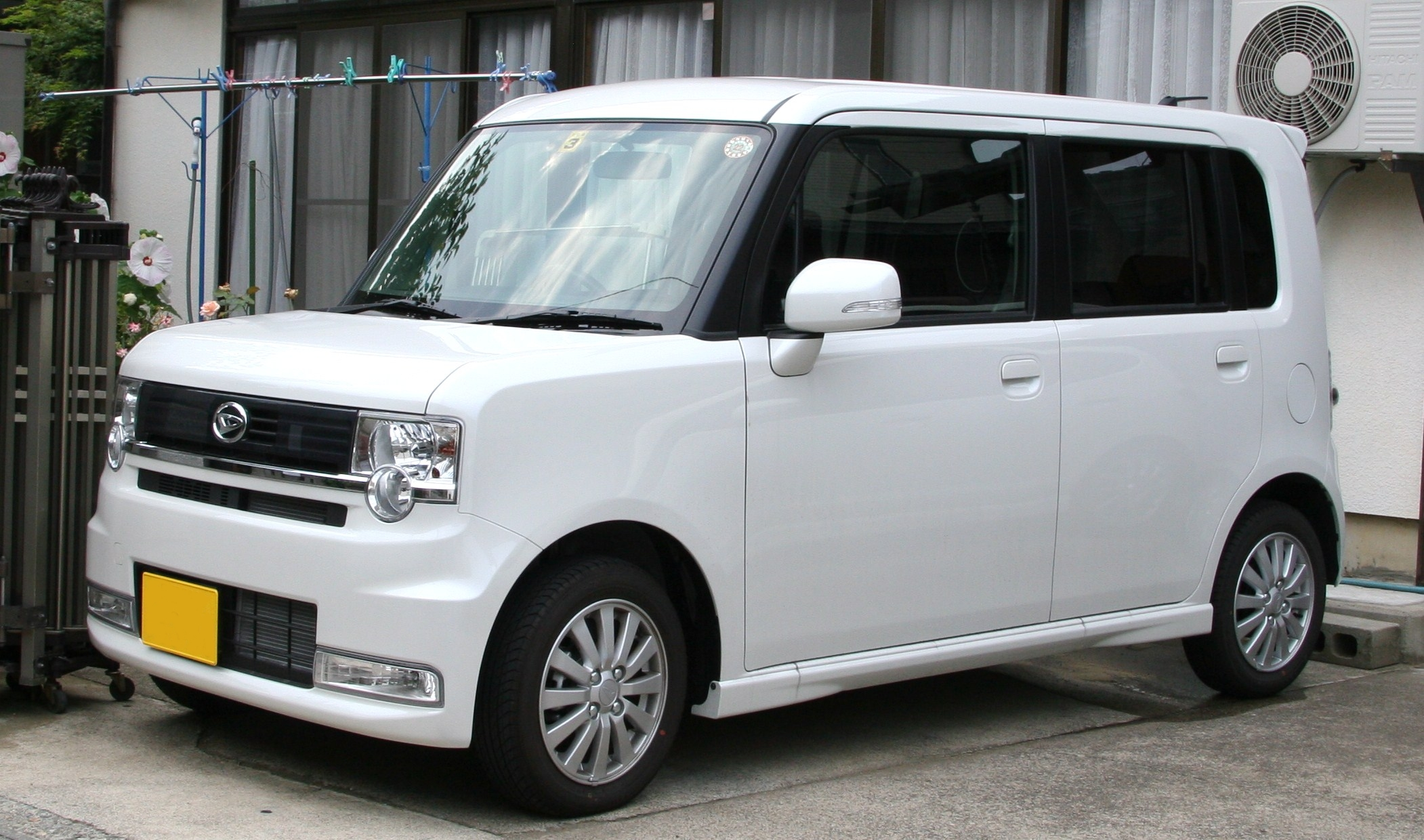
Move Conte Custom X (L575S; pre-facelift)

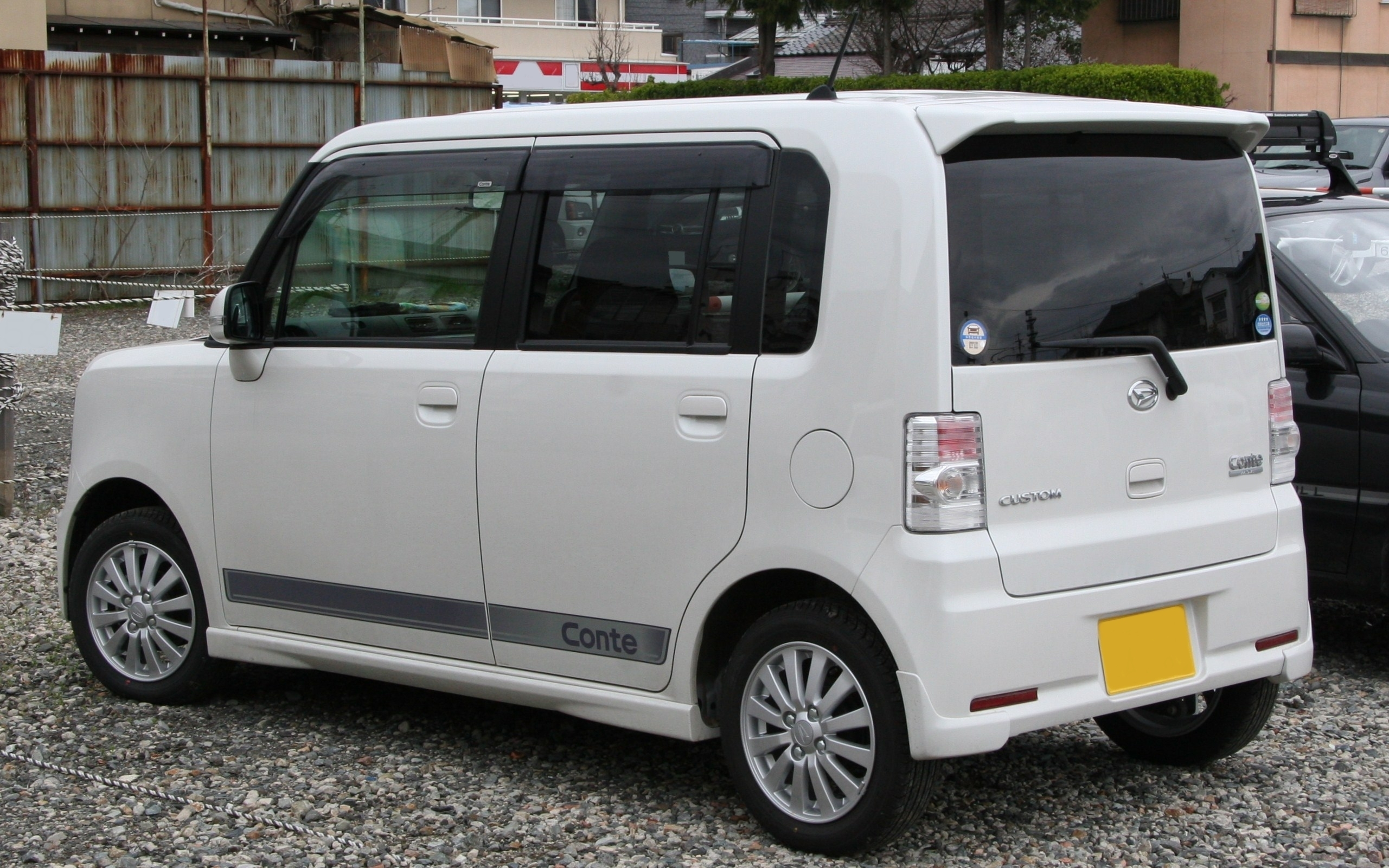
Move Conte Custom X (L575S)

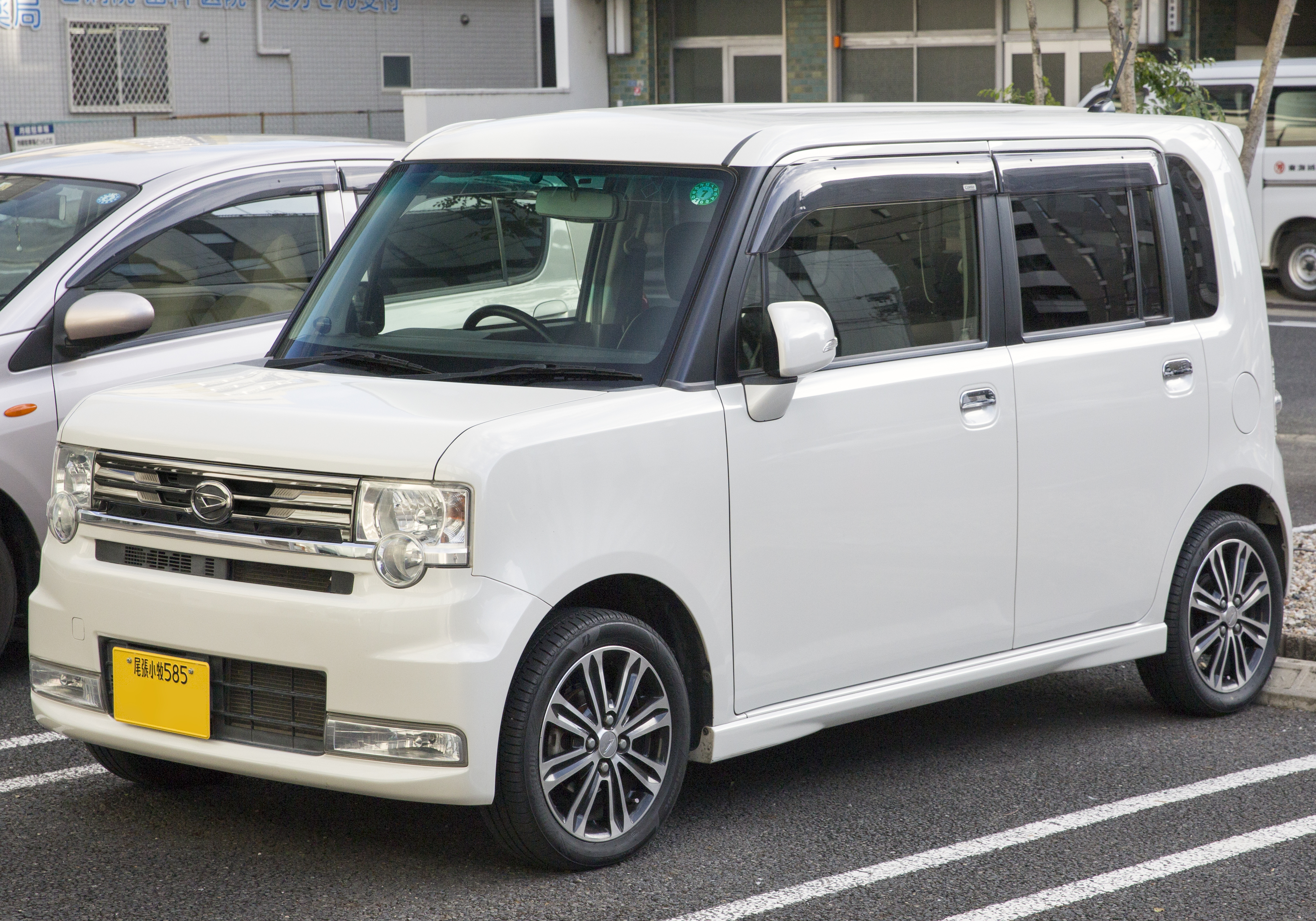
Move Conte Custom X VS (2011 facelift)

Pixis Space

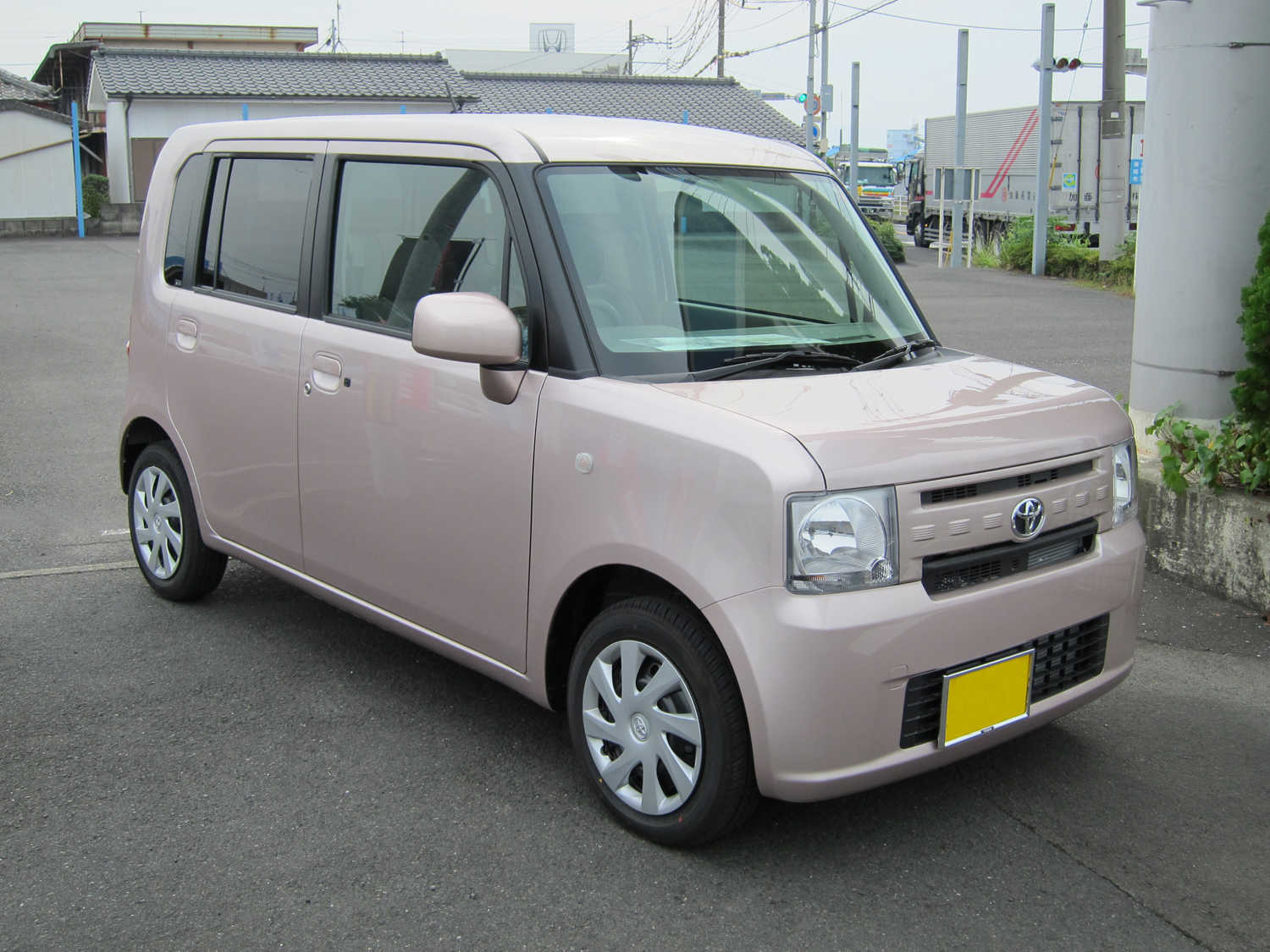
Toyota Pixis Space (L575A)

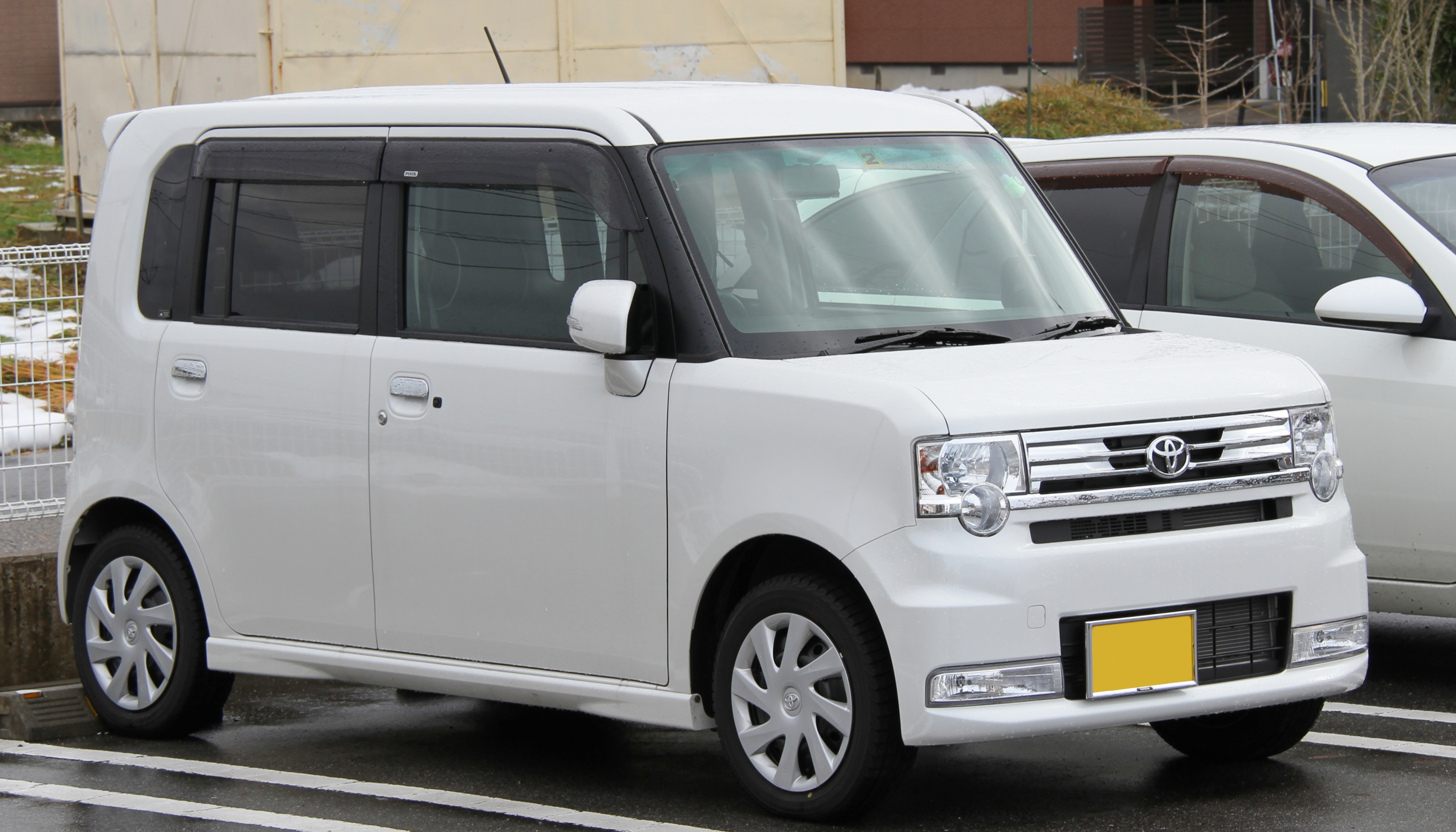
Pixis Space Custom X (L575A)

== Sales ==
Year	Japan
2010	45,829
2011	36,267
2012	38,287
2013	30,879
2014	25,030
2015	11,821
2016	6,693
2017	1,632
