= Daihatsu Tanto Exe =

Kei car model from Daihatsu

Daihatsu Tanto Exe (L455)
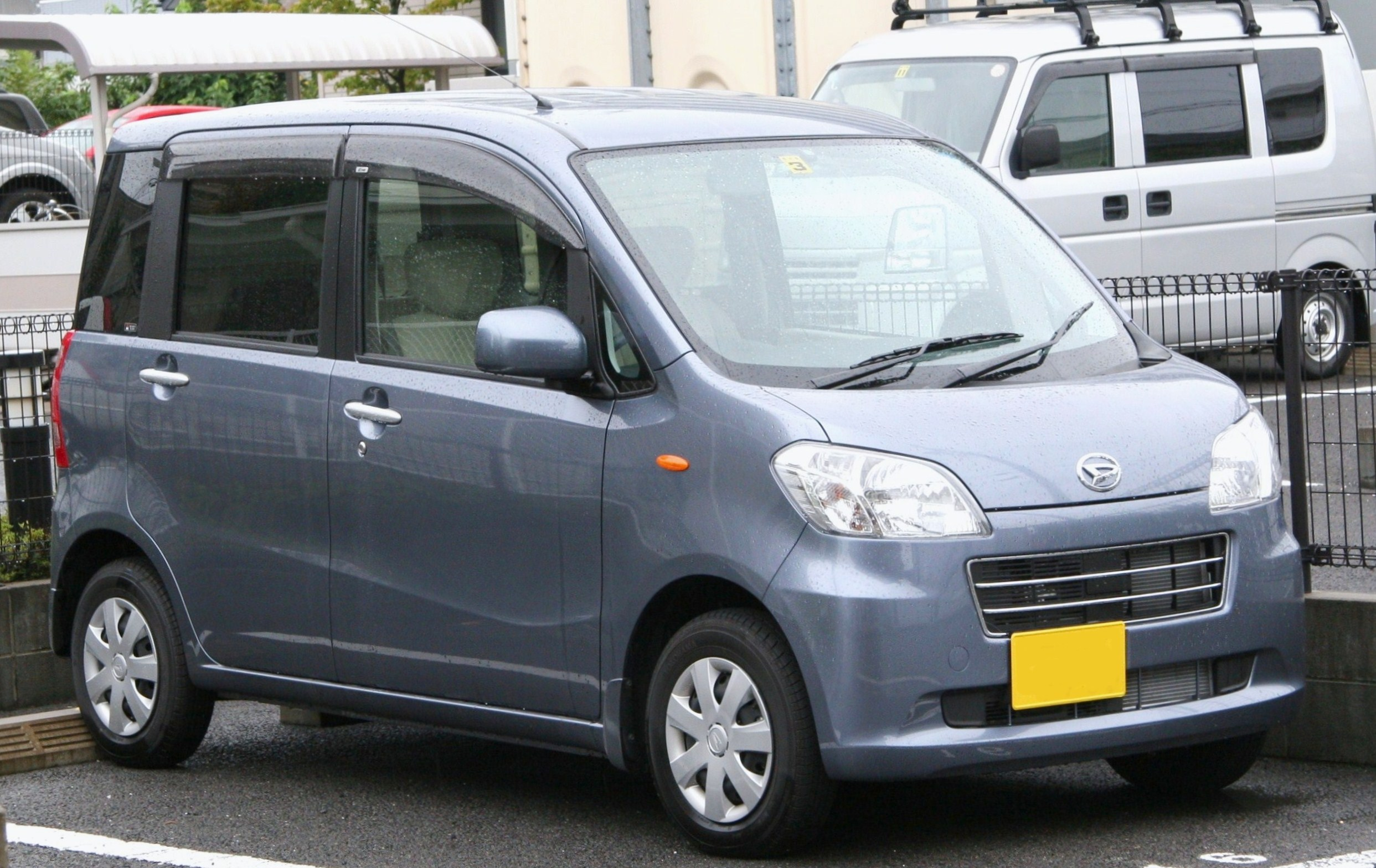

Overview
- Manufacturer: Daihatsu
- Also called: Subaru Lucra
- Production: December 2009 – October 2014 (Tanto Exe); April 2010 – May 2015 (Lucra)
- Assembly: Japan: Nakatsu, Ōita (Daihatsu Motor Kyushu)
- Designer: Yuji Kitagawa (all models); Shun Ohoka and Takahiro Masuda (regular model)

Body and chassis
- Class: Kei car
- Body style: 5-door hatchback
- Layout: Front-engine, front-wheel-drive; Front-engine, four-wheel-drive
- Related: Daihatsu Tanto (L375)

Powertrain
- Engine: Petrol: 658 cc KF-VE I3; 658 cc KF-DET turbo I3
- Power output: 43 kW (58 hp; 58 PS) (KF-VE); 47 kW (63 hp; 64 PS) (KF-DET)
- Transmission: CVT (FWD); 4-speed automatic (4WD)

Dimensions
- Wheelbase: 2,490 mm (98.0 in)
- Length: 3,395 mm (133.7 in)
- Width: 1,475 mm (58.1 in)
- Height: 1,730 mm (68.1 in)
- Kerb weight: 870–980 kg (1,918–2,161 lb)

Chronology
- Successor: Daihatsu Tanto (LA600); Subaru Chiffon (LA600) (Lucra)

The Daihatsu Tanto Exe (Japanese: ダイハツ・タントエグゼ, Hepburn: Daihatsu Tanto Eguze) is a kei car manufactured by the Japanese carmaker Daihatsu. The Tanto Exe made its debut at the 2009 Tokyo Motor Show and was launched on 24 December 2009. It was also sold by Subaru as the Subaru Lucra (Japanese: スバル・ルクラ, Hepburn: Subaru Rukura), which was launched on 20 April 2010.

It was based on the L375 series Tanto and designed to compete with models such as the Honda Life, Nissan Moco and Suzuki Wagon R. The Tanto Exe was more comfort-oriented than the standard Tanto which more oriented for a flexible seat arrangement and maximum interior space. The left sliding door had also been eliminated for a more common side-hinged doors that reduces the weight by 60 kg (132 lb). The Tanto Exe/Lucra Custom, a sports-oriented version of the Tanto Exe/Lucra with sports styling, was also available. The Tanto Exe/Lucra series was available in two engine options: a naturally aspirated 658 cc KF-VE and a turbocharged 658 cc KF-DET three-cylinder petrol units mated to a continuously variable transmission on front-wheel drive models and 4-speed automatic unit on four-wheel drive models.

The Tanto Exe series was discontinued on 2 October 2014, due to declining sales caused by the launch of the LA600 series Tanto a year earlier. The Lucra series followed it into retirement later, on 1 April 2015, due to changing tax consumption rules.

== Gallery ==
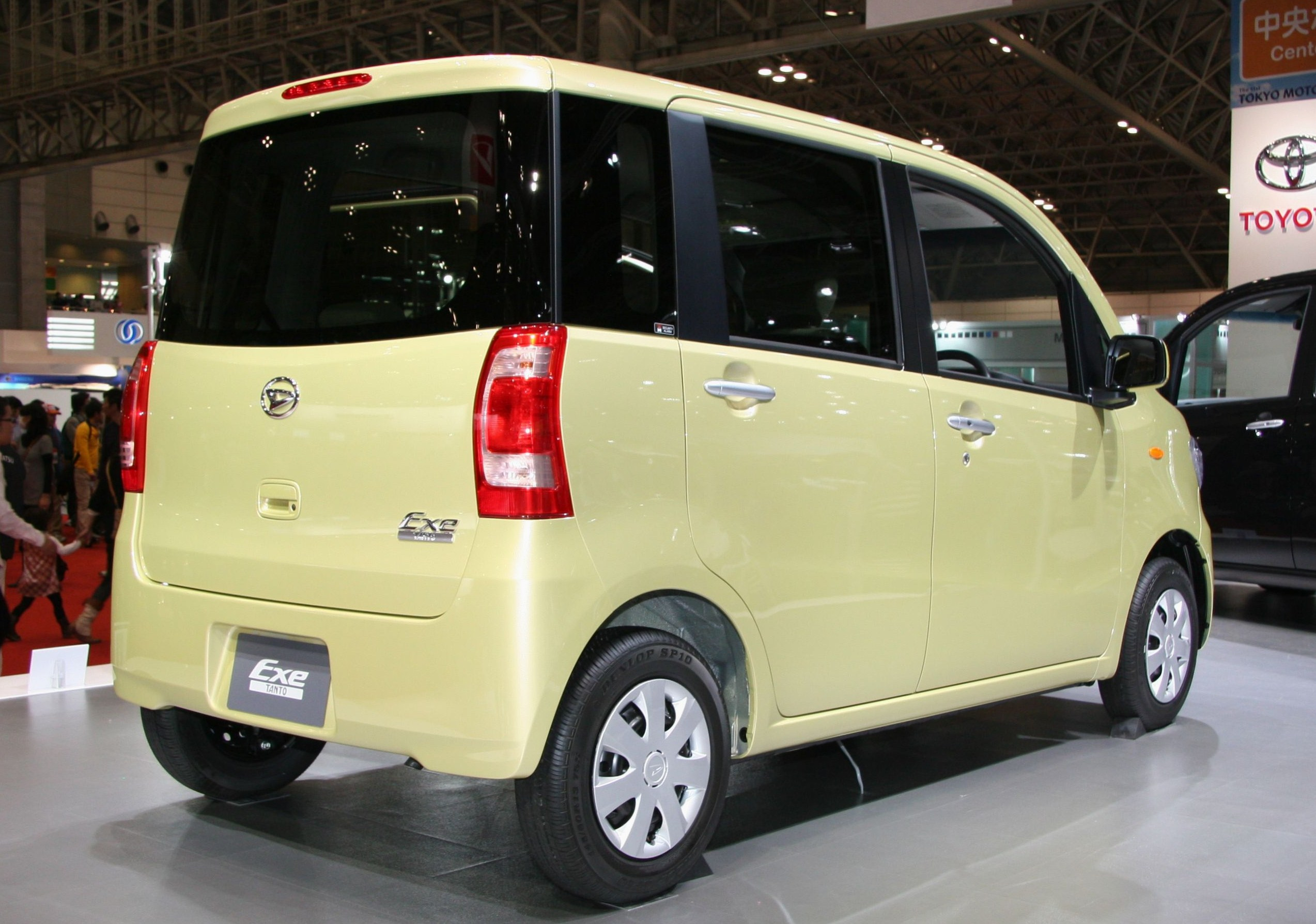
Rear view

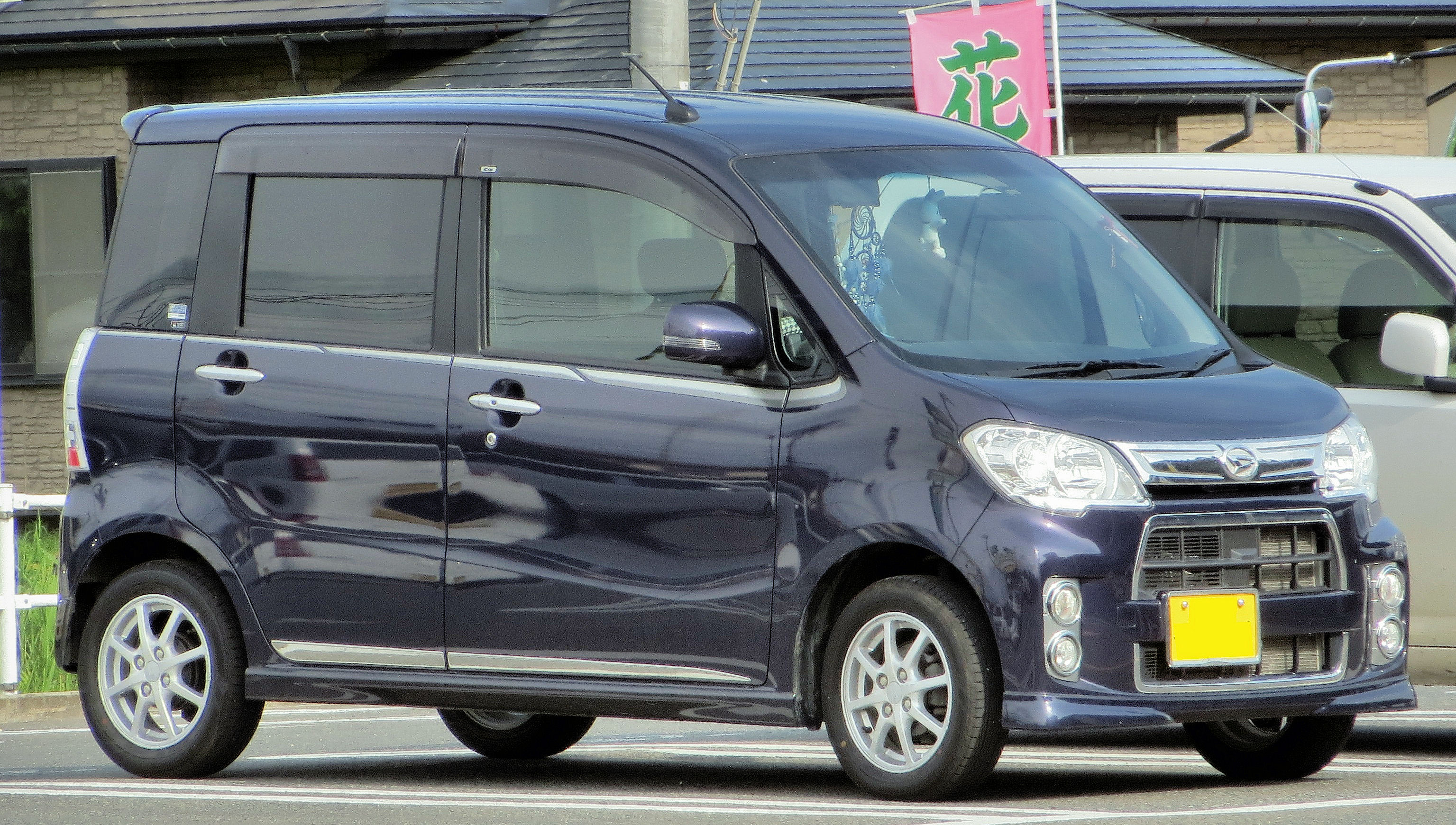
Tanto Exe Custom G (L455S)

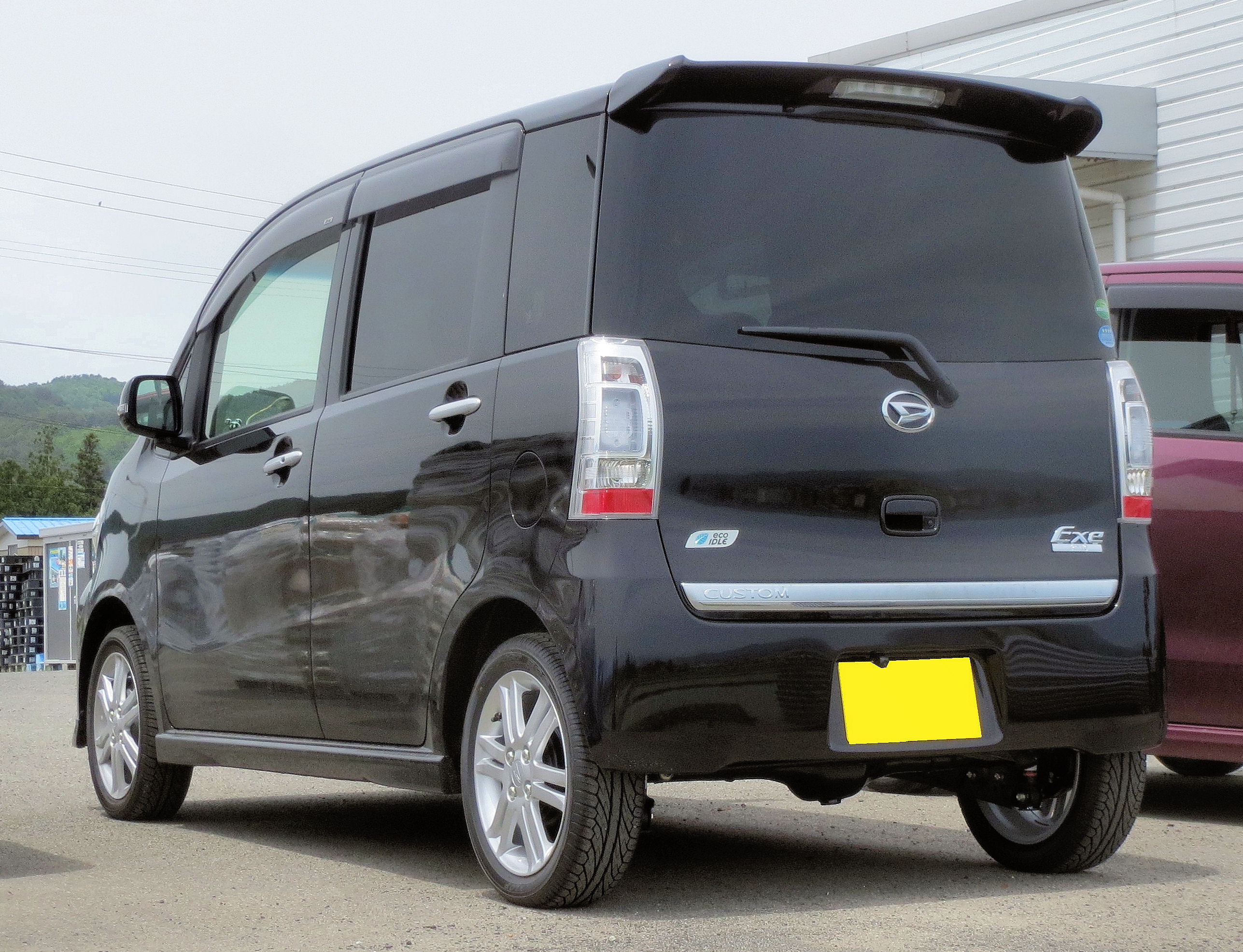
Tanto Exe Custom RS Turbo 4WD (L465S)

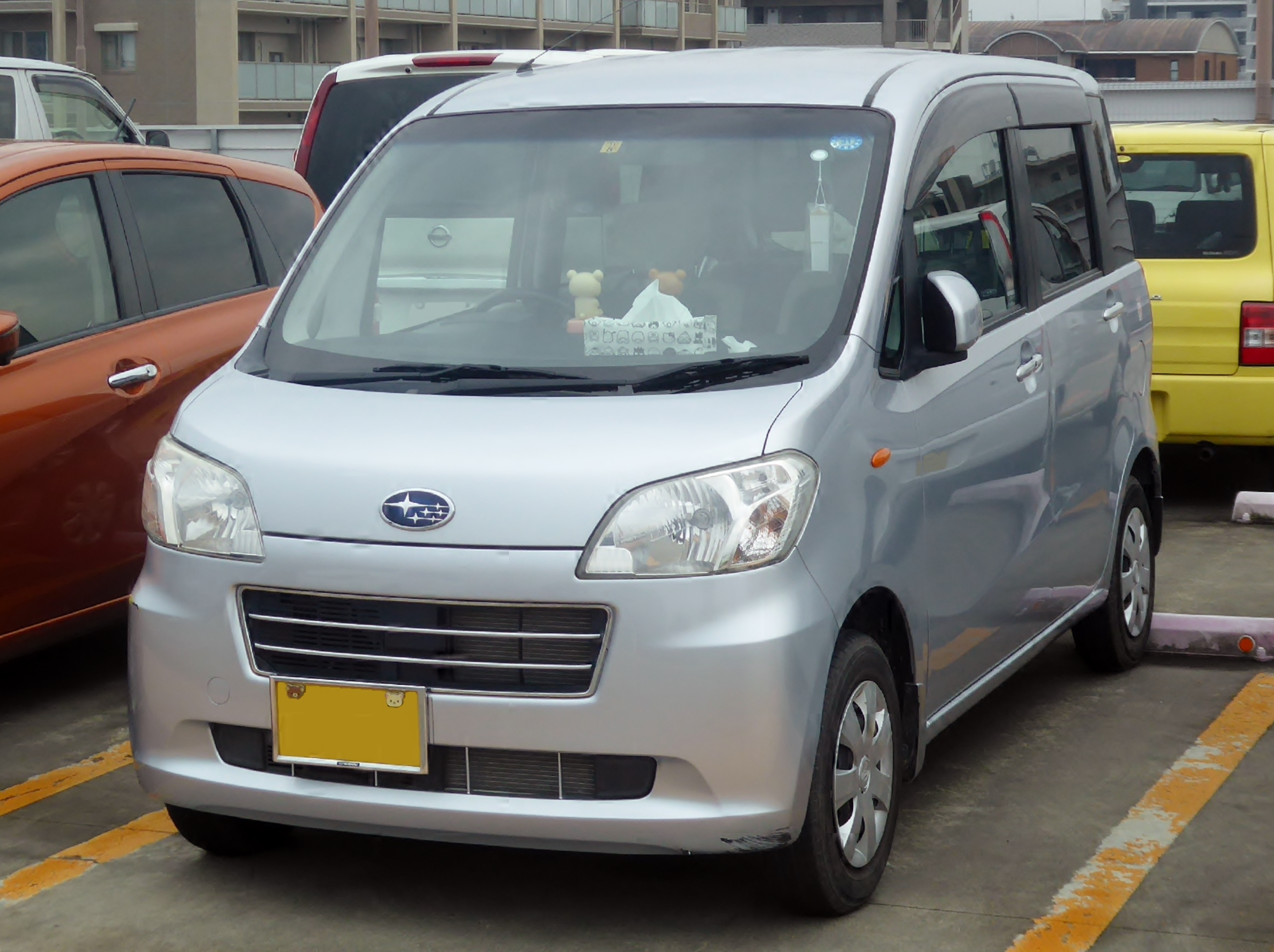
Subaru Lucra L (L455F)

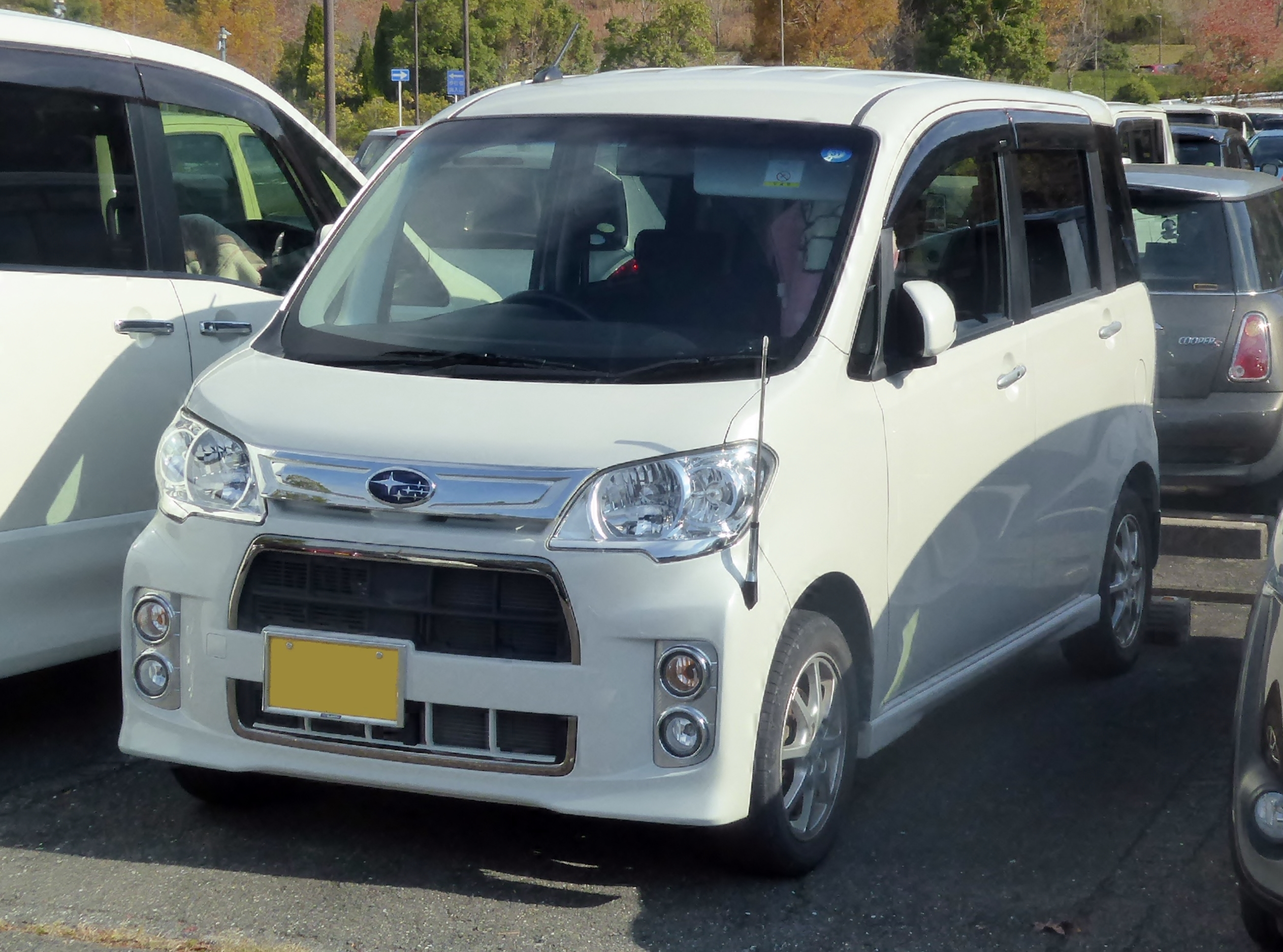
Lucra Custom R Limited (L455F)

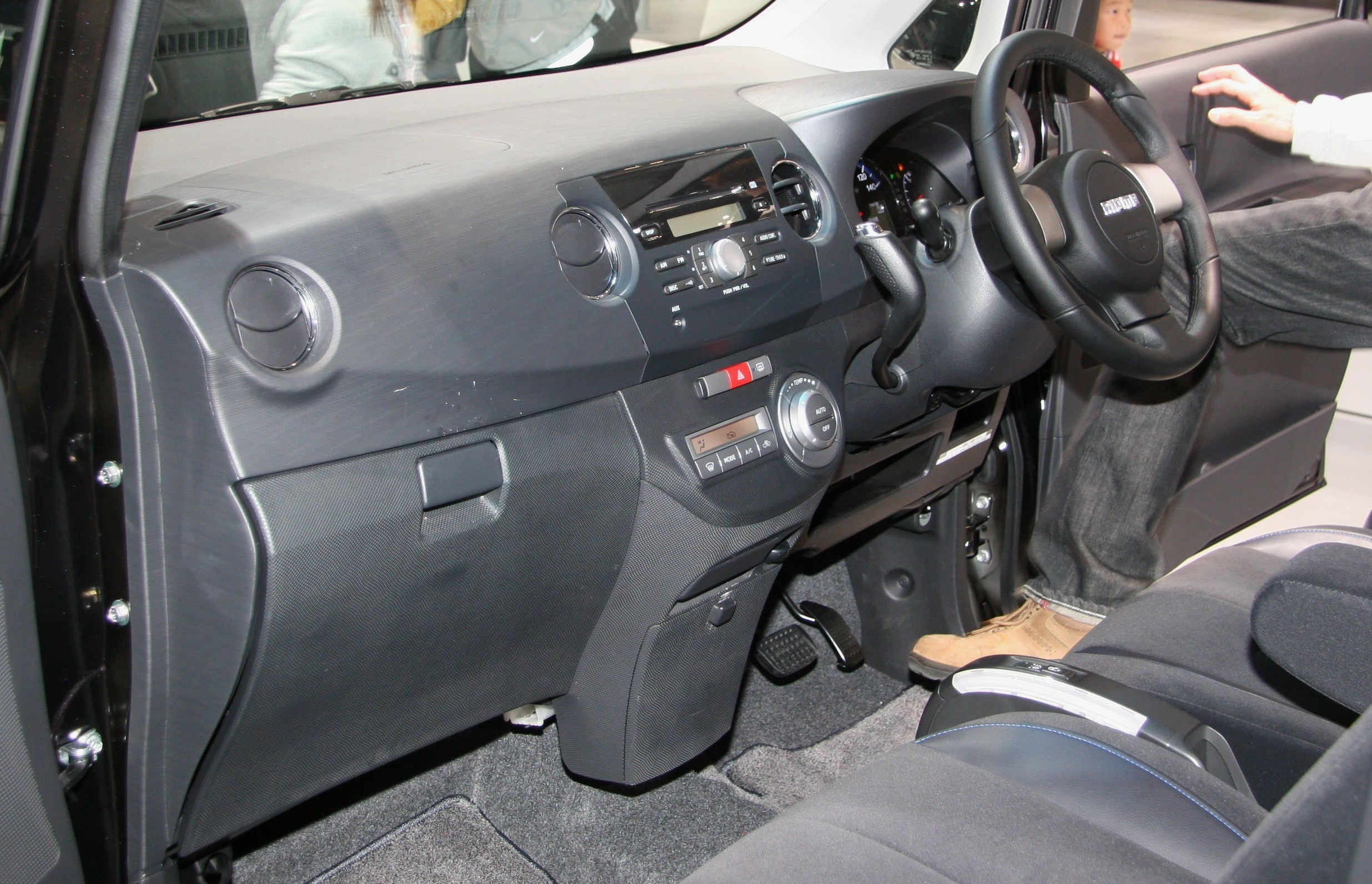
Interior
