= Toyota Pixis =

Automotive nameplate by Toyota

The Toyota Pixis (Japanese: トヨタ・ピクシス, Hepburn: Toyota Pikushisu) is a series of kei cars, kei truck and microvan manufactured by Daihatsu and sold under the Toyota marque, both owned by Toyota Motor Corporation. The name "Pixis" is derived from words "pixie" or "pixy".

- Toyota Pixis Epoch, a rebadged Daihatsu Mira e:S kei car sold since 2012
- Toyota Pixis Joy, a rebadged Daihatsu Cast kei car sold between 2016 and 2023
- Toyota Pixis Mega, a rebadged Daihatsu Wake kei car sold between 2015 and 2022
- Toyota Pixis Space, a rebadged Daihatsu Move Conte kei car sold between 2011 and 2017
- Toyota Pixis Truck, a rebadged Daihatsu Hijet kei truck sold since 2011
- Toyota Pixis Van, a rebadged Daihatsu Hijet Cargo microvan sold since 2011

== Gallery ==
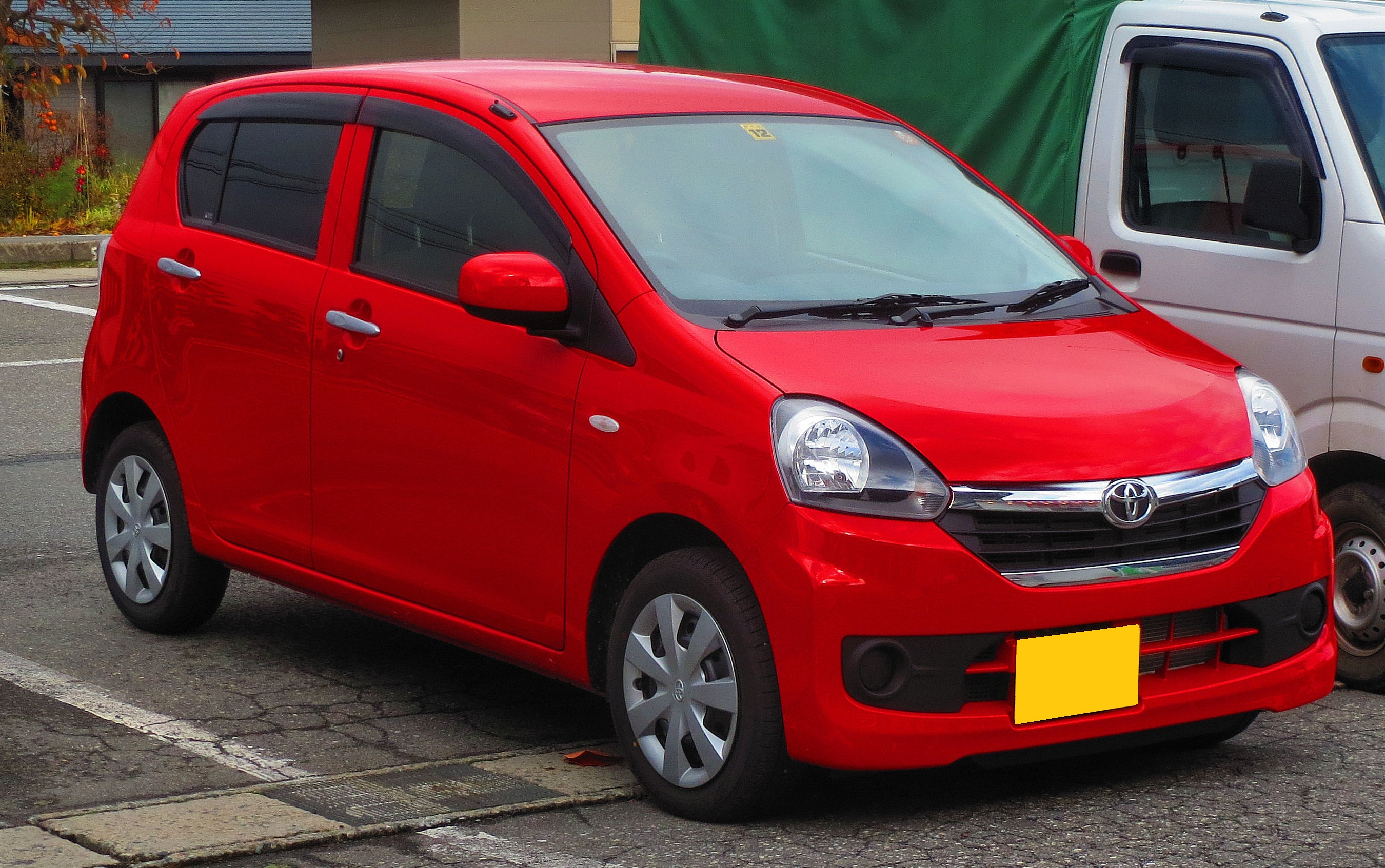
Toyota Pixis Epoch

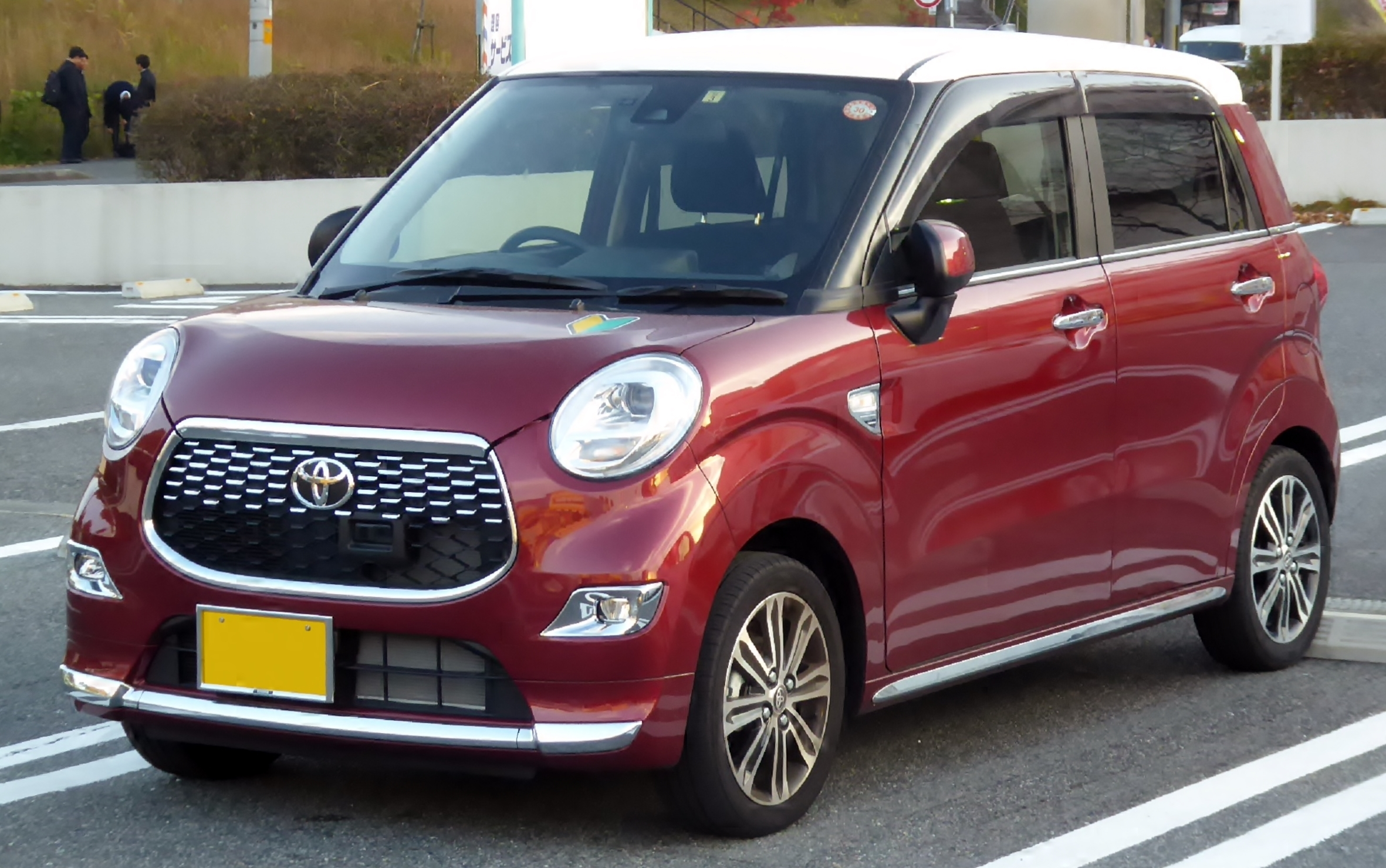
Toyota Pixis Joy

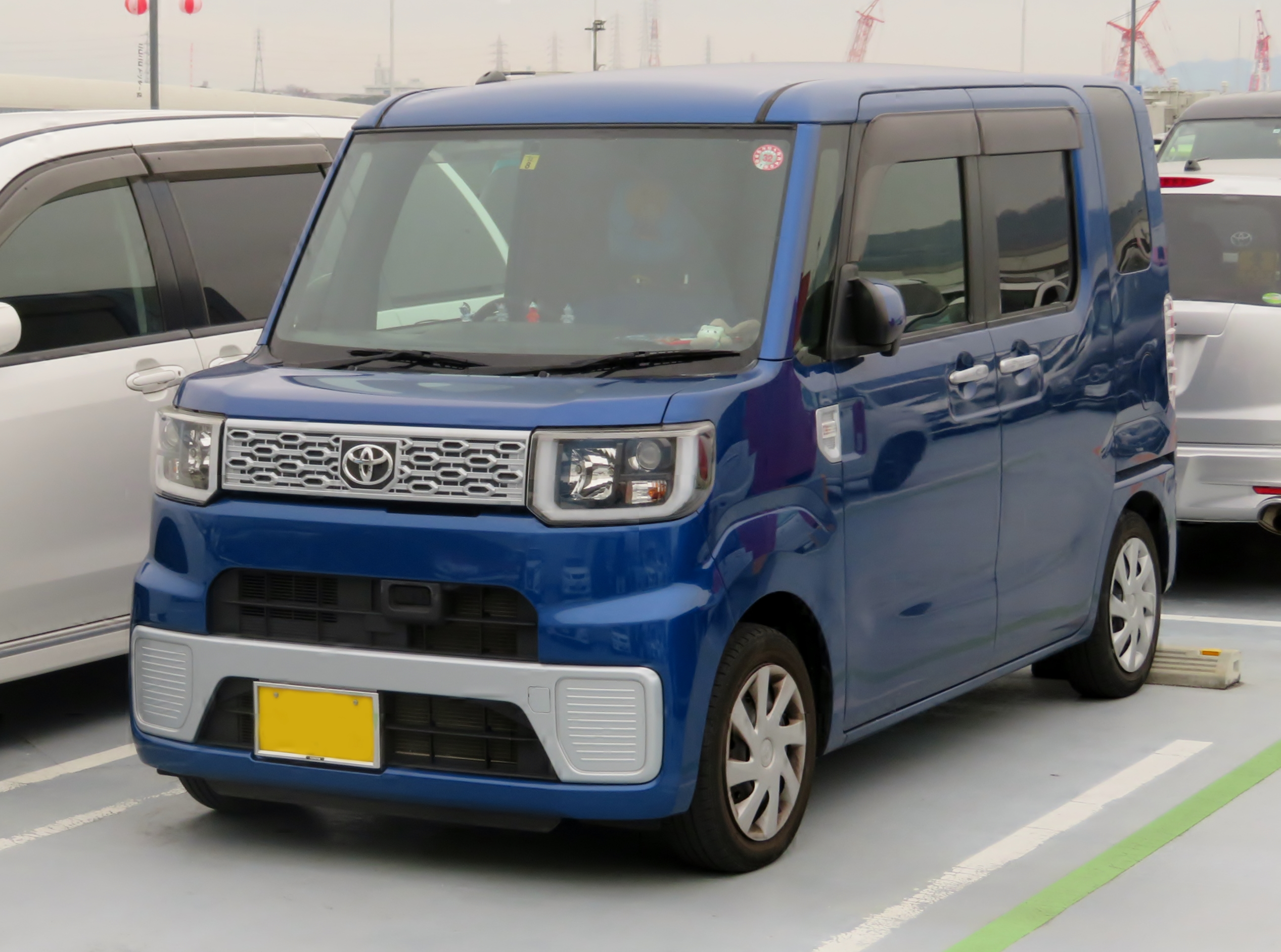
Toyota Pixis Mega

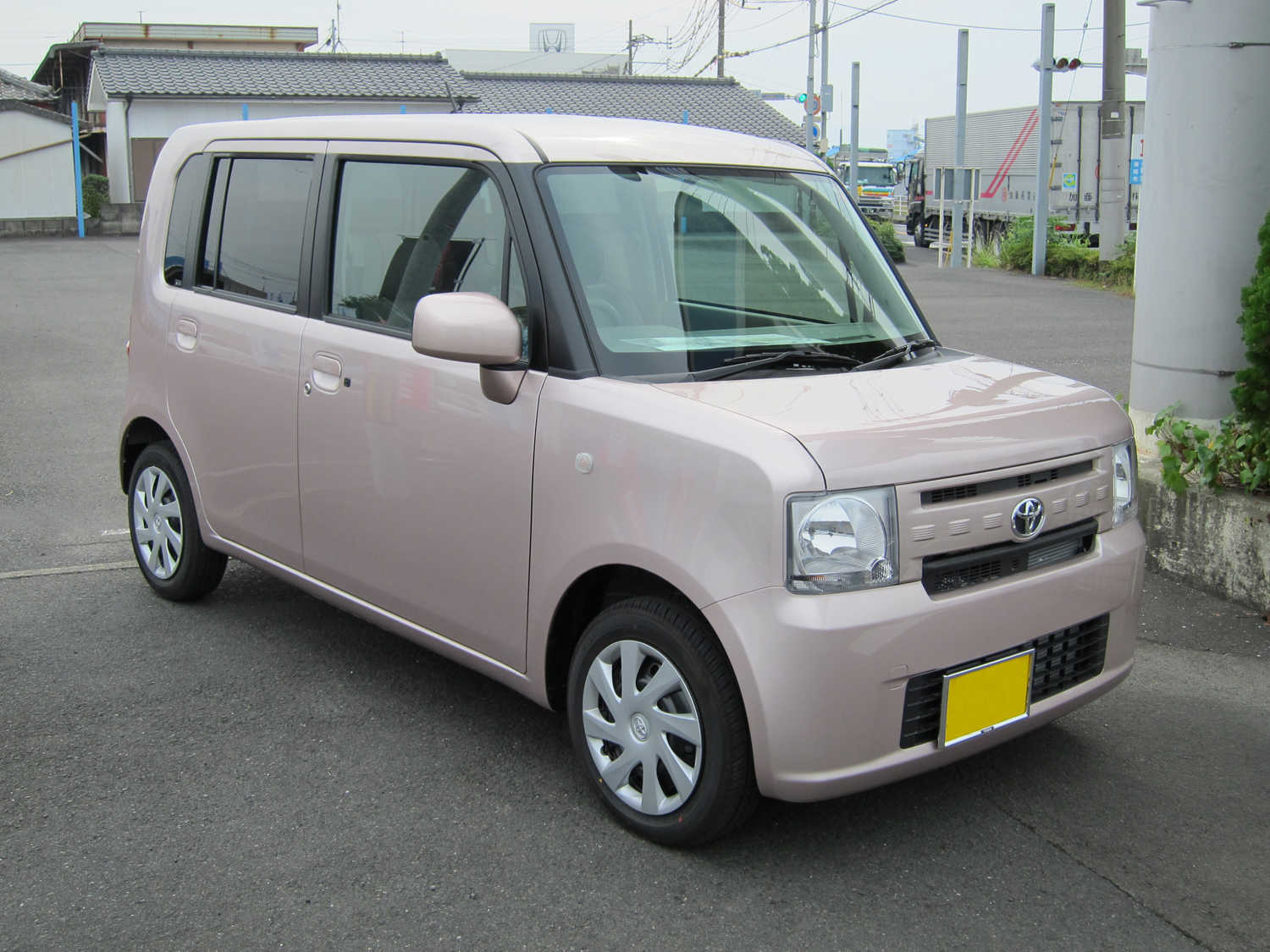
Toyota Pixis Space

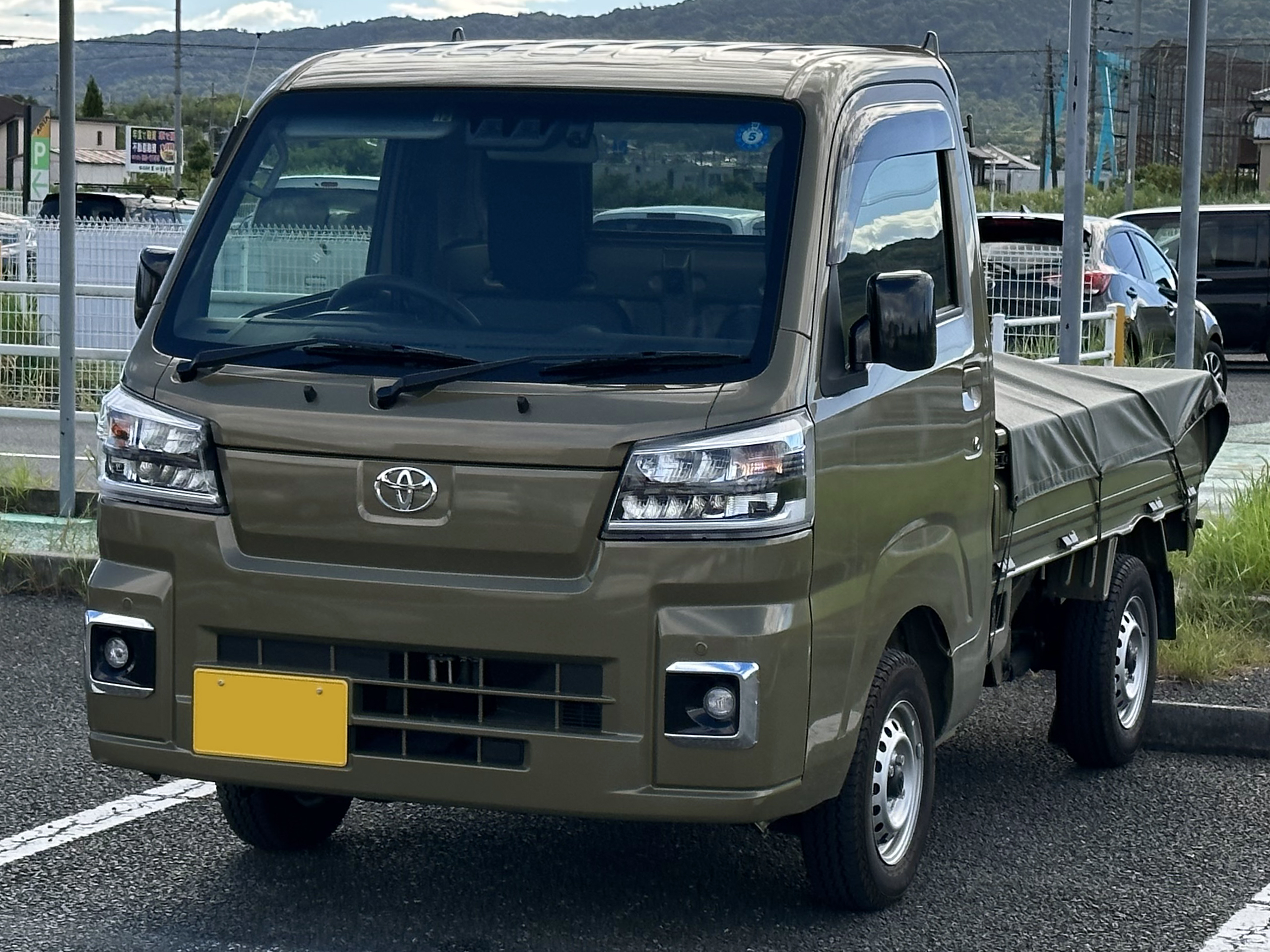
Toyota Pixis Truck

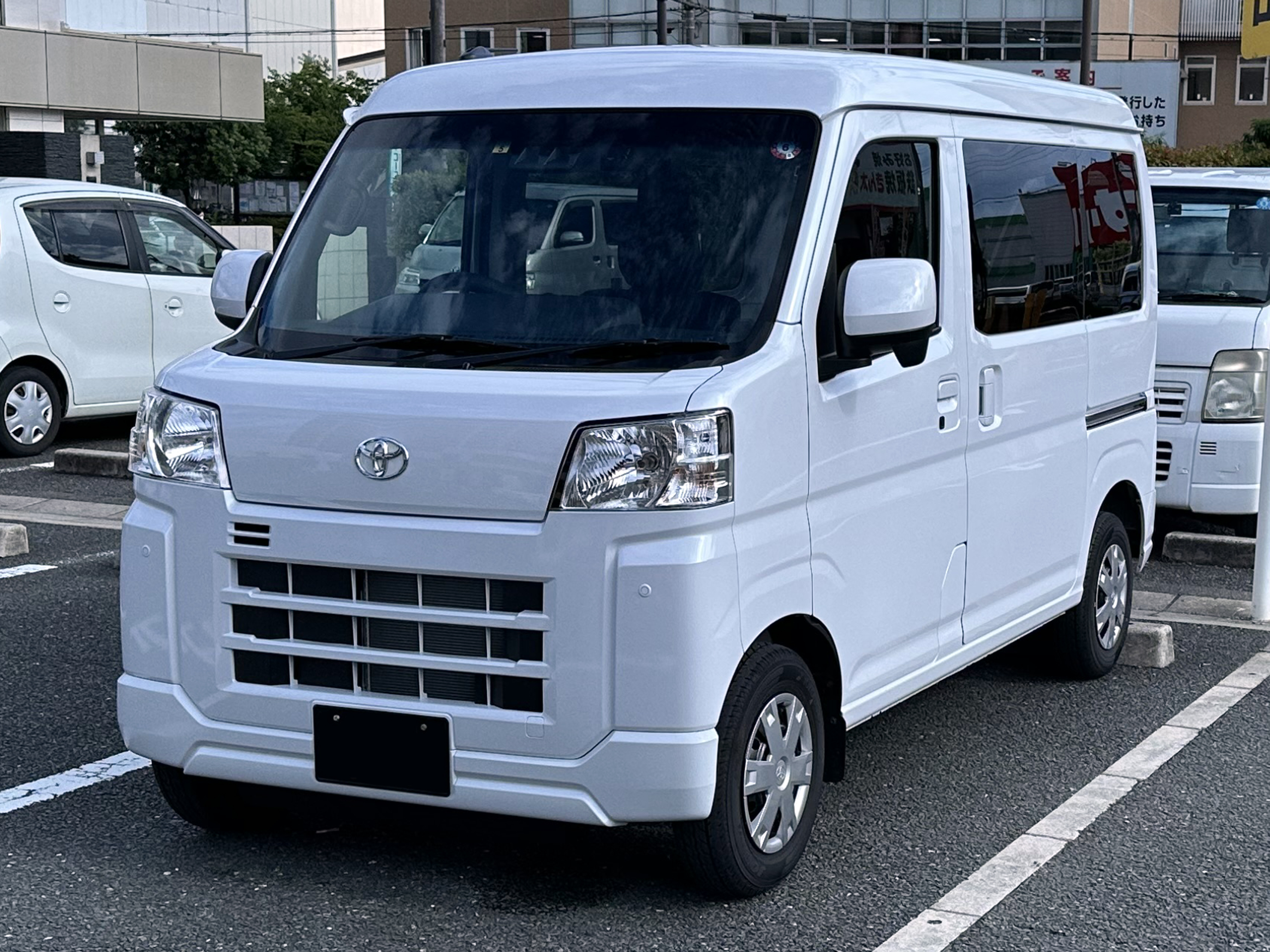
Toyota Pixis Van
