= Daihatsu New Global Architecture =

Automobile platform made by Daihatsu

Overview
- Manufacturer: Daihatsu
- Production: 2019–present

Body and chassis
- Class: Kei car; A-segment; B-segment
- Layout: Front-engine, front-wheel-drive; Front-engine, four-wheel-drive; Front mid-engine, rear-wheel-drive; Front mid-engine, four-wheel-drive

Chronology
- Predecessor: Daihatsu Global A-segment platform (for DNGA-A); Toyota EFC platform (for DNGA-B)

The Daihatsu New Global Architecture (abbreviated as DNGA) is a modular unibody automobile platform that underpin various Daihatsu vehicles and its rebadged versions supplied for Toyota, Subaru, and Perodua. Introduced in 2019, it is aimed for vehicles built for the Japanese market and overseas emerging markets. Daihatsu has planned to introduce the platform to 21 models and 15 body types with a targeted annual production of 2.5 million vehicles to be sold in 90 countries by 2025. Despite the similar naming, it is not mechanically related to the Toyota New Global Architecture.

== Overview ==
The platform was announced in June 2019 through the introduction of the fourth-generation Tanto. Prior to the introduction of the fourth-generation Tanto, the second-generation Mira e:S and the Mira Tocot that were released in 2017 were categorized as DNGA vehicles. However, in 2019 the company revised the definition of DNGA, meaning both models are not classified as DNGA vehicles. Instead, it uses an older transitional platform which is the base of the DNGA platform before it was improved further.

According to Daihatsu, the DNGA is developed with electrification, autonomous driving and connectivity in mind, which is referred as "CASE" (Connected, Automated Driving, Sharing, Electrification).

Most components have been newly developed for the platform, and all components such as the suspension and its mounting points, underbody, engine, transmission, and seating position have been revamped for an optimal and standardized component placement to achieve the desired performance and quality without increasing costs. The structure of chassis parts has been streamlined, and the number of parts has been reduced to reduce weight.

The platform allows for parts sharing rate to exceed 75 percent for kei car models and 80 percent for A-segment and B-segment models. It allows development of new models to its introduction to be 1.5 times faster. Since manufacturing plants are able to utilize a common assembly line for DNGA models, the capital investment of introducing a new product is also reduced by 30 percent. With DNGA in its full usage, the number of platforms produced by Daihatsu would be reduced from 7 types to 4 types.

Despite having a name similarity with the parent company's Toyota New Global Architecture, there are no mentions of the platform being related with the TNGA in Daihatsu publications and literatures. Daihatsu executives had stated the company did not pursue significant commonality with Toyota platforms.

== Applications ==
The chassis, which is the main component of the platform is grouped into three types, which are the kei car segment, A-segment, and B-segment products for emerging markets.

=== Kei cars ===
Vehicles using platform (calendar years):

- Daihatsu Tanto / Subaru Chiffon — LA650 (2019–present)
- Daihatsu Taft — LA900 (2020–present)
- Daihatsu Hijet Cargo / Atrai / Toyota Pixis Van / Subaru Sambar Van / Sambar Dias — S700 (2022–present, RWD-based)
- Daihatsu Move Canbus — LA850 (2022–present)
- Daihatsu Move / Subaru Stella — LA850 (2025–present)
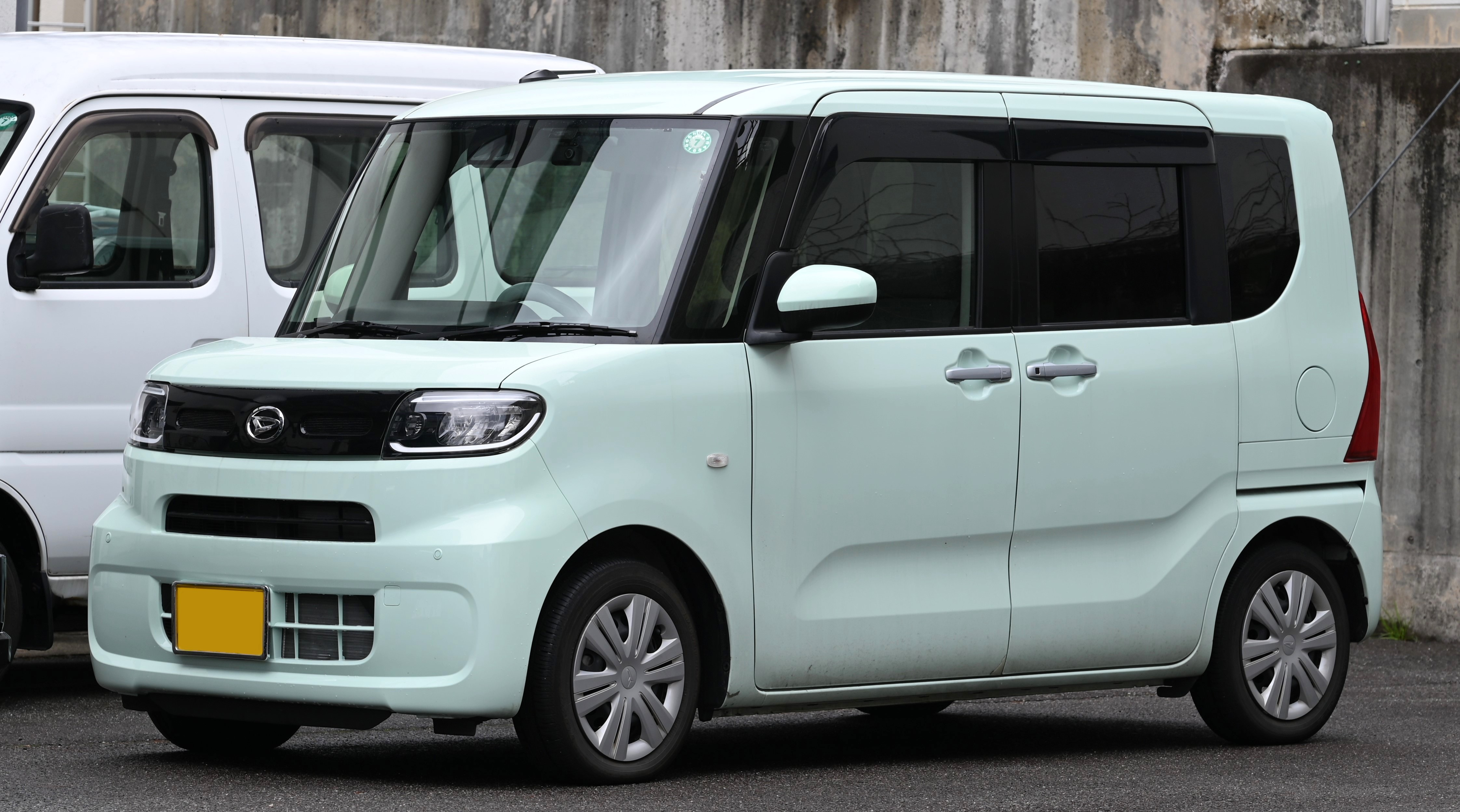
Daihatsu Tanto / Subaru Chiffon

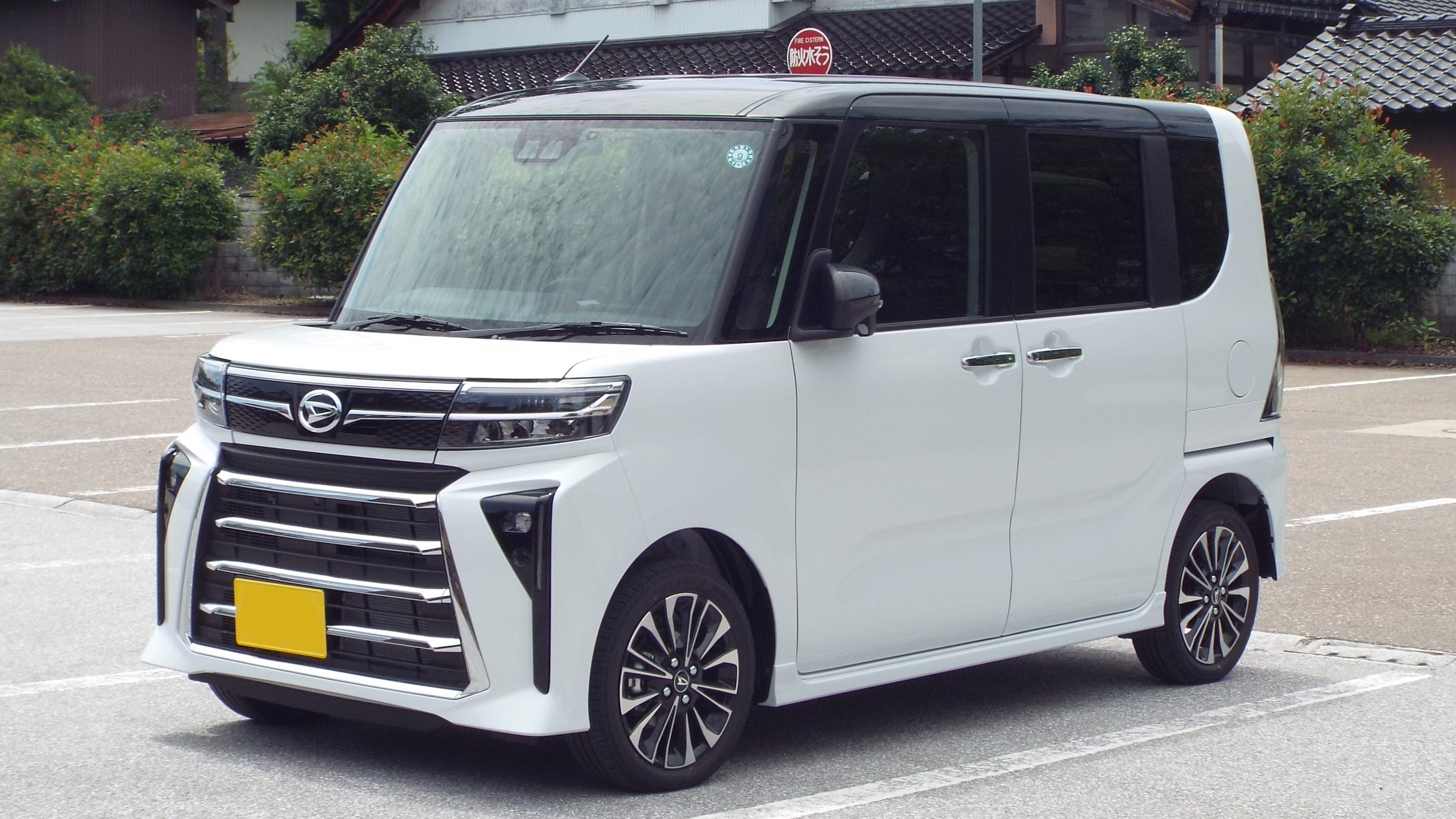
Daihatsu Tanto Custom / Subaru Chiffon Custom

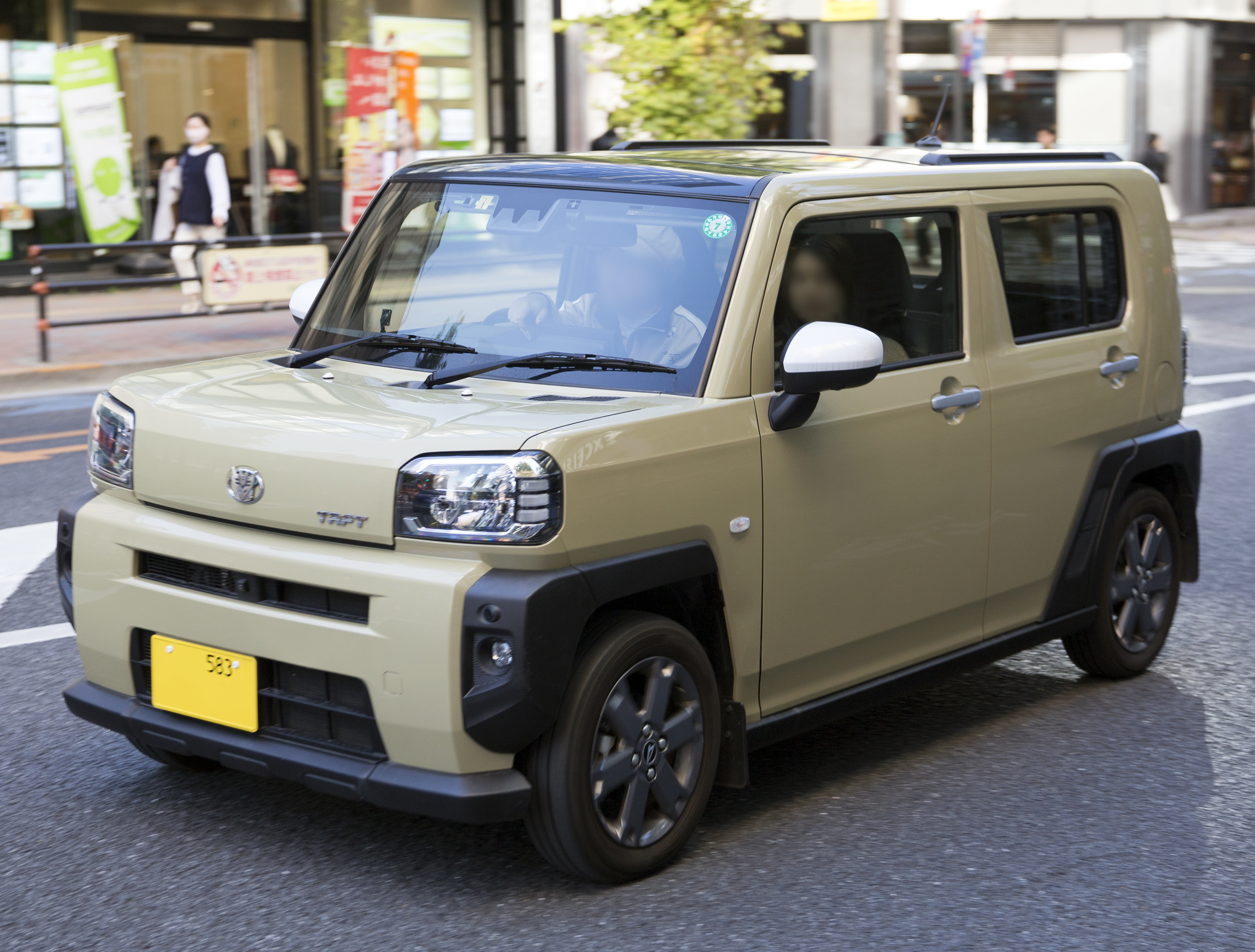
Daihatsu Taft

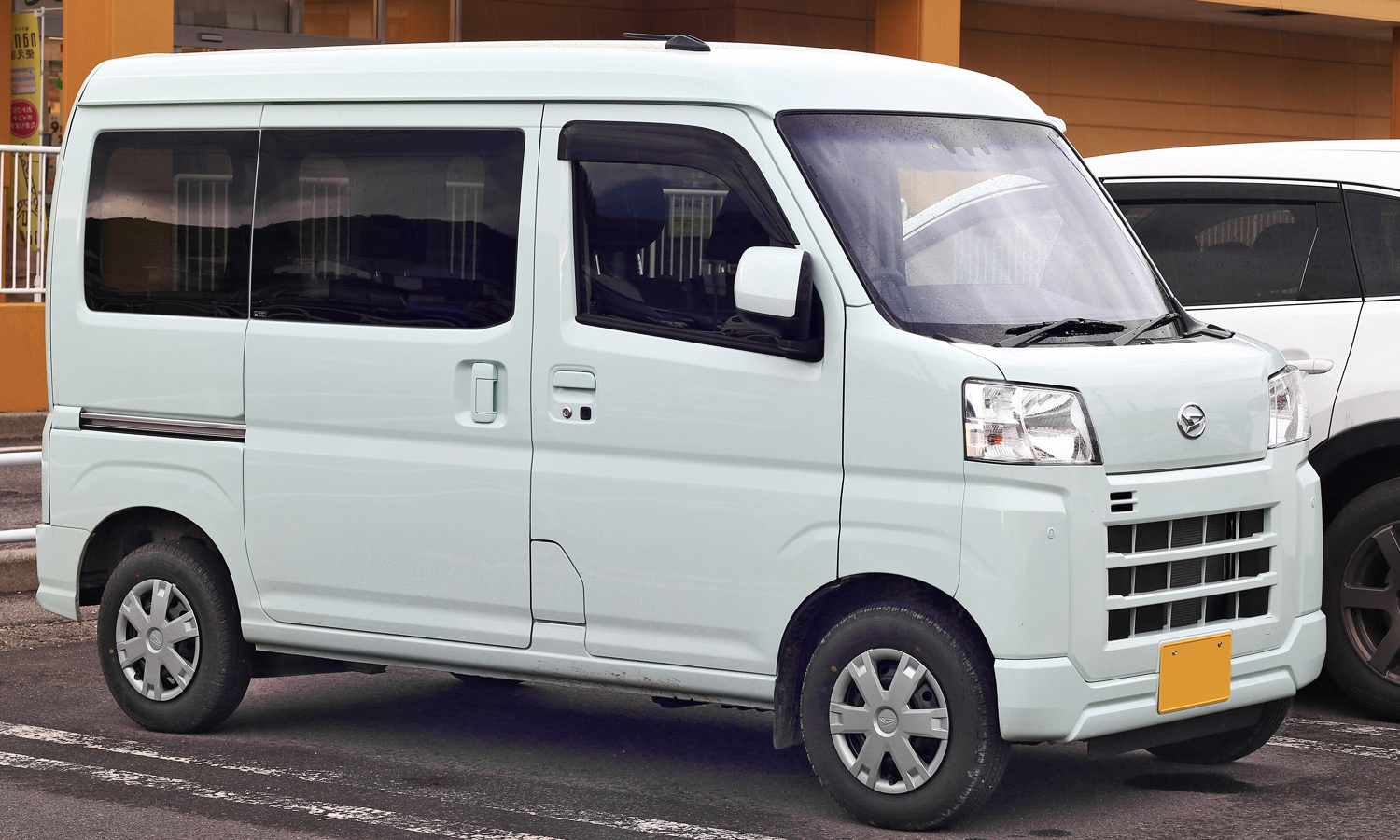
Daihatsu Hijet Cargo / Toyota Pixis Van / Subaru Sambar Van

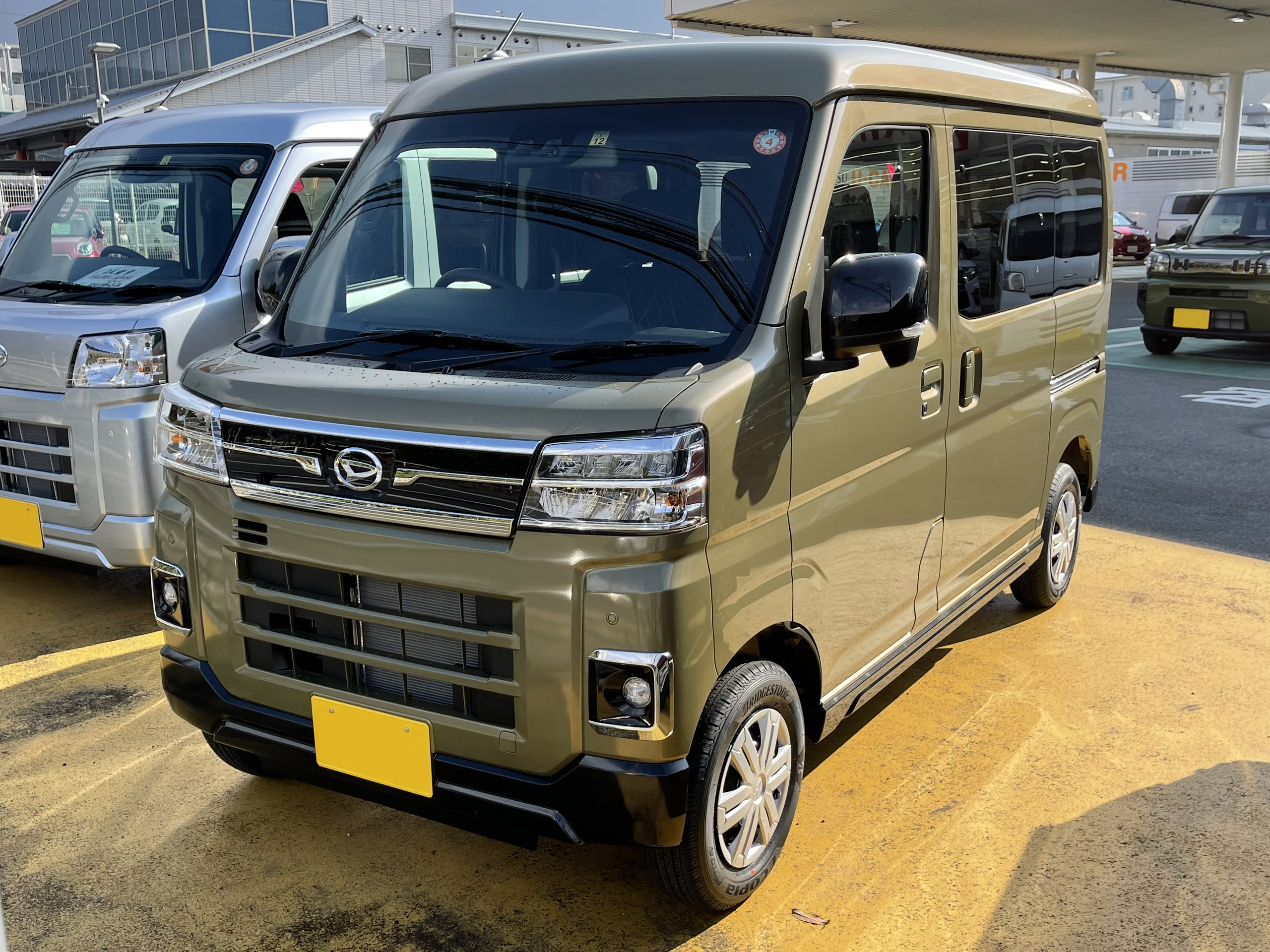
Daihatsu Atrai / Subaru Sambar Dias

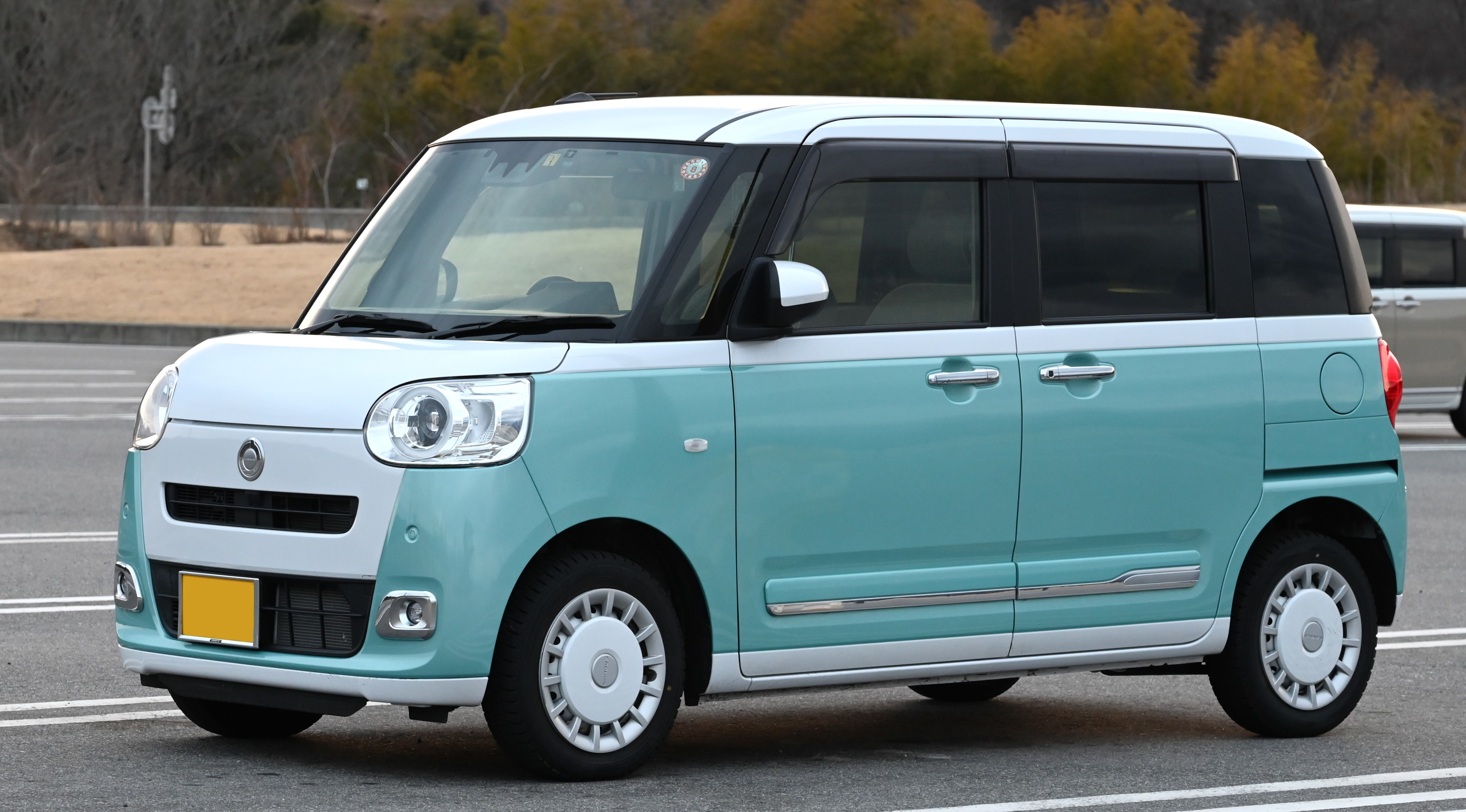
Daihatsu Move Canbus

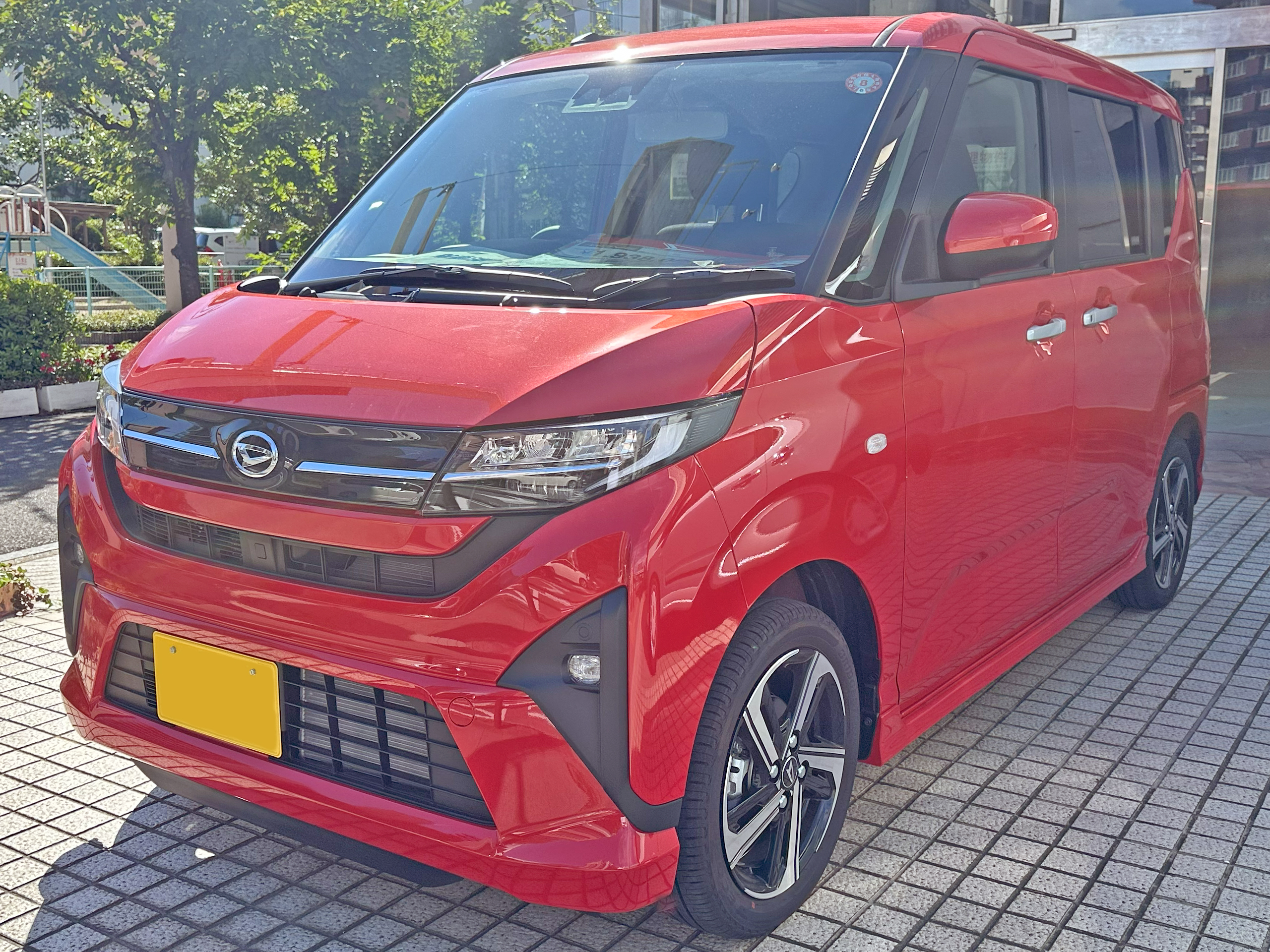
Daihatsu Move / Subaru Stella

=== A-segment (DNGA-A) ===
Vehicles using platform (calendar years):

- Daihatsu Rocky / Toyota Raize / Subaru Rex / Perodua Ativa — A200/A250/A270 (2019–present)
- Daihatsu Ayla / Toyota Agya / Toyota Wego / Perodua Axia — A350/A300 (2023–present)
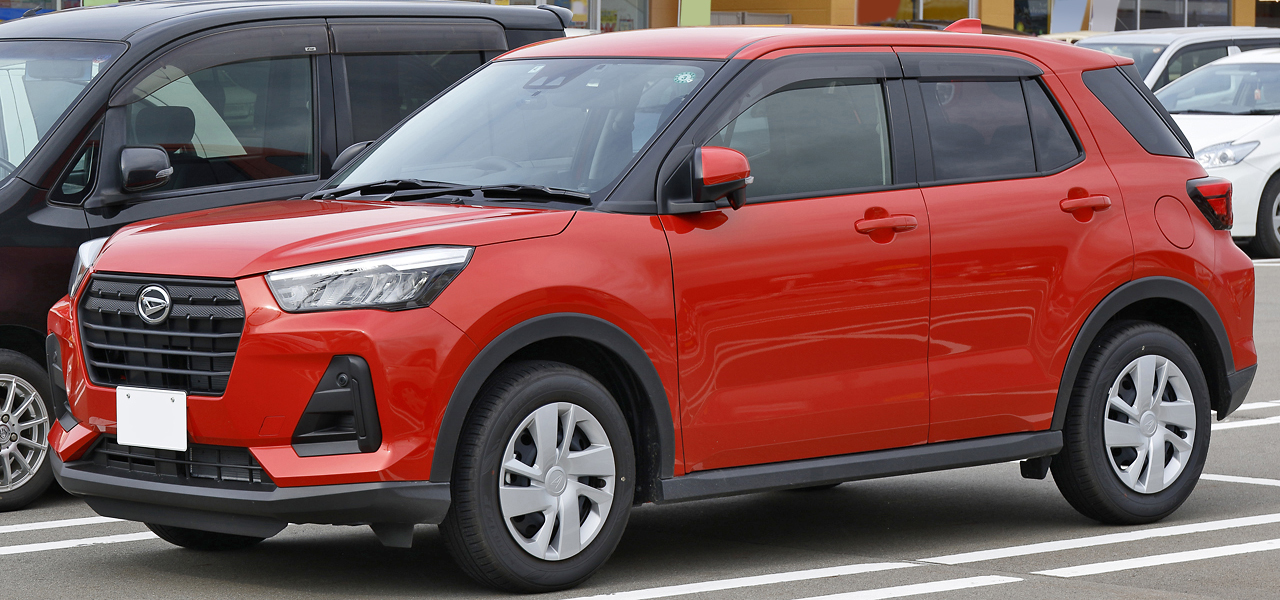
Daihatsu Rocky

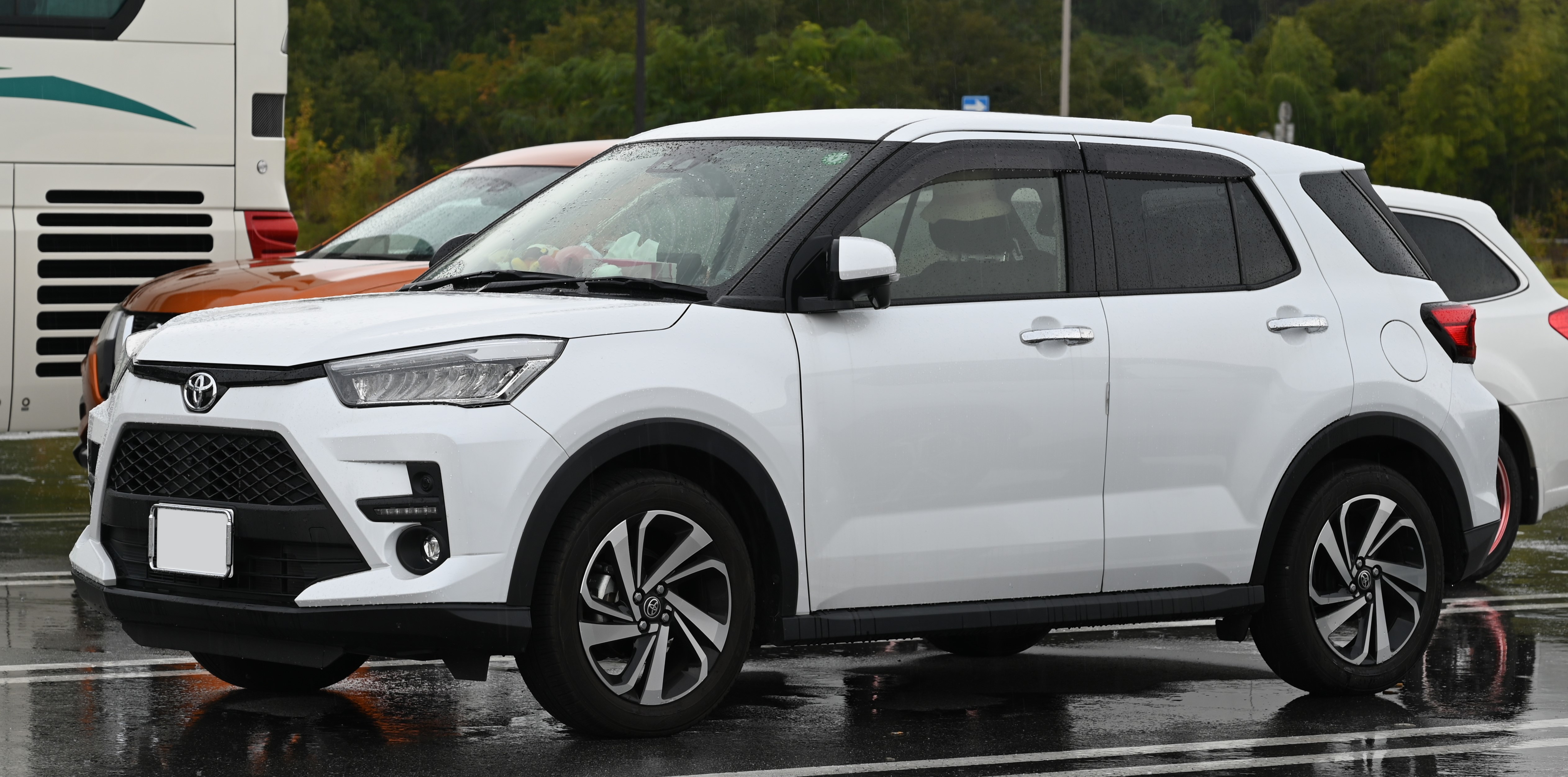
Toyota Raize

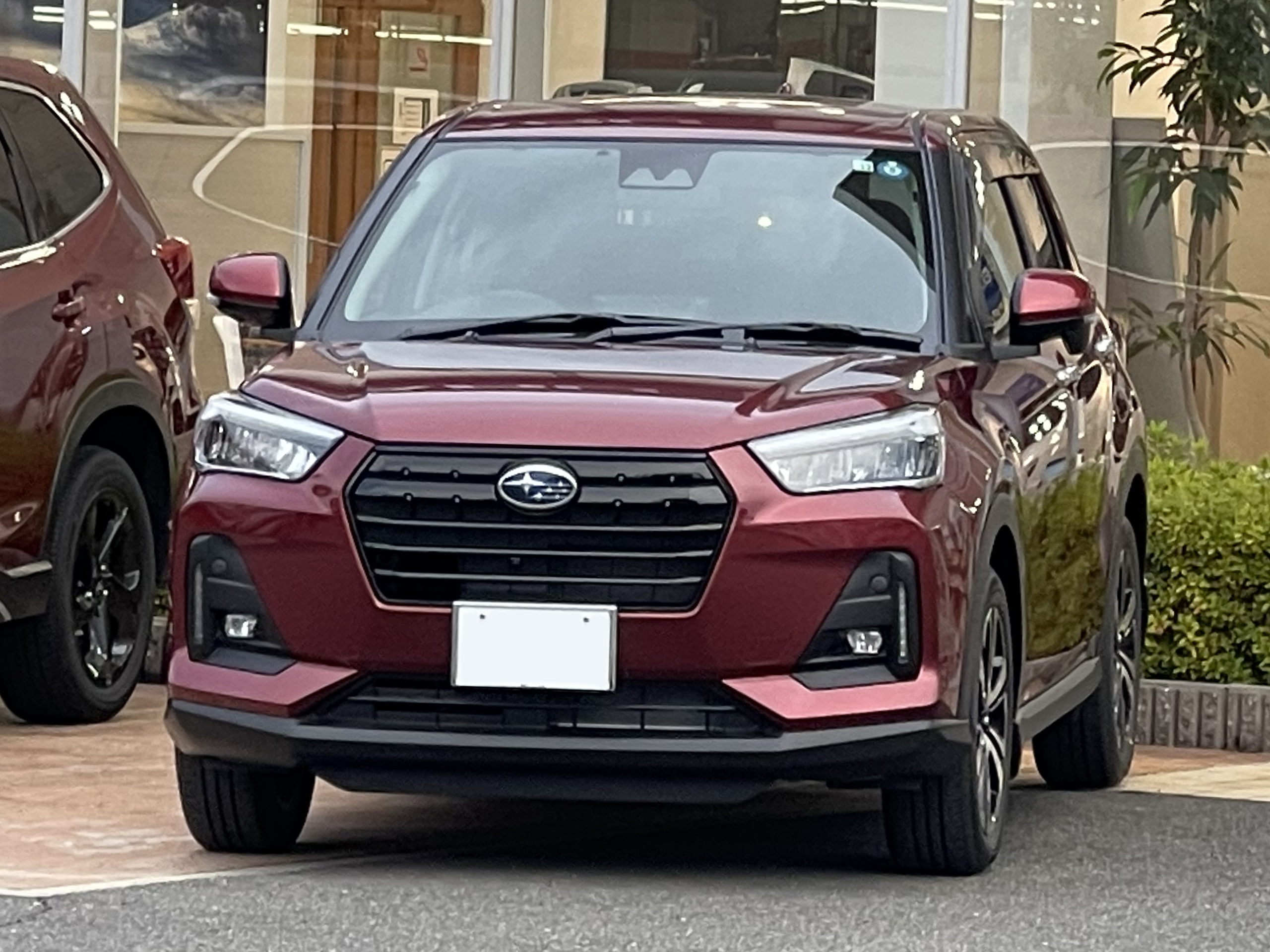
Subaru Rex

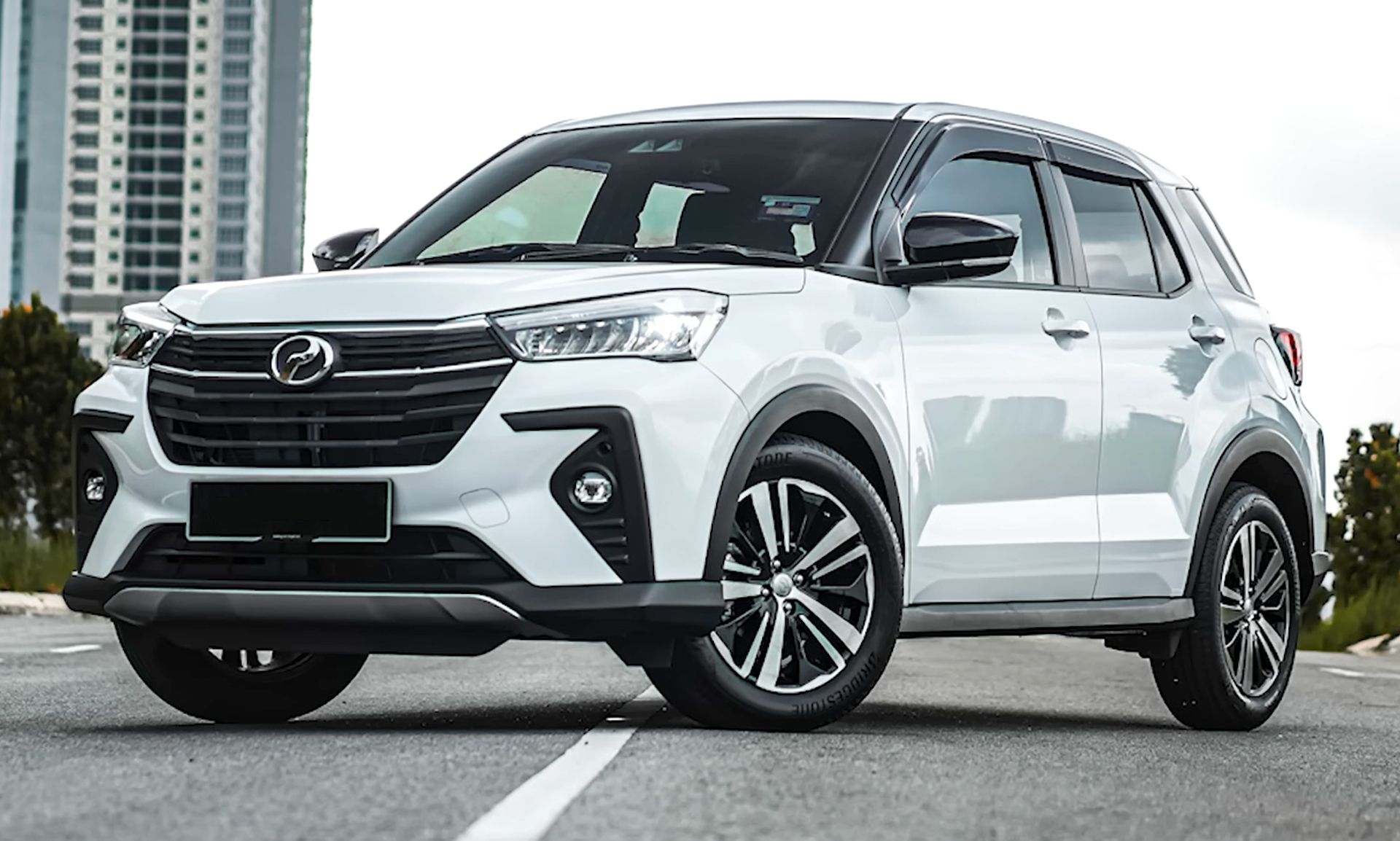
Perodua Ativa

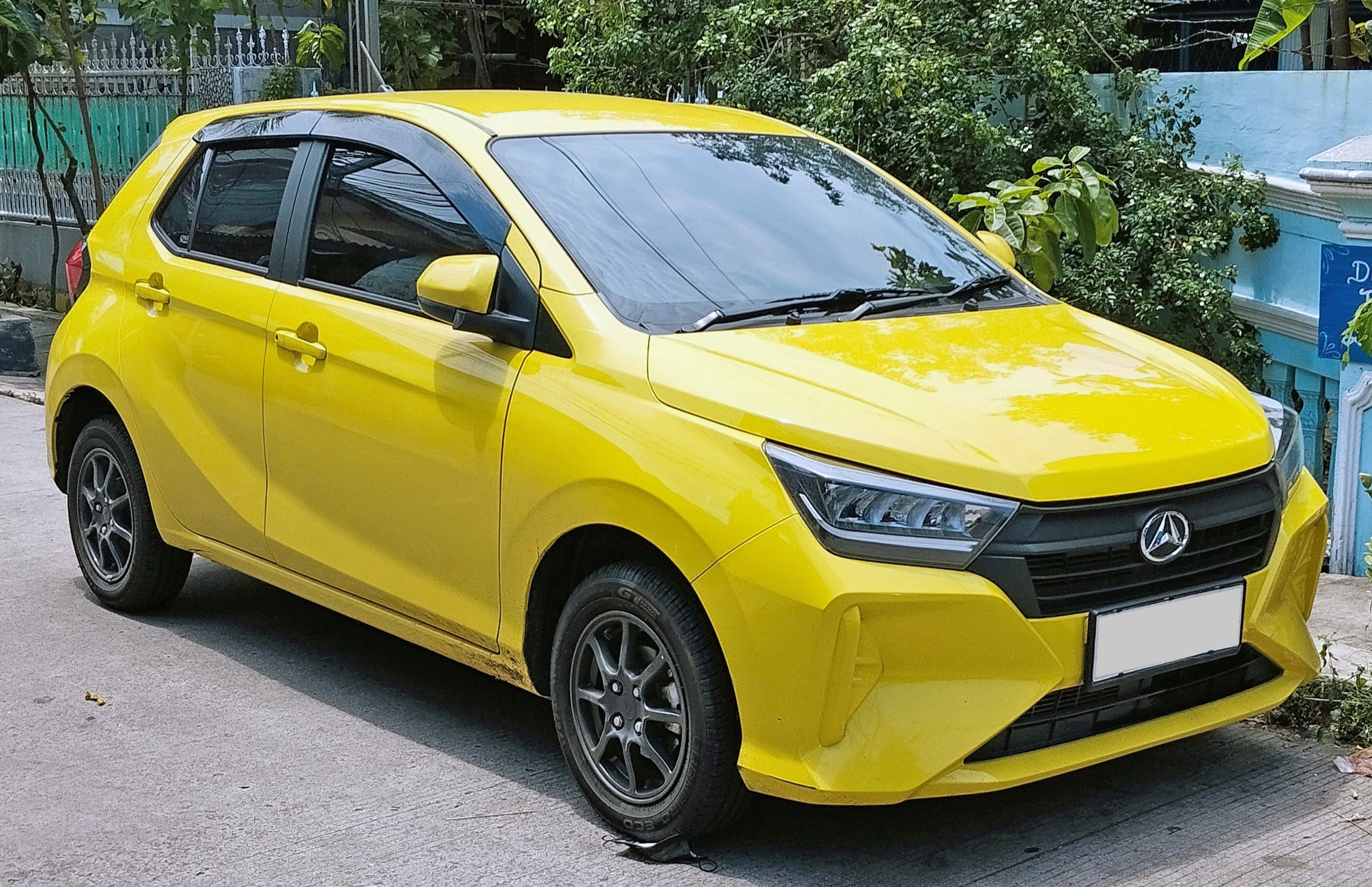
Daihatsu Ayla

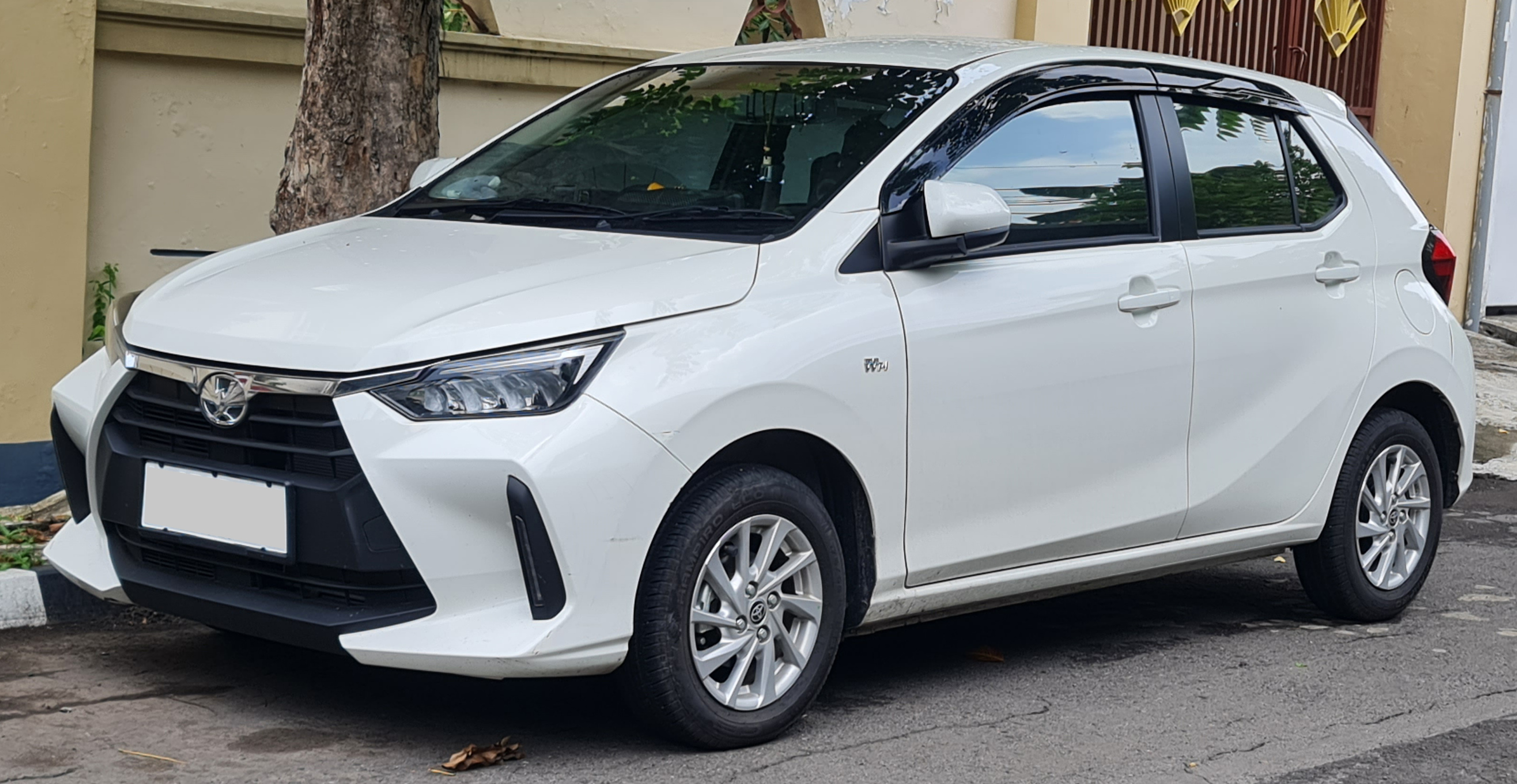
Toyota Agya

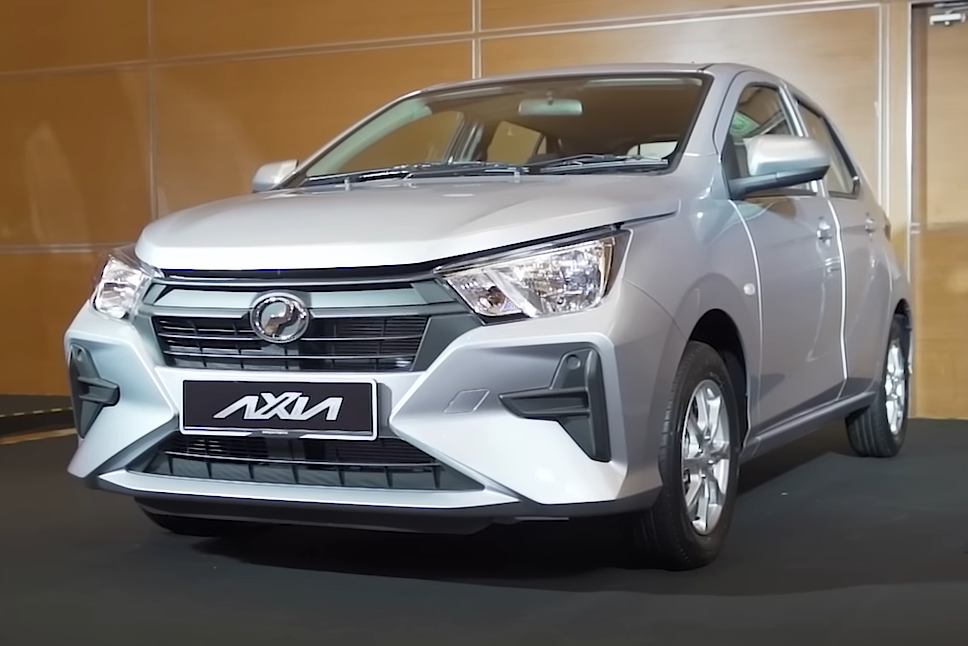
Perodua Axia

=== B-segment (DNGA-B) ===
Vehicles using platform (calendar years):

- Daihatsu Xenia / Toyota Avanza / Toyota Veloz / Perodua Alza — W100/W150 (2021–present)
- Toyota Vios / Yaris Sedan / Yaris Ativ/Vios Ativ — AC100 (2022–present)
- Toyota Yaris Cross / Perodua Traz — AC200 (2023–present)
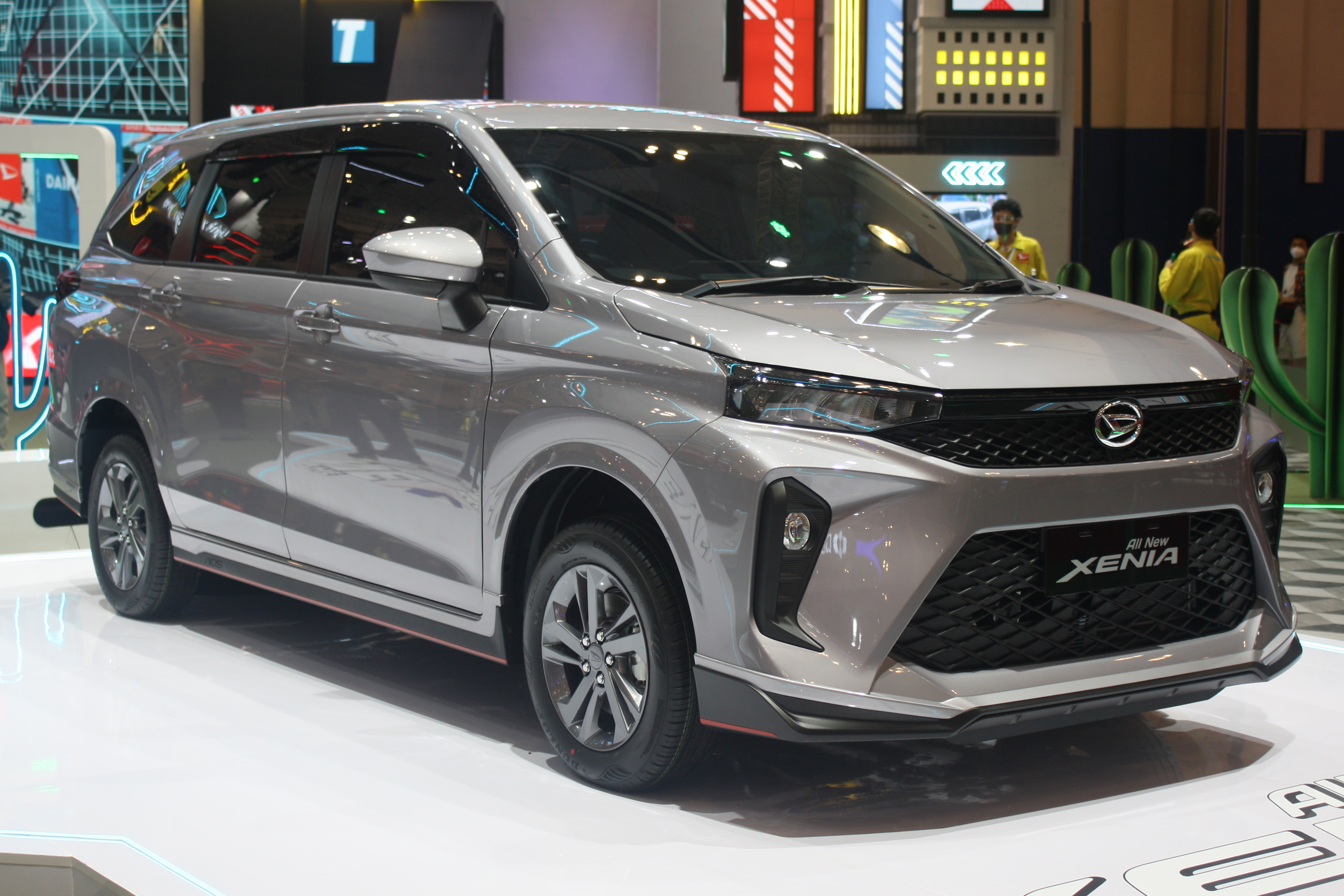
Daihatsu Xenia

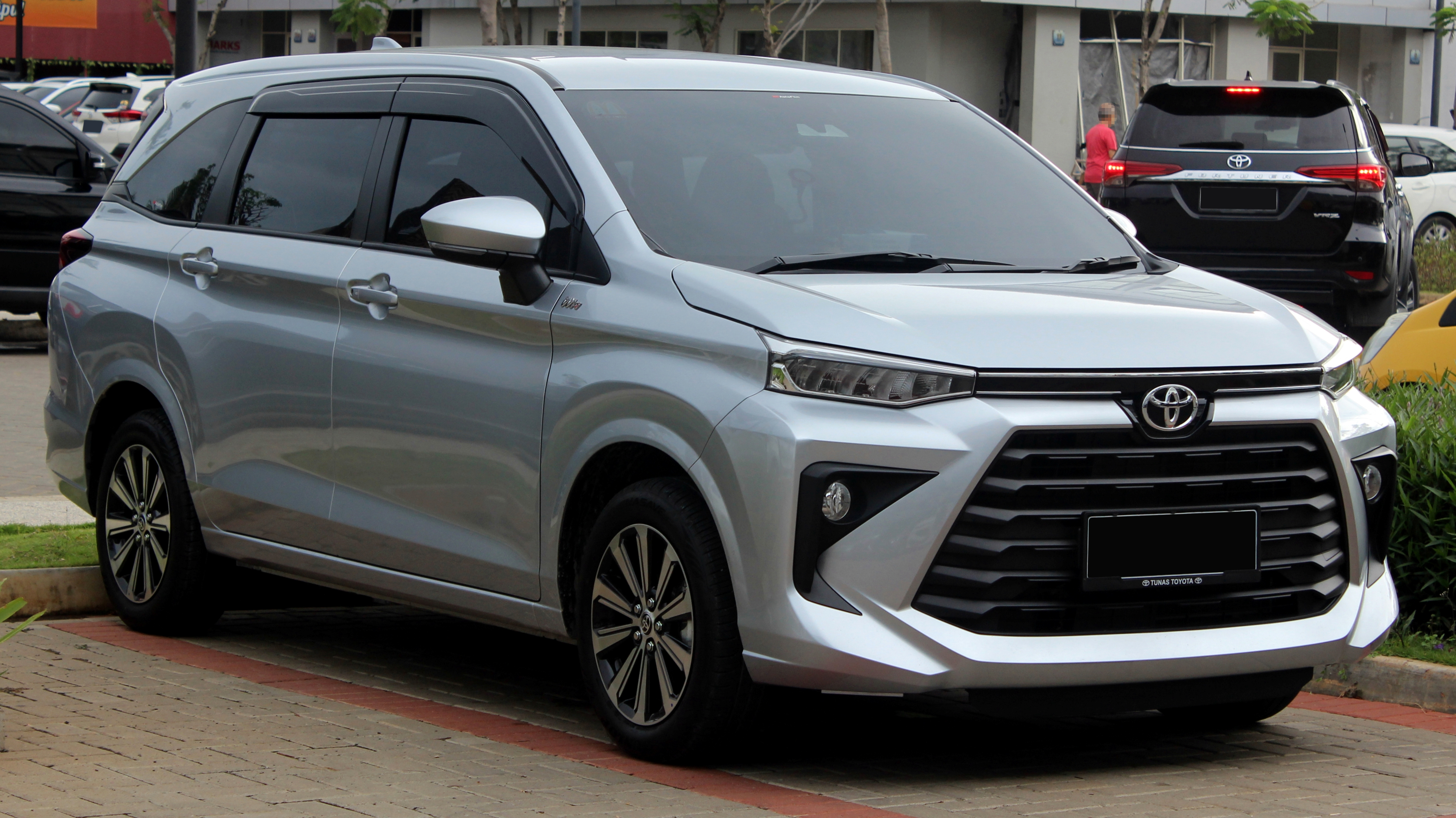
Toyota Avanza/Avanza Premio

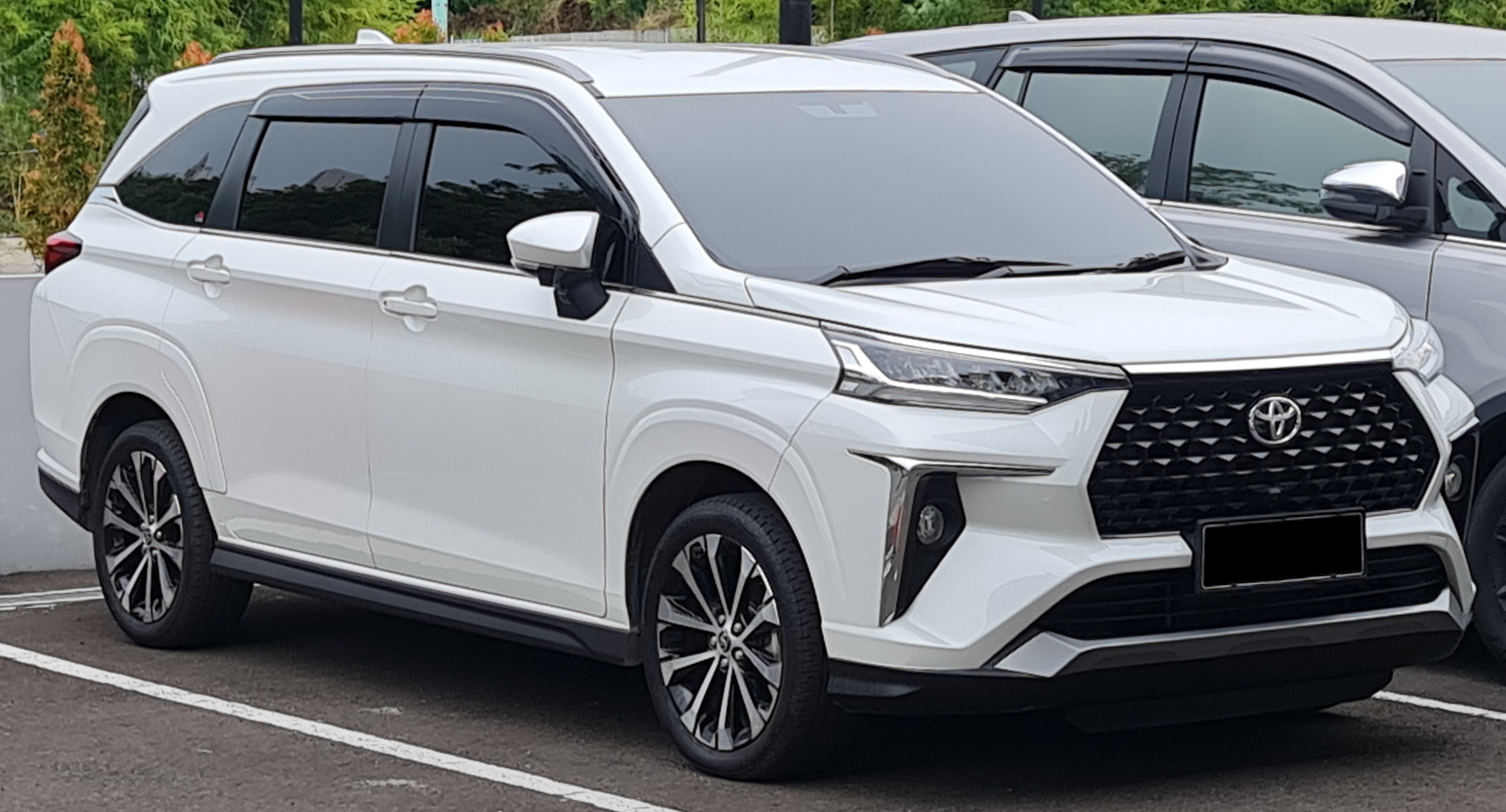
Toyota Veloz/Veloz Cross

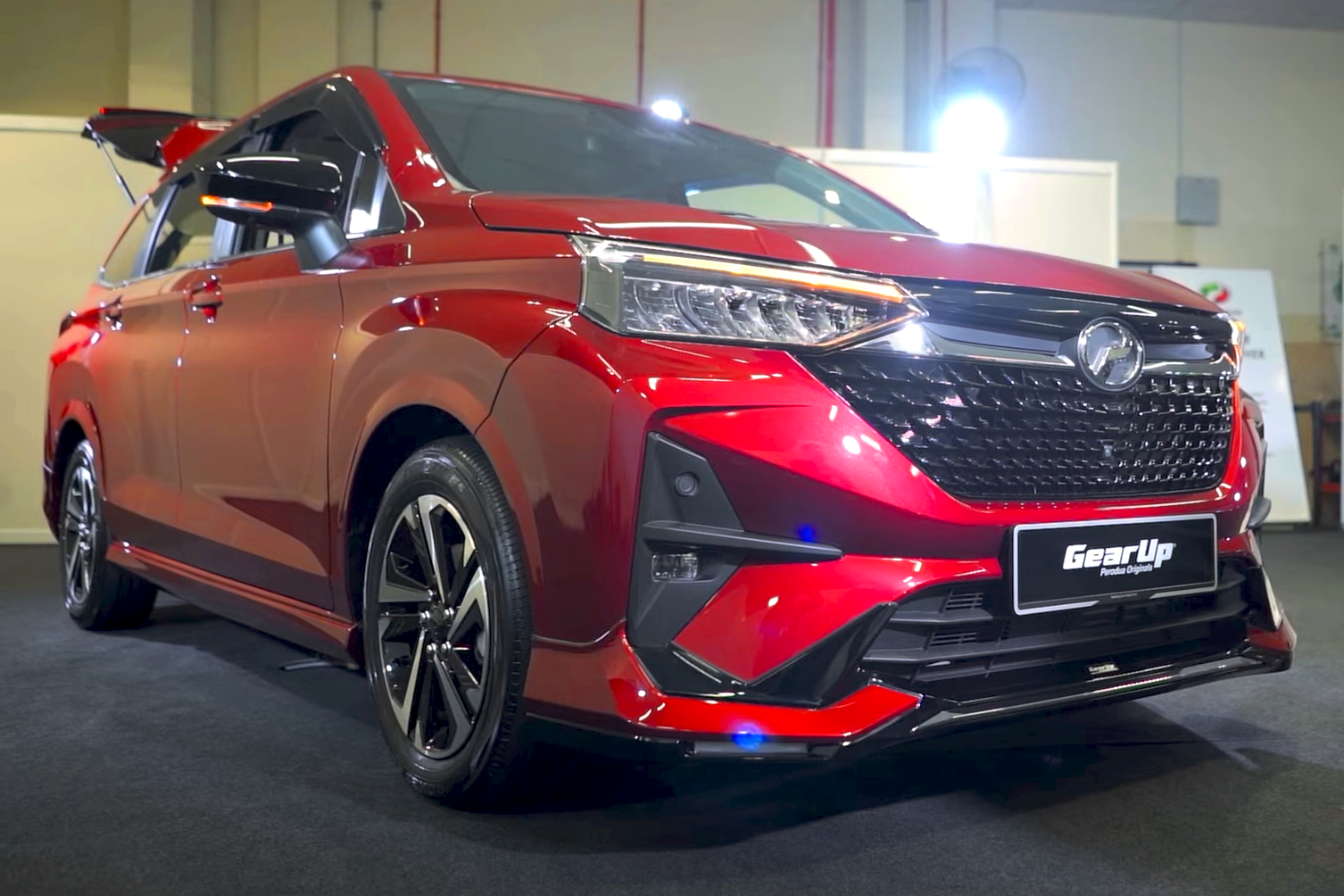
Perodua Alza

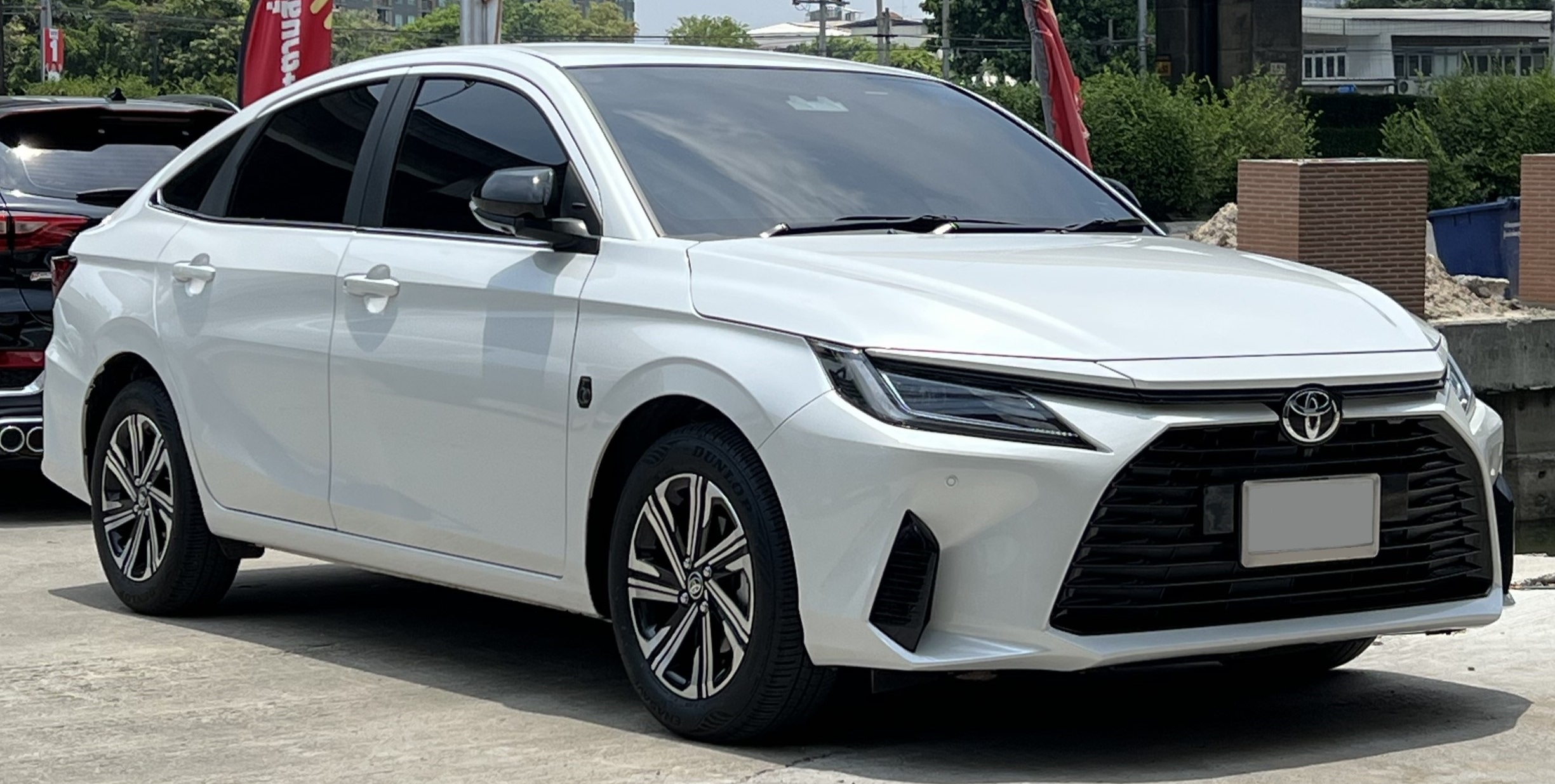
Toyota Vios / Yaris Sedan / Yaris Ativ/Vios Ativ

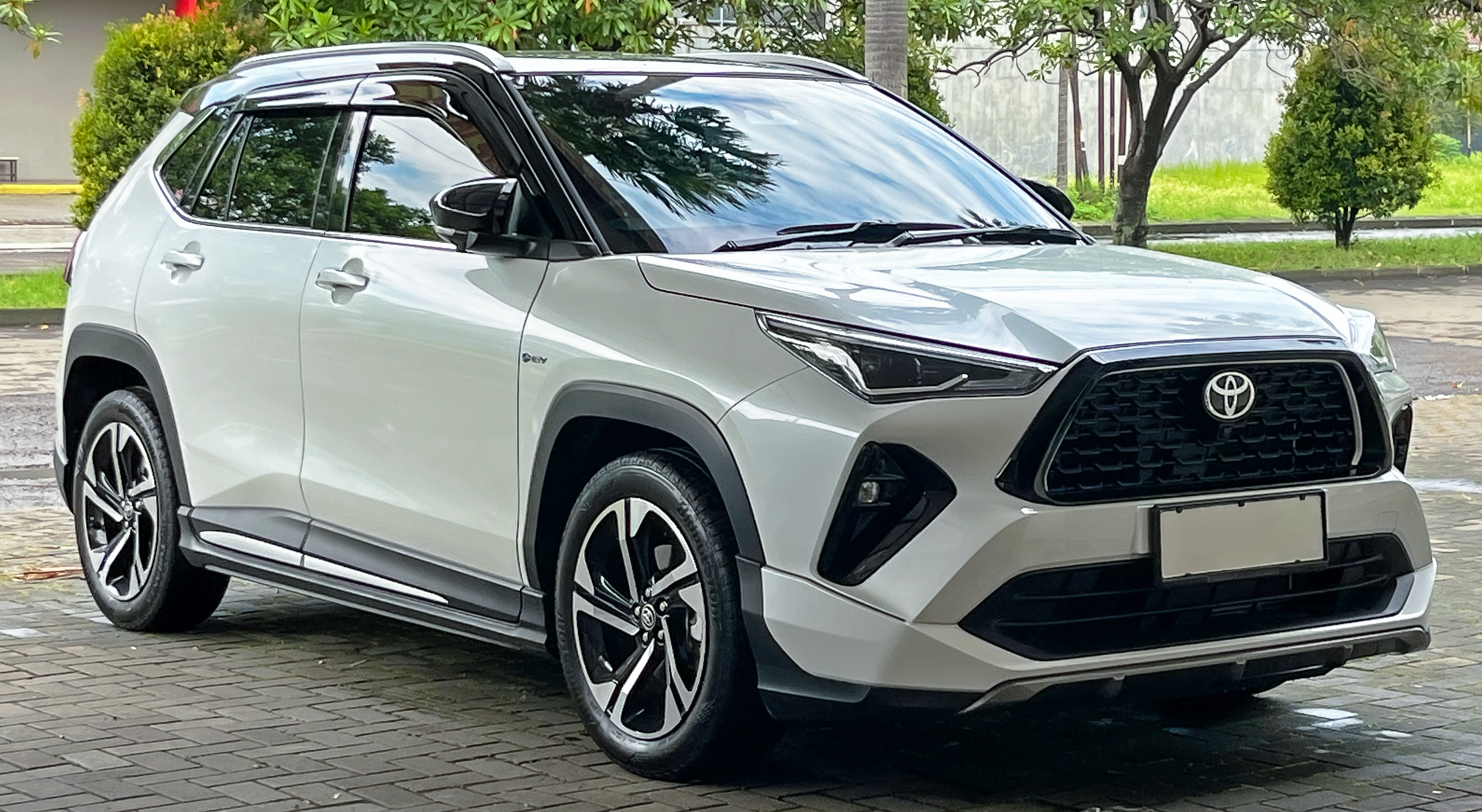
Toyota Yaris Cross

== See also ==
- Toyota New Global Architecture
