= Daihatsu Move Canbus =

Microvan classed as a kei car produced by Daihatsu

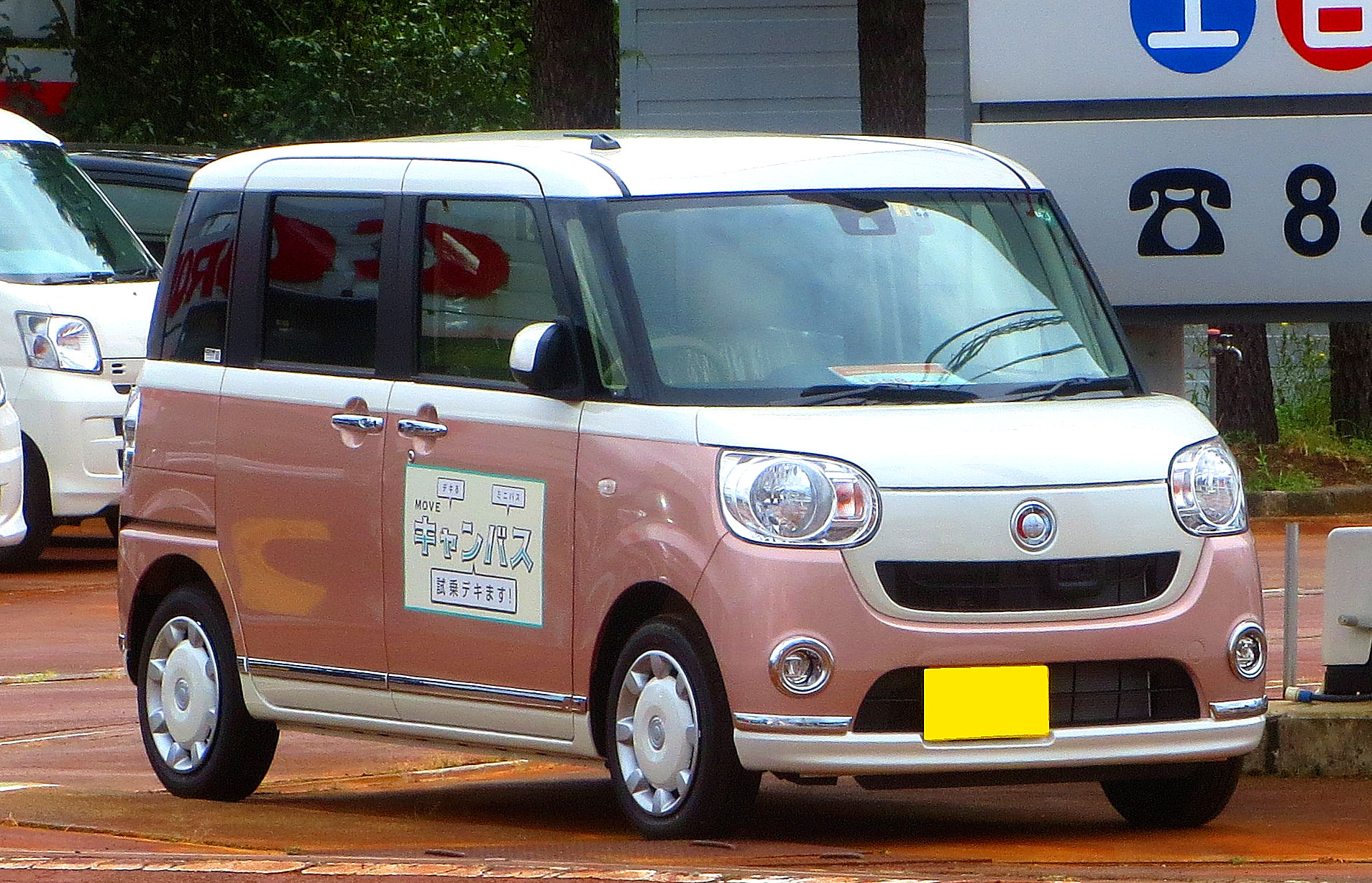
- 2016 Daihatsu Move Canbus X Limited Make Up SA II (LA800S)

Overview
- Manufacturer: Daihatsu
- Production: September 2016 – present

Body and chassis
- Class: Kei car
- Body style: 5-door microvan
- Layout: Front-engine, front-wheel-drive; Front-engine, four-wheel-drive

Chronology
- Predecessor: Daihatsu Move Conte

The Daihatsu Move Canbus (Japanese: ダイハツ・ムーヴキャンバス, Hepburn: Daihatsu Mūvu Kyanbasu) is a retro-styled semi-tall kei car with rear sliding doors manufactured by the Japanese carmaker Daihatsu since 2016. Despite adopting the "Move" nameplate, the car shared its underpinnings with the Tanto instead.

== Etymology ==
The name "Canbus" is a combination of the verb "Can", describing the car's ability, and the noun "Bus", describing the car's bus-like shape and inspiration from the Volkswagen Type 2, which was also known as the "Bus".

== Overview ==
The Move Canbus borrowed its overall design from the Hinata concept car. The Hinata was first showcased at the 2015 Tokyo Motor Show alongside the Tempo food truck and Noriori wheelchair accessible van concepts. It was the third Move derivative, following the Move Latte released in August 2004 and the Move Conte released in August 2008.

The Canbus is targeted towards the female sales demographic.

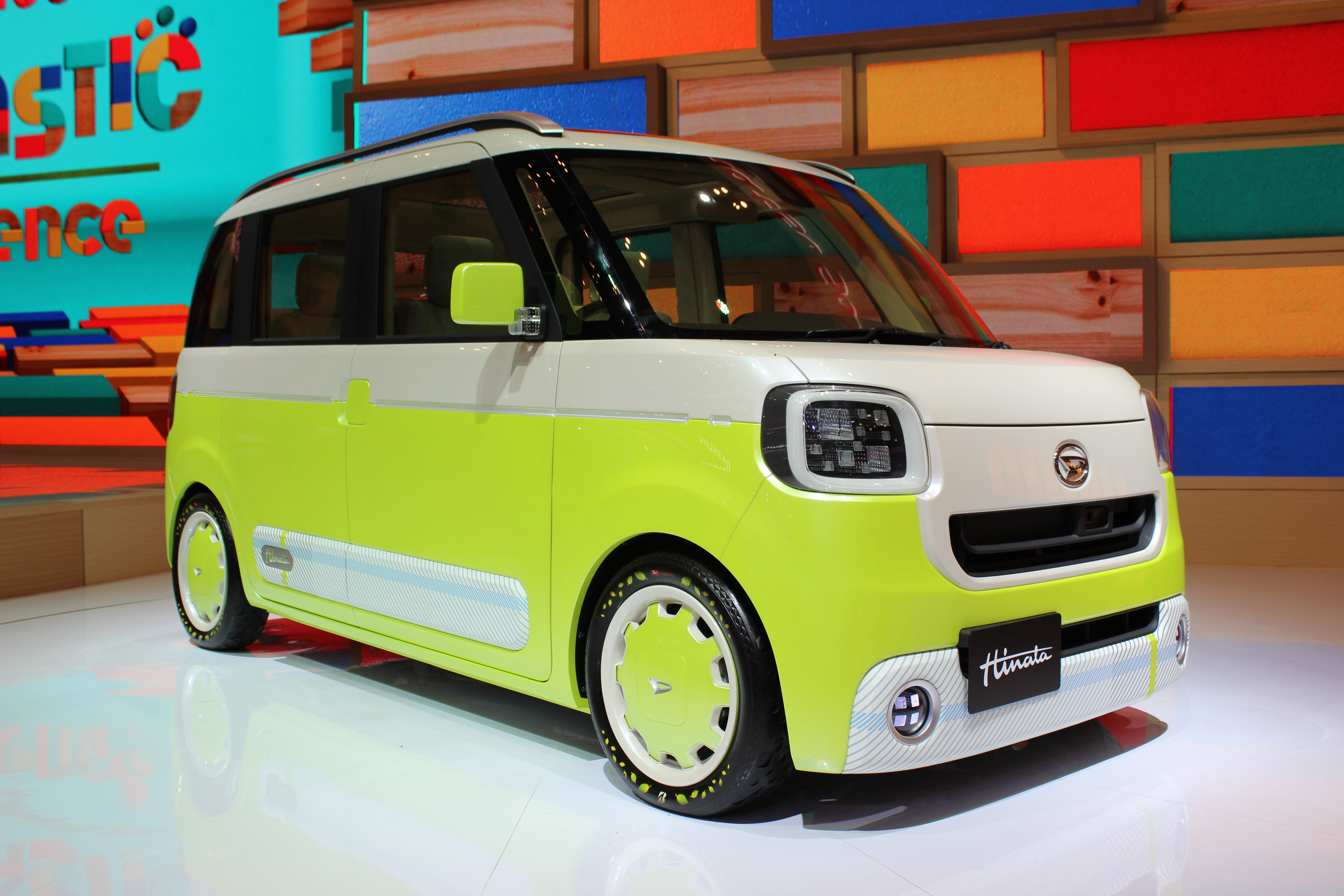
Hinata concept car

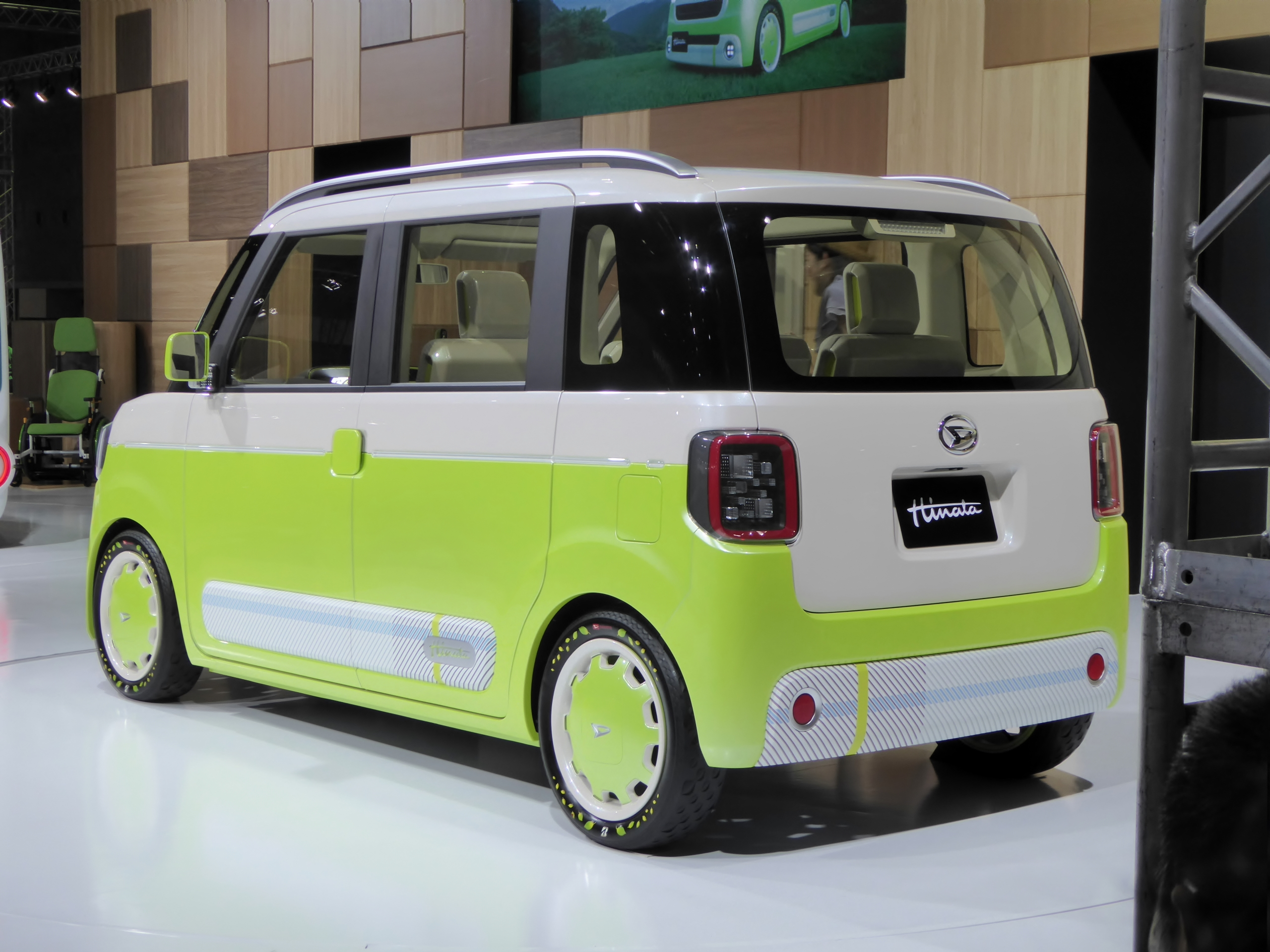
Rear view

== First generation (LA800; 2016) ==
First generation
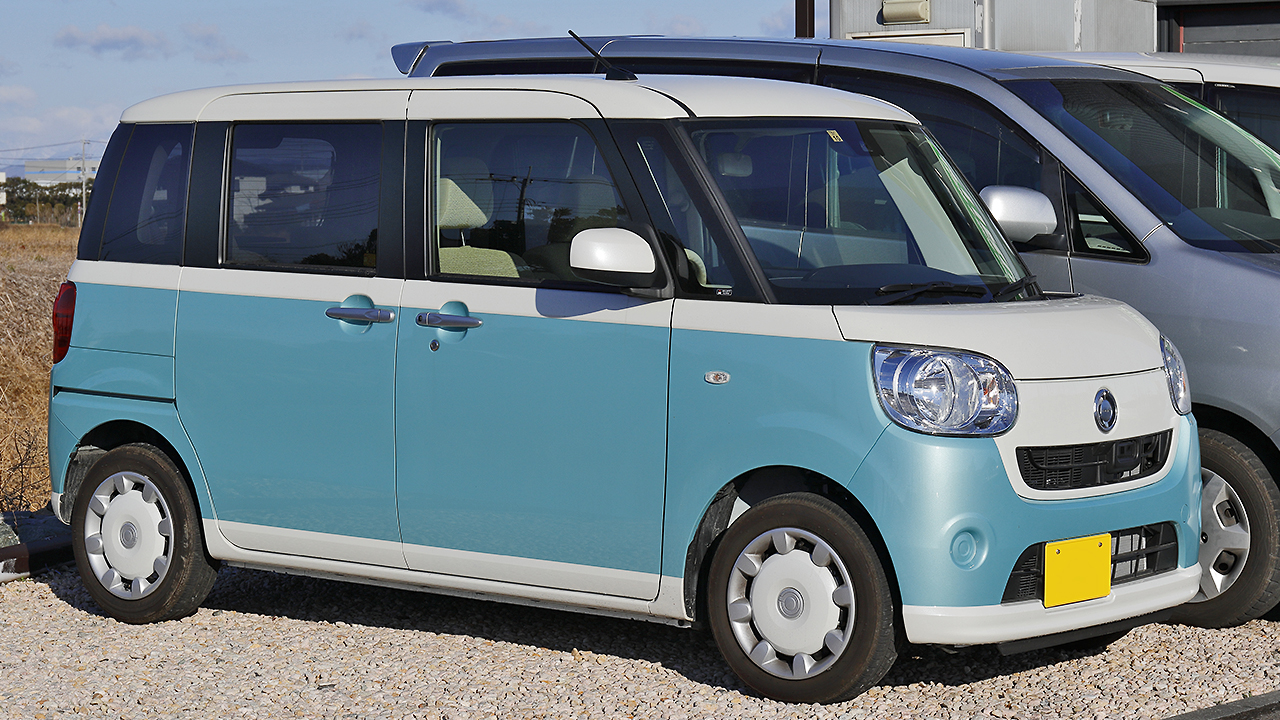
- 2016 Move Canbus X SA II (LA800S)

Overview
- Model code: LA800
- Production: September 2016 – July 2022
- Assembly: Japan: Ōyamazaki, Kyoto (Kyoto plant); Ryūō, Shiga (Ryūō plant)
- Designer: Hideaki Osawa (Chief designer); Nobuhiro Hata

Body and chassis
- Related: Daihatsu Tanto (LA600)

Powertrain
- Engine: Petrol: 658 cc KF-VE I3
- Power output: 38 kW (51 hp; 52 PS)
- Transmission: CVT

Dimensions
- Wheelbase: 2,455 mm (96.7 in)
- Length: 3,395 mm (133.7 in)
- Width: 1,475 mm (58.1 in)
- Height: 1,655 mm (65.2 in)
- Kerb weight: 910–970 kg (2,006–2,138 lb)

The first-generation Move Canbus was sold from 9 September 2016.

The trim levels includes: L, X, and G. All trims are offered with Smart Assist (called the SA II), offered on all trims, while Make Up is available on the X and G trims.

The Move Canbus was introduced as a retro-styled sister model to the Move, despite sharing its underpinnings with the tall-height Tanto. The exterior features a rounded silhouette created by the surface design and a horizontally oriented long cabin.

The Move Canvas stands 1,655 mm (65.2 in) tall, slightly taller than the Move 1,630 mm (64.2 in). Other dimensions, such as length, width, and interior height, are also designed to be larger than the Move but smaller than the Tanto. The Move Canbus fills the gap between the Move and the taller Tanto. The interior features a beige color scheme. Single tone and two-tone colours are available.

The "Makeup" models are offered in X and G "Smart Assist" trims, which includes chrome bumper mouldings and chrome side mouldings, chrome trim on the door handles, and clear crystal rear combination lamps. The interior features chrome trim and interior accent colours.

In February 2018, a Hatsune Miku edition, targeted at female drivers, was introduced at Sapporo Motor Show 2018. Featuring an exclusive mint green colour, redesigned wheels design, and an interior with mint green accents. The Hatsune Miku is designed as an accessory package and is officially sold as an accessory through DBC (Daihatsu Business Support Center).

=== Gallery ===
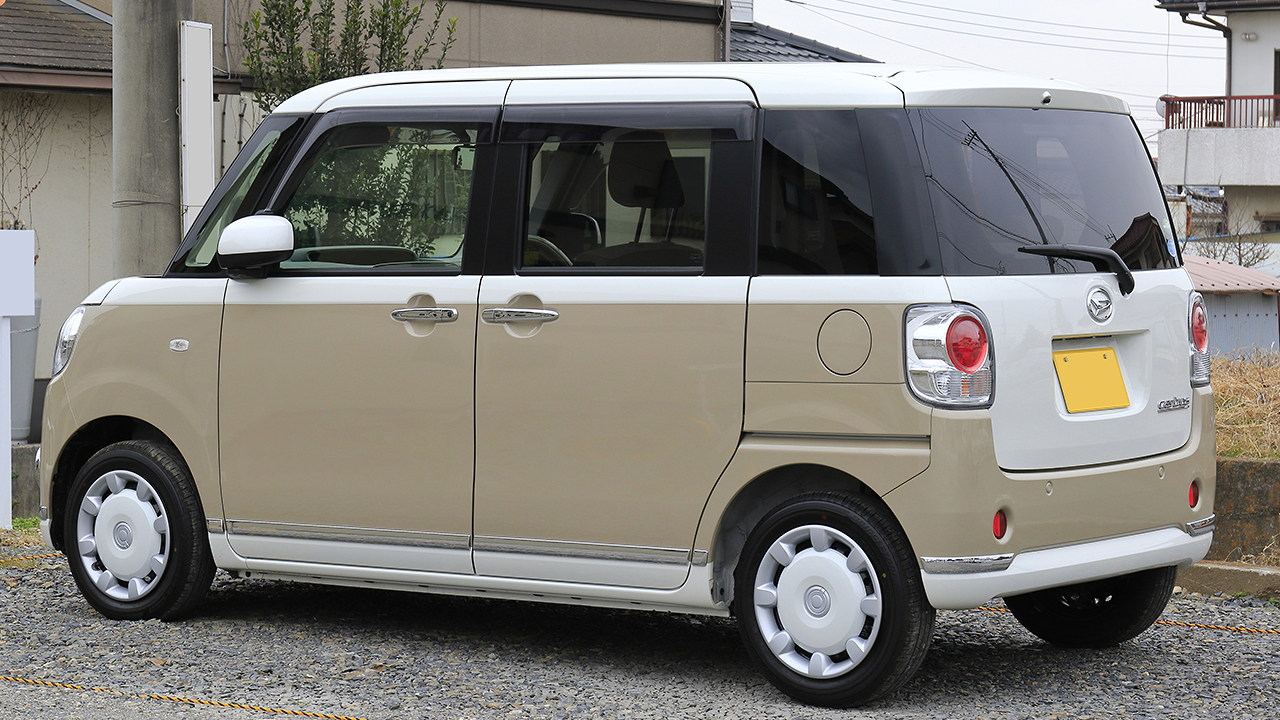
2016 Move Canbus X Make Up SA II (LA800S)

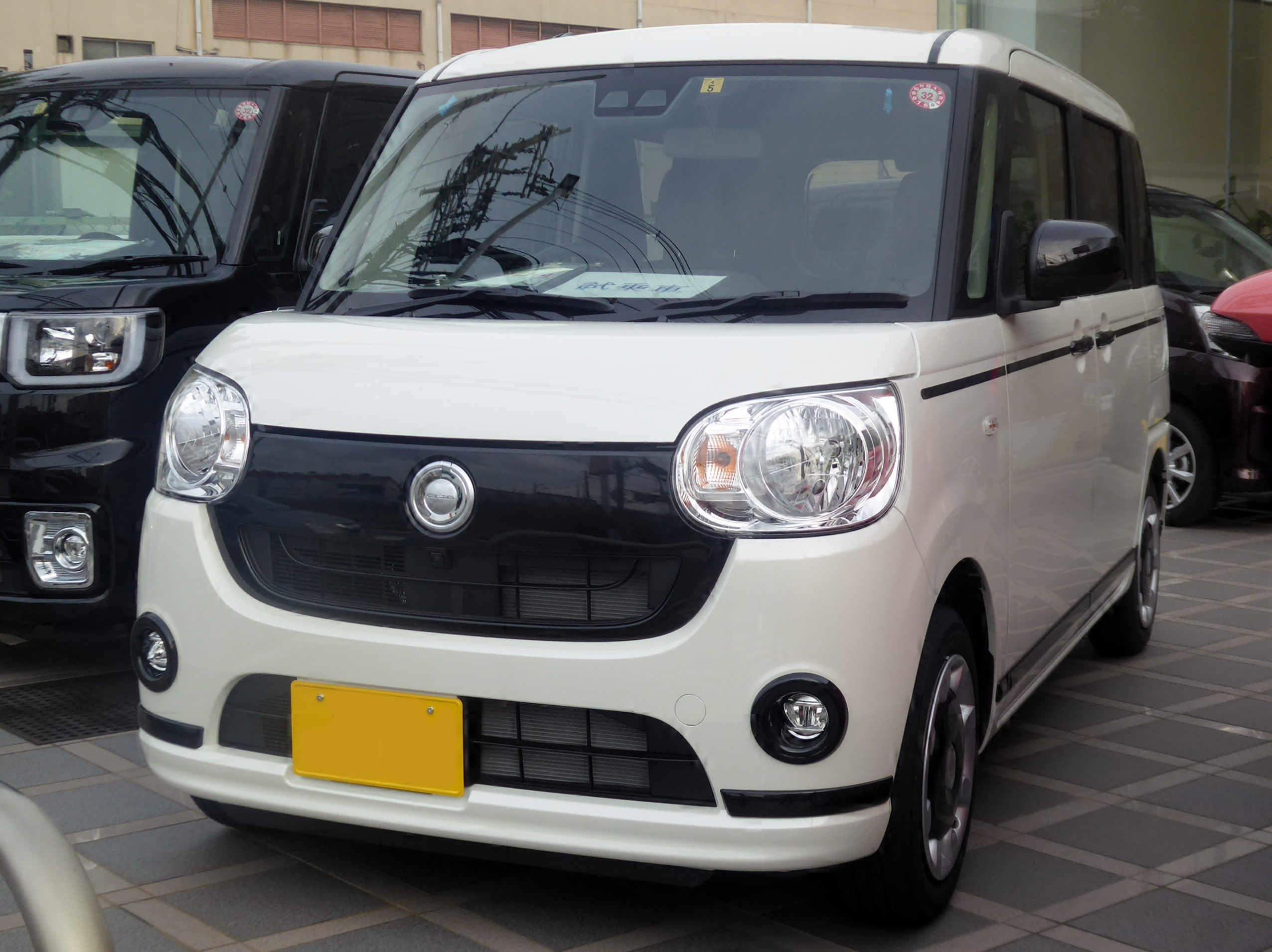
2018 Move Canbus X Black Accent

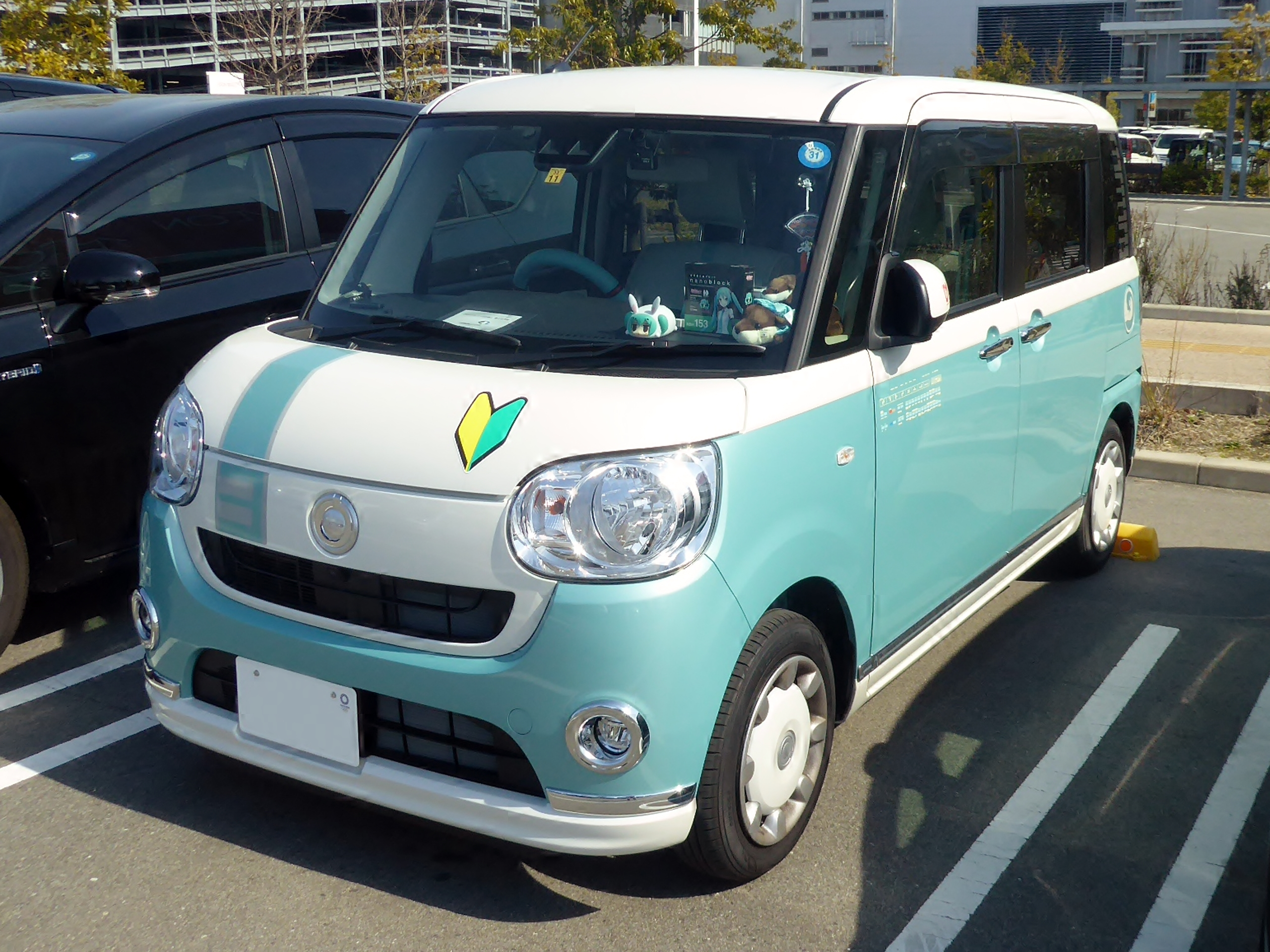
2018 Move Canbus Hatsune Miku edition

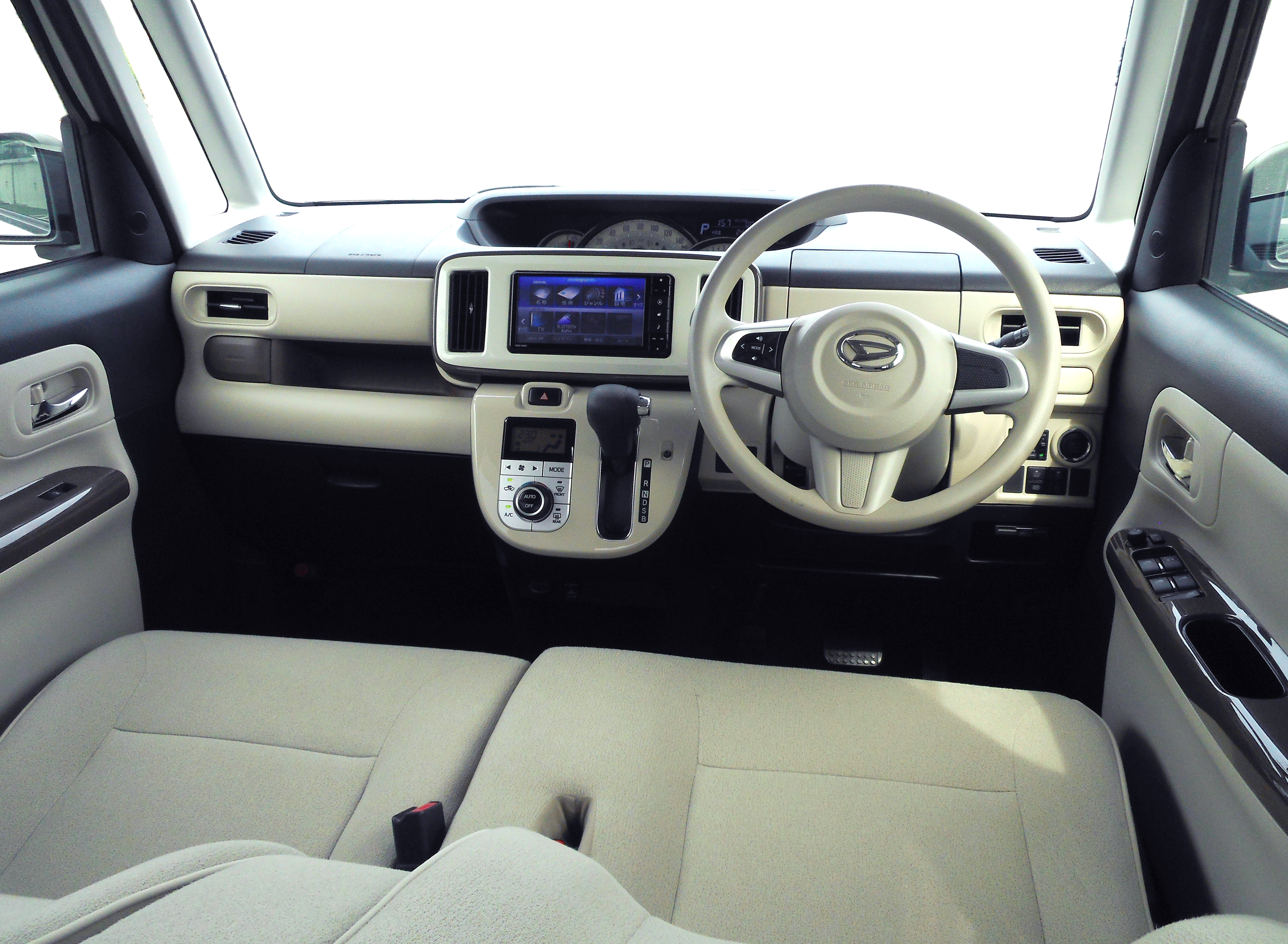
Interior

== Second generation (LA850; 2022) ==
Second generation
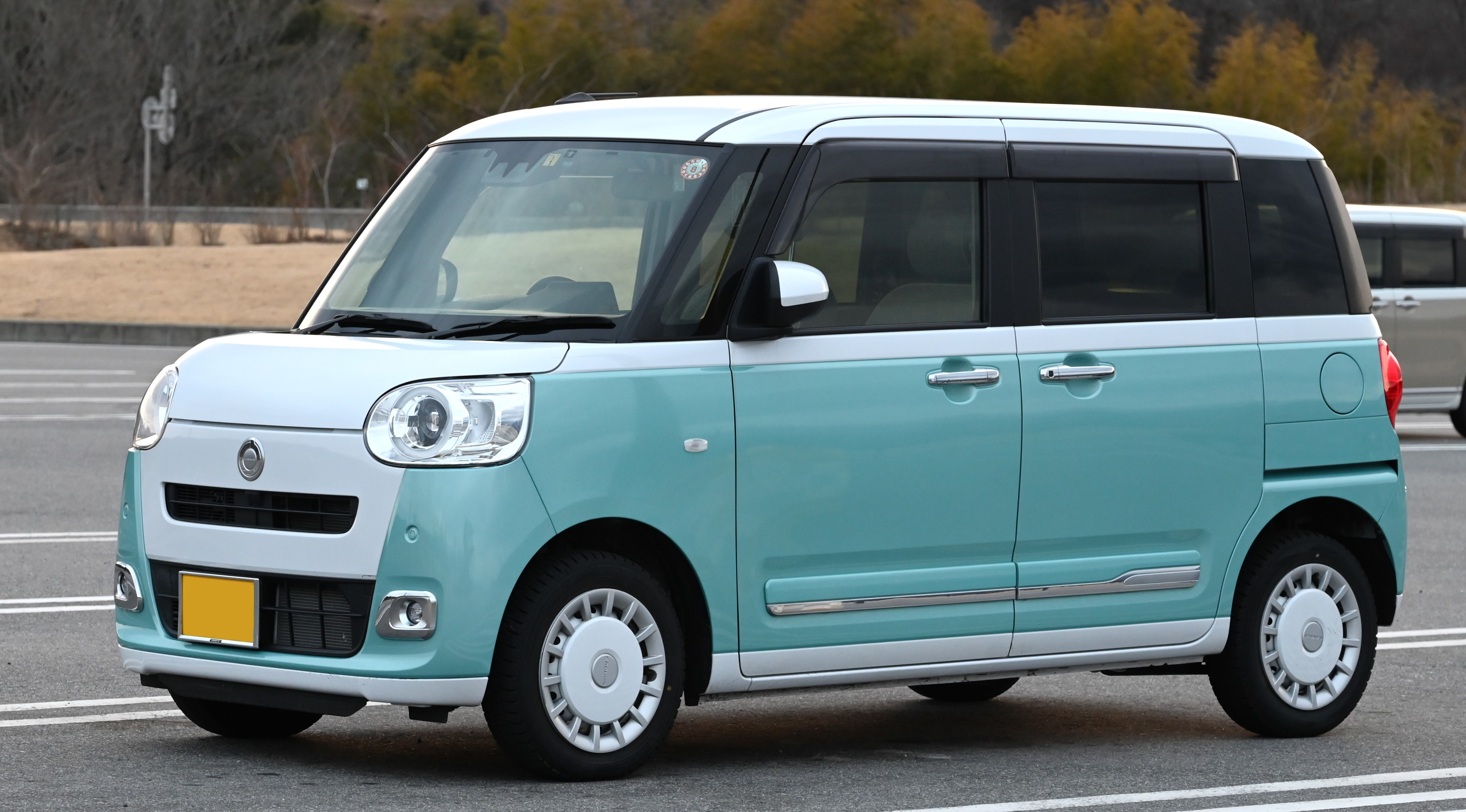
- Move Canbus Stripes G (LA850S)

Overview
- Model code: LA850
- Production: July 2022–present
- Assembly: Japan: Nakatsu, Ōita (Daihatsu Motor Kyushu)
- Designer: Manabu Fukuda and Noriaki Kawai

Body and chassis
- Platform: Daihatsu New Global Architecture (DNGA)
- Related: Daihatsu Tanto (LA650); Daihatsu Taft (LA900)

Powertrain
- Engine: Petrol: 658 cc KF-VE I3; 658 cc KF-DET turbo I3
- Power output: 38 kW (51 hp; 52 PS) (KF-VE); 47 kW (63 hp; 64 PS) (KF-DET)
- Transmission: CVT

Dimensions
- Wheelbase: 2,460 mm (96.9 in)
- Length: 3,395 mm (133.7 in)
- Width: 1,475 mm (58.1 in)
- Height: 1,655–1,675 mm (65.2–65.9 in)
- Kerb weight: 870–950 kg (1,918–2,094 lb)

The second-generation Move Canbus was unveiled on 5 July 2022. Built on the Daihatsu New Global Architecture (DNGA) platform, it is divided into 'Stripes' and 'Theory' sub-models, with the Stripes variants having a white top half & end of the hood, while the Theory variants are purely a single metallic/pearl colour.

In August 2022, The Move Canbus recorded sales of over 26,000 units, far exceeding its initial target.

In December 2023, production of the Canbus was temporarily halted following the Test Fraud Scandal. Production resumed in May 2024.

=== Trims ===
Both of the sub-models of the Move Canbus are divided into trim levels.

The trim levels range from (lowest to highest):

- X
- G
- G Turbo

=== Safety ===
The Move Canbus is equipped with Smart Assist as an option. It features a 'Stereo Camera', which recognizes the surrounding situation & supports the driver's driving. The Stereo Camera is fitted with a start suppression device which immobilizes the car depending on the surrounding situation, which has been certified by the Ministry of Land, Infrastructure, Transport & Tourism.

The Move Canbus is also fitted with an emergency stop signal, & 6 SRS Airbags as standard, including Dual Frontal SRS Airbags, Dual SRS Side Airbags, & SRS Curtain Airbags. The G Turbo trim is fitted with Cornering Trace Assist, which is optional on the G trim. Cornering Trace Assist detects if the vehicle is bulging outward during a turn, then applies brake control to the inner wheels to improve turning performance & assist cornering. The Move Canbus is fitted with ESC, ABS & Frontal Seat Belt Pretensioners fitted with Load Limiters as standard.

=== Gallery ===
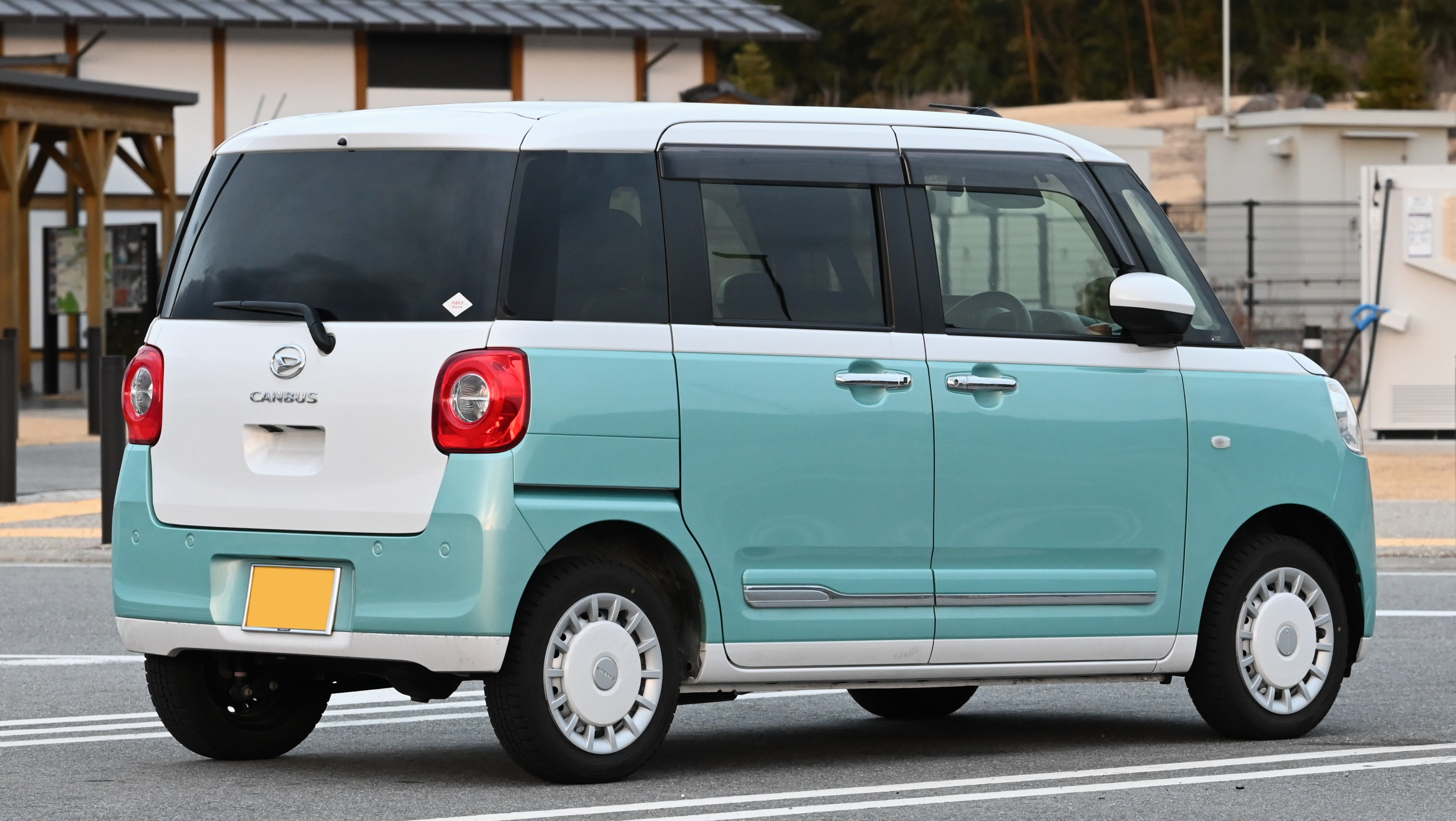
Rear view (Stripes G)

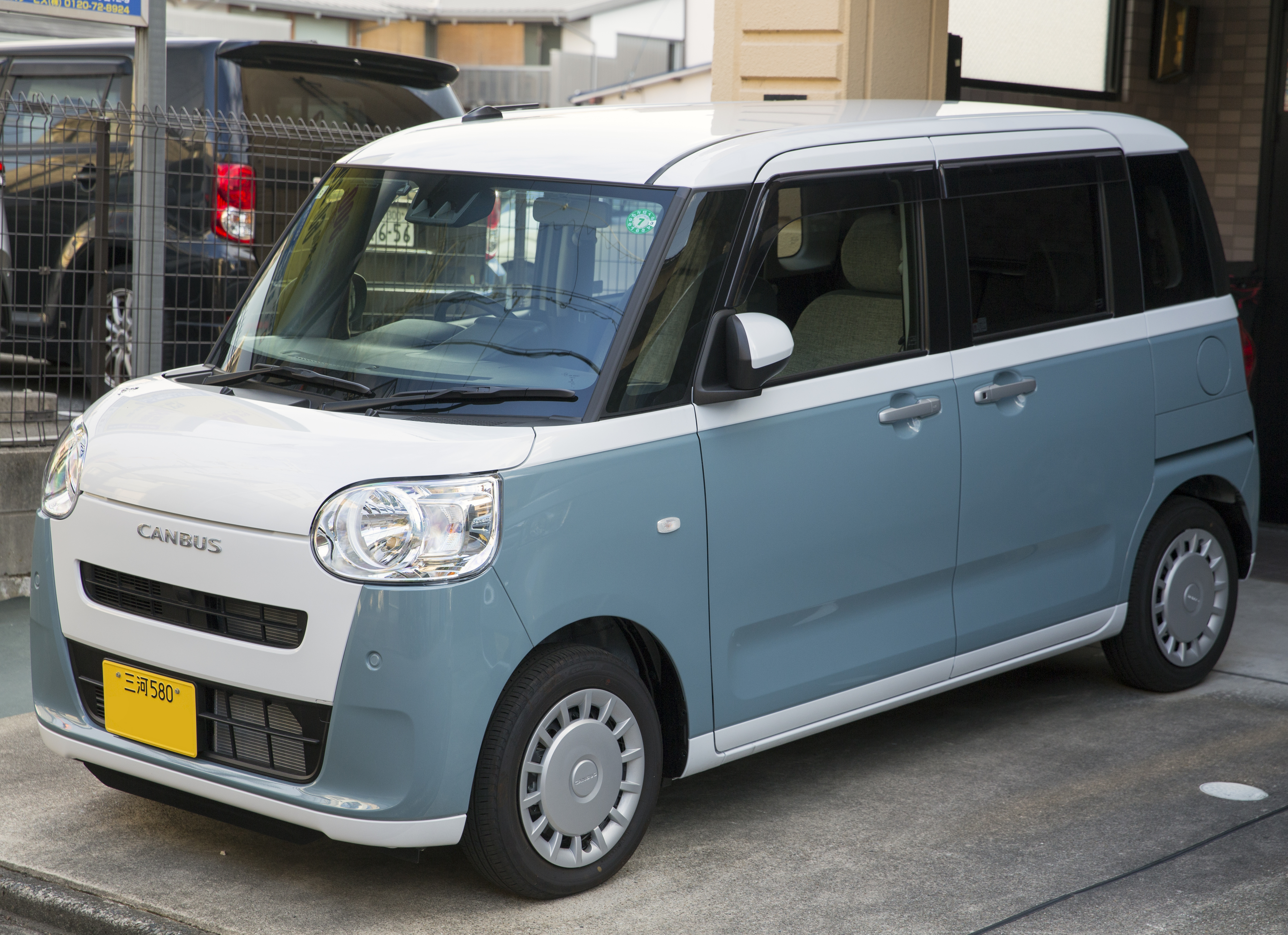
The Stripes X is the lowest-priced version and features almost no chrome

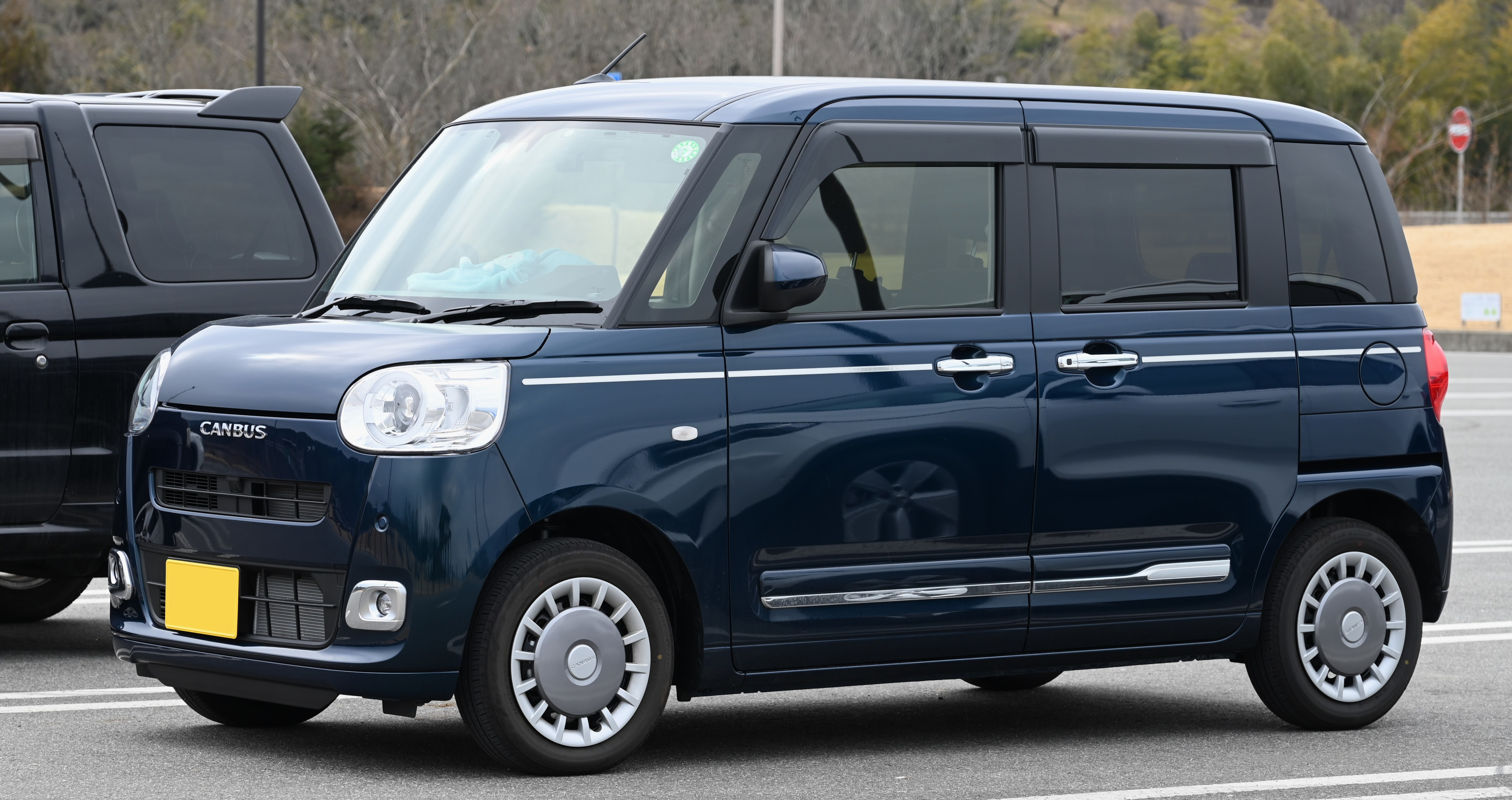
The Move Canbus Theory G is single-color, with a more "masculine" design approach

== Sales ==
In July 2022, Daihatsu set a sales target at 6,500 units for the Move Canbus, at the time of transitioning from the first to second generation. The Move Canbus managed to exceed the target in 2023, but Daihatsu's enforced four-month production halt after a December 2023 safety test scandal meant numbers were down considerably for 2024.

Year	Japan
2016	29,053
2017	76,732
2018	74,326
2019	68,487
2020	57,183
2021	58,342
2022	55,835
2023	83,440
2024	41,989
