= Naked (disambiguation) =

Naked refers to the state of nudity.

Naked may also refer to:

== Film and television ==
- Naked (1993 film), a British film directed by Mike Leigh
- Naked (2002 film), a German comedy directed by Doris Dörrie
- Naked (2013 film), an American musical directed by Sean Robinson
- Naked (2017 film), an American comedy directed by Michael Tiddes
- "Naked" (Coupling), a 2001 television episode
- "Naked" (Glee), a 2013 television episode
- "Naked" (New Girl), a 2011 television episode

== Literature ==
- Naked (book), a 1997 essay collection by David Sedaris
- Naked, a 2009 autobiography by Anneke Wills

== Music ==
- Naked Records, a 1990s British record label founded by members of Curiosity Killed the Cat

=== Bands ===
- The Naked, a 1989–1999 Danish indie-rock band

=== Albums ===
- Naked (Amber album), 2002
- Naked (Art Ensemble of Chicago album), 1986
- Naked (Blue Pearl album), 1990
- Naked (Chanmina album), 2023
- Naked (Joan Jett album) or the title song, 2004
- Naked (Kissing the Pink album), 1983
- Naked (Louise album) or the title song (see below), 1996
- Naked (Marques Houston album) or the title song (see below), 2005
- Naked (Soulhead album), 2006
- Naked (Talking Heads album), 1988
- Naked (Zheng Jun album), 1994
- Naked, by Andy Griggs, 2013
- Naked, by Doug Pinnick, 2013
- Naked, by Kang In-soo, 2017
- Naked, by Sex Gang Children, 1982
- Naked, by Sowelu, 2008
- Naked, an EP by Reona, 2022

=== Songs ===
- "Naked" (Ava Max song), 2020
- "Naked" (Dev and Enrique Iglesias song), 2011
- "Naked" (Falco song), 1996
- "Naked" (Goo Goo Dolls song), 1996
- "Naked" (James Arthur song), 2017
- "Naked" (Kevin McCall song), 2012
- "Naked" (Louise song), 1996
- "Naked" (Marques Houston song), 2005
- "Naked" (Tiësto song), an alternative version of "Wasted", 2014
- "Naked"/"Fight Together"/"Tempest", by Namie Amuro, 2011
- "Naked", by Above & Beyond from Common Ground, 2018
- "Naked", by Avril Lavigne from Let Go, 2002
- "Naked", by Baby Alice, 2016
- "Naked", by Brymo from Klĭtôrĭs, 2016
- "Naked", by Celine Dion from One Heart, 2003
- "Naked", by Christopher from Closer (2017 reissue), 2017
- "Naked", by Damiano David from Funny Little Fears (Dreams), 2025
- "Naked", by DNCE from DNCE, 2016
- "Naked", by Doja Cat from Planet Her, 2021
- "Naked", by Ella Mai from Ella Mai, 2018
- "Naked", by Finneas O'Connell, 2022
- "Naked", by Jason Derulo, 2016
- "Naked", by Jonas Blue and Max Schneider, 2020
- "Naked", by Ken Carson from More Chaos, 2025
- "Naked", by Leona Lewis from Echo, 2009
- "Naked", by Lizzo from Special, 2022
- "Naked", by Mikuni Shimokawa, 2000
- "Naked", by Miley Cyrus from Plastic Hearts, 2020
- "Naked", by Popcaan from Forever, 2018
- "Naked", by Reef from Replenish, 1995
- "Naked", by the Spice Girls from Spice, 1996
- "Naked", by Taeyang from White Night, 2017
- "Naked", by Tracy Bonham from Blink the Brightest, 2005
- "Naked", by Travis Scott from Owl Pharaoh, 2013
- "Naked", by X Ambassadors from VHS, 2015
- "Naked", by Yeat from ADL, 2026

== Other uses ==
- Daihatsu Naked, an automobile
- Naked bike, a class of motorcycles
- Naked cuticle (Nkd), a family of proteins
- Naked Juice, a brand of fruit drinks

== See also ==
- Nude (disambiguation)
