= Naked Gun (disambiguation) =

The Naked Gun is a media franchise based on the 1980s parody TV show Police Squad!

Naked Gun may also refer to:

- The Naked Gun: From the Files of Police Squad!, a 1988 comedy film
- The Naked Gun (2025 film), a reboot sequel film, the 4th film in the film series
- Naked Gun (1956 film), an unrelated 1956 western film

== See also ==
- All pages with titles containing "naked" and "gun"
- naked (disambiguation)
- gun (disambiguation)
