= Nudie =

Nudie may refer to:

- Nudie Jeans
- Nudie Juice, Australian juice producer
- Helen Barbara Kruger, fashion designer also known as Bobbie Nudie
- Nudie Cohn, fashion designer born as Nuta Kotlyarenko

== See also ==
- Nude (disambiguation)
