= Zheng Jun =

Chinese singer

- Born: 6 November 1967 (age 58)
- Origin: Xi'an, Shaanxi, China
- Genres: Alternative Rock
- Instrument: Vocals
- Years active: 1994–present
- Spouse: Liu Yun (m. 2010)

Zheng Jun
- Simplified Chinese: 郑钧
- Traditional Chinese: 鄭鈞
Transcriptions
Standard Mandarin
- Hanyu Pinyin: Zhèng Jūn

Zheng Jun (Chinese: 郑钧; born 6 November 1967) is a Chinese rock singer-songwriter. Originally from Xi'an, he attended Hangzhou Institute of Electrical Engineering (renamed Hangzhou Dianzi University). His first album, Naked (赤裸裸), was released by Red Star Productions in 1994, achieving immediate success. He went on to release Third Eye three years later and Bloom two years after that.

Zheng Jun won the MTV International Viewer's Choice Award for his song "1/3 Dream" in 2002, and is only one of two music artists from China to have received the international MTV award; the other being Cui Jian for "Wild in the Snow" in 1991.

Asides from his own compositions, Zheng Jun has recorded a Chinese language version of Coldplay's song "Yellow", entitled "流星" ("shooting star," pinyin: Liú Xīng), which was included in the soundtrack of the 2001 Taiwanese television series Meteor Garden I and the 2018 film Crazy Rich Asians. He has since released three albums entitled Zhengjun=zj, Our Life Is Full of Sunshine and Chang An Chang An.

In 2007, Zheng joined the judges' panel of Happy Boys Voice, a sequel to Hunan Satellite Television's Super Girl; a controversy developed over his quarrel with fellow judge Yang Erche Namu over her ranking of a contestant from his hometown of Xi'an.

In 2016, Chinese-American 3D animated feature film Rock Dog was released in China on 8 July by distributor Huayi Brothers. The film is based on Zheng's manga Tibetan Rock Dog. Zheng also serves as one of the producers on the film.

== Discography ==
=== Studio albums ===
Year	Title
1994	Naked
1997	Third Eye
1999	Bloom
2001	Zhengjun=zj
2003	Our Life Is Full of Sunshine
2007	Chang An Chang An

=== Live albums ===
Year	Title
2001	Accidental = JZ
2005	Industrial Society Concert Beijing

== Filmography ==
=== Variety and reality show ===
Year	English title	Notes
2022	Call Me by Fire	Season 2
