= Nudes =

Nudes may refer to:

- Nude (art), an art form revolving around nudity
- Nude photography, a form of photography revolving around nudity
- Dick pic, a photograph or image of the male penis sent electronically

== Clothing ==
- Skin or flesh coloured pantyhose, mostly used in films or modeling

== Music ==
- Nudes, a 2002 album by Nathan Moor as part of the folk rock band The Amusement (stylized "ThaMuseMeant")

== Literature ==
- Nudes, a 2017 book by David Lynch
- Nudes, a 2021 book by Elle Nash

== Television ==
- Nudes, an upcoming American science comedy television series
- Nudes, a 2018–present French television series by Arnaud Figaret

== See also ==
- Nudity
- Nude (disambiguation)
