= Daihatsu Taft (LA900) =

Crossover SUV classed as a kei car produced by Daihatsu

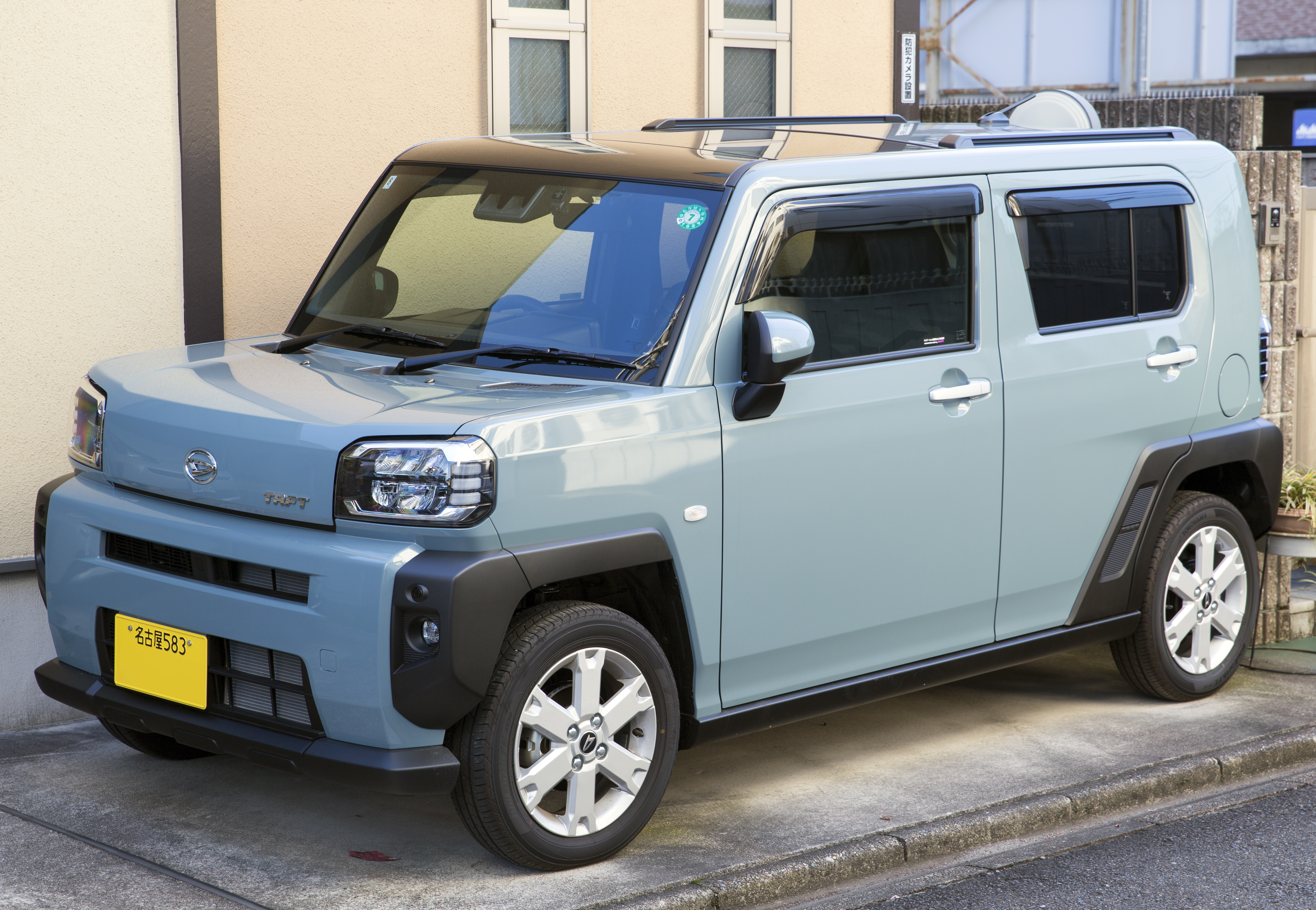
- Daihatsu Taft G (LA900S)

Overview
- Manufacturer: Daihatsu
- Model code: LA900
- Production: June 2020 – present
- Assembly: Japan: Nakatsu, Ōita (Daihatsu Motor Kyushu)
- Designer: Tomoyoshi Yoneyama and Toshio Shibagaki

Body and chassis
- Class: Kei car
- Body style: 5-door hatchback
- Layout: Front-engine, front-wheel-drive; Front-engine, four-wheel-drive
- Platform: Daihatsu New Global Architecture (DNGA)
- Related: Daihatsu Tanto (LA650); Daihatsu Move Canbus (LA850)

Powertrain
- Engine: Petrol: 658 cc KF-VE I3; 658 cc KF-DET turbo I3
- Power output: 38 kW (52 PS; 51 hp) (KF-VE); 47 kW (64 PS; 63 hp) (KF-DET)
- Transmission: CVT

Dimensions
- Wheelbase: 2,460 mm (96.9 in)
- Length: 3,395 mm (133.7 in)
- Width: 1,475 mm (58.1 in)
- Height: 1,630 mm (64.2 in)
- Kerb weight: 830–840 kg (1,830–1,852 lb) (FWD); 880–890 kg (1,940–1,962 lb) (4WD)

Chronology
- Predecessor: Daihatsu Cast Activa/Sport; Daihatsu Naked; Daihatsu Terios Kid

The LA900 series Daihatsu Taft (Japanese: ダイハツ・タフト, Hepburn: Daihatsu Tafuto) is a crossover SUV-styled kei car produced by Japanese automaker Daihatsu. It is built on Daihatsu New Global Architecture (DNGA) platform and replaced the Cast Activa and Sport. It was first introduced at the 2020 Tokyo Auto Salon in January 2020 as a prototype vehicle and went on sale on 10 June 2020.

== Etymology ==
The "Taft" nameplate was revived in 2020 after last being used on the Indonesian market F70 series Taft offroader in 2007. The name was also originally used on the F10 series Taft.

For the LA900 model, the name Taft is an acronym for Tough & Almighty Fun Tool.

== Overview ==
The Production Version was first unveiled at 2020 Tokyo Auto Salon. The 2020 prototype similar to concept model such as the squared headlights. The exterior features a square body, based on a horizontal design with a thick body, thin cabin, and thick center pillar. The headlights and taillights are also square in shape. An optional called chrome pack and a dark chrome pack consisting of two garnishes (hood and tailgate), were available as dealer options. The Sky Feel Top available for all grade. Feature a large glass panel above the front seats.

The Taft is available in three grades: the X and G grades, both equipped with a naturally aspirated inline 3-cylinder engine, and the G Turbo, which features a 3-cylinder turbo engine. The KF-VE engine from most of Daihatsu's kei car range and produces 52 PS (38 kW; 51 bhp) and 61 N⋅m (45 lb⋅ft) and turbocharge model produces 64 PS (47 kW; 63 bhp) and 100 N⋅m (74 lb⋅ft).

The Taft features a platform based on DNGA and a lightweight, high-rigidity body called D Monocoque. The car features a minimum ground clearance of 190 mm. The transmission is the company's unique D-CVT, which adds a split gear for turbo models, all grades are paired with a CVT transmission, considering weight and cost.

A new grade called the Rugged Venture and Active Mode in July 2026. Booth models are based on the G and G Turbo grades. Both models share exterior features such as colored door mirrors and door outer handles in black mica metallic, and chrome trim on the rear combination lamps.

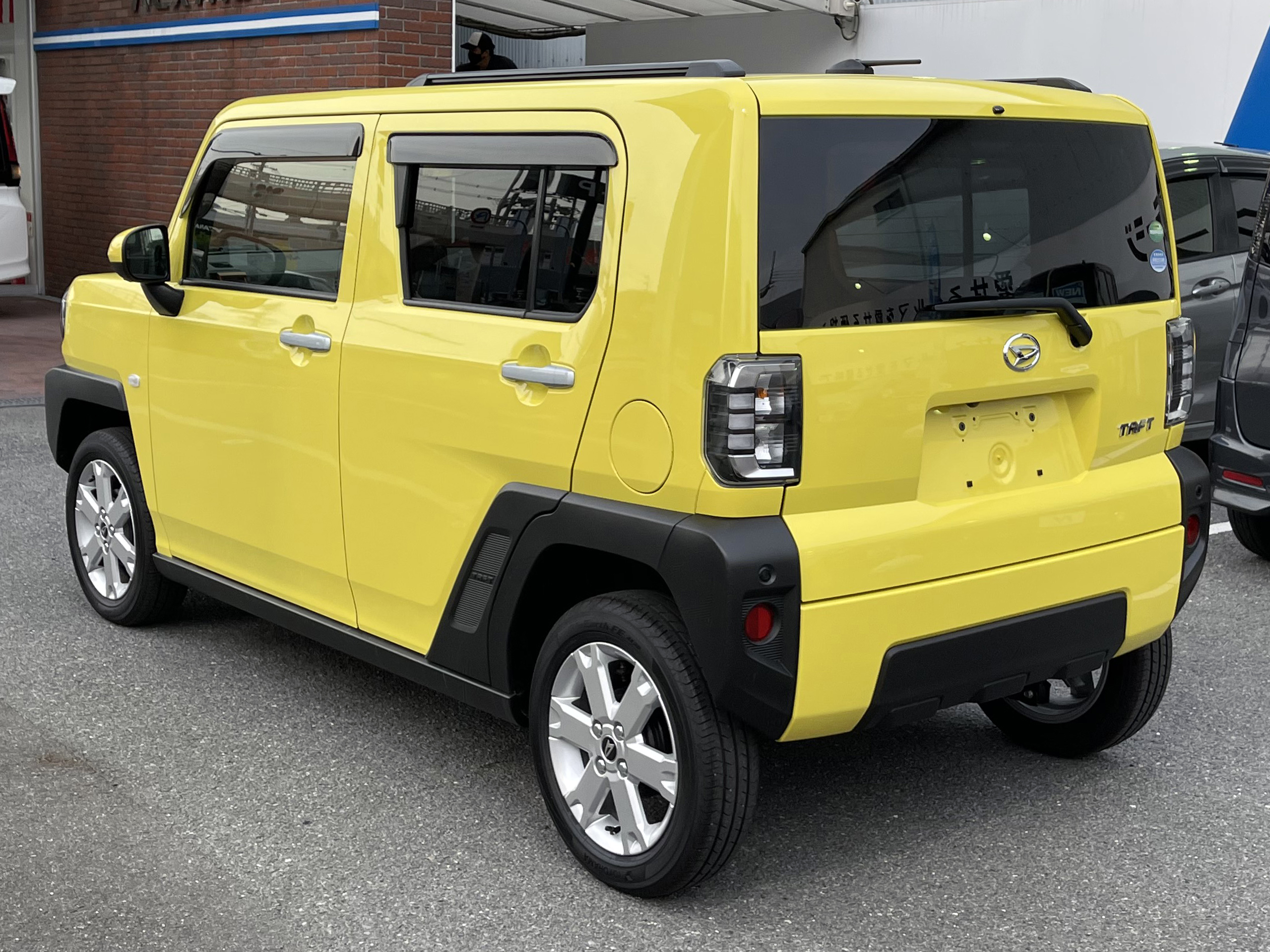
2021 Taft G (LA900S)

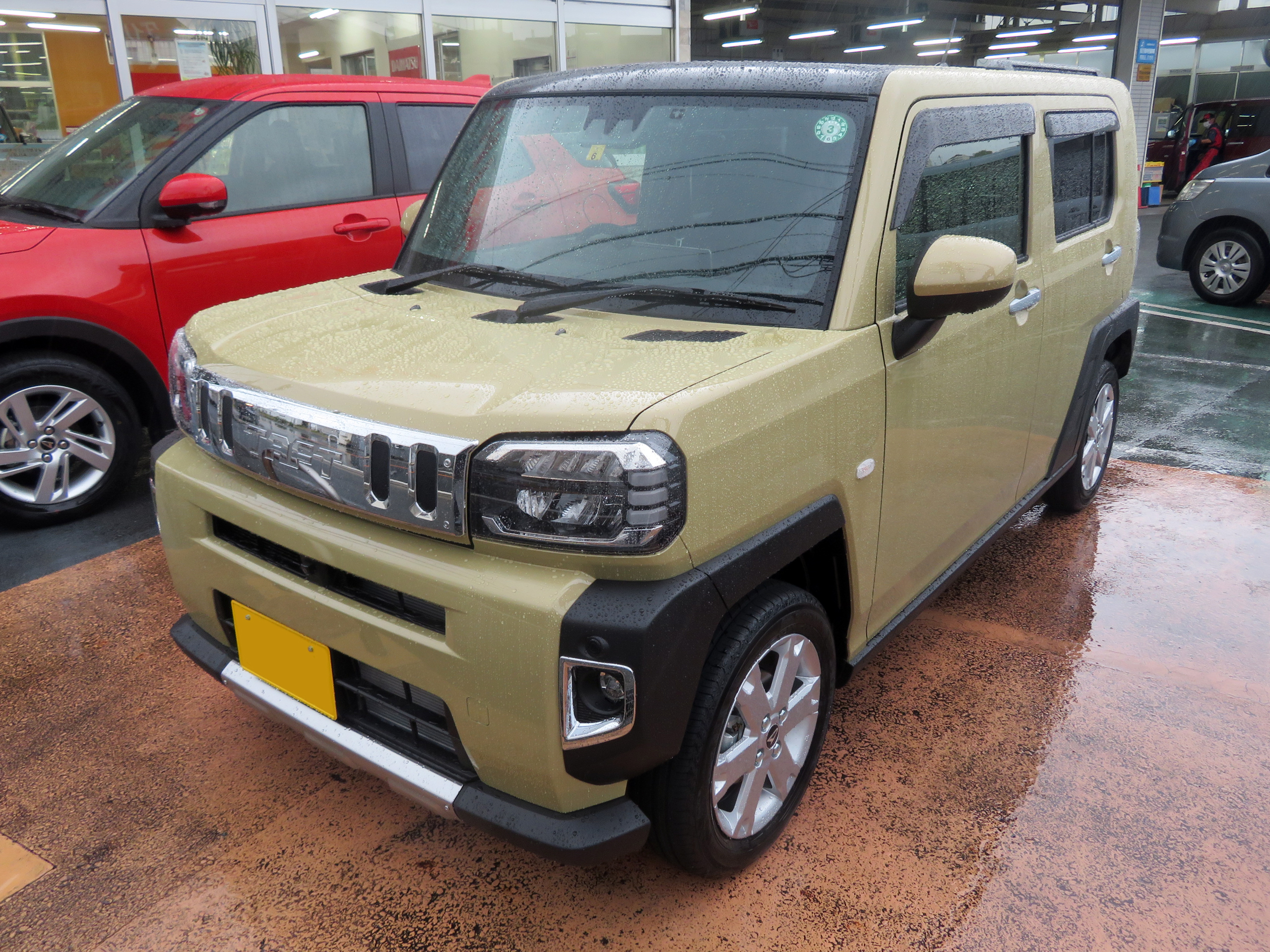
2020 Taft G with Chrome plating package (LA900S)

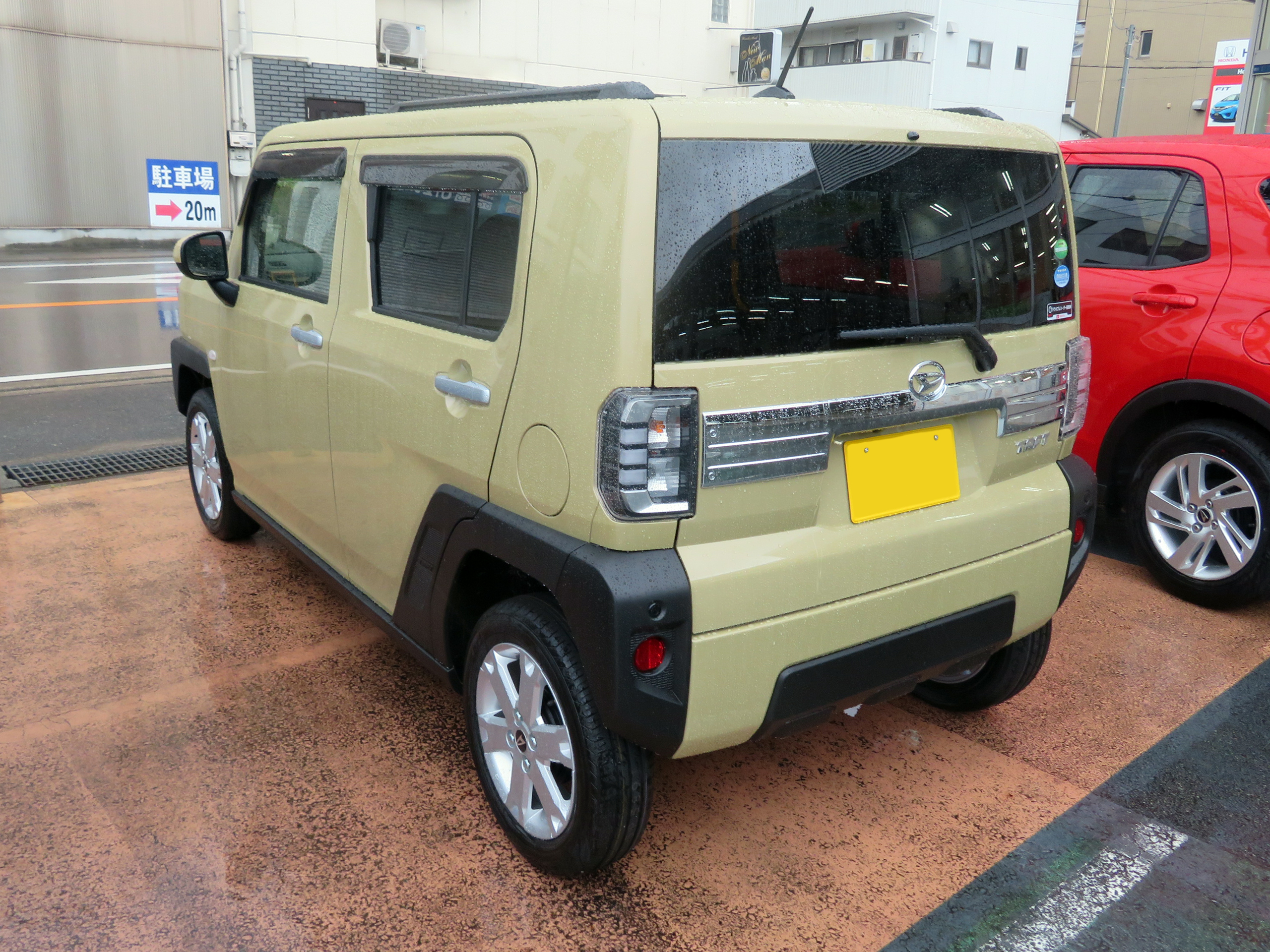
2020 Taft G with Chrome plating package (LA900S)

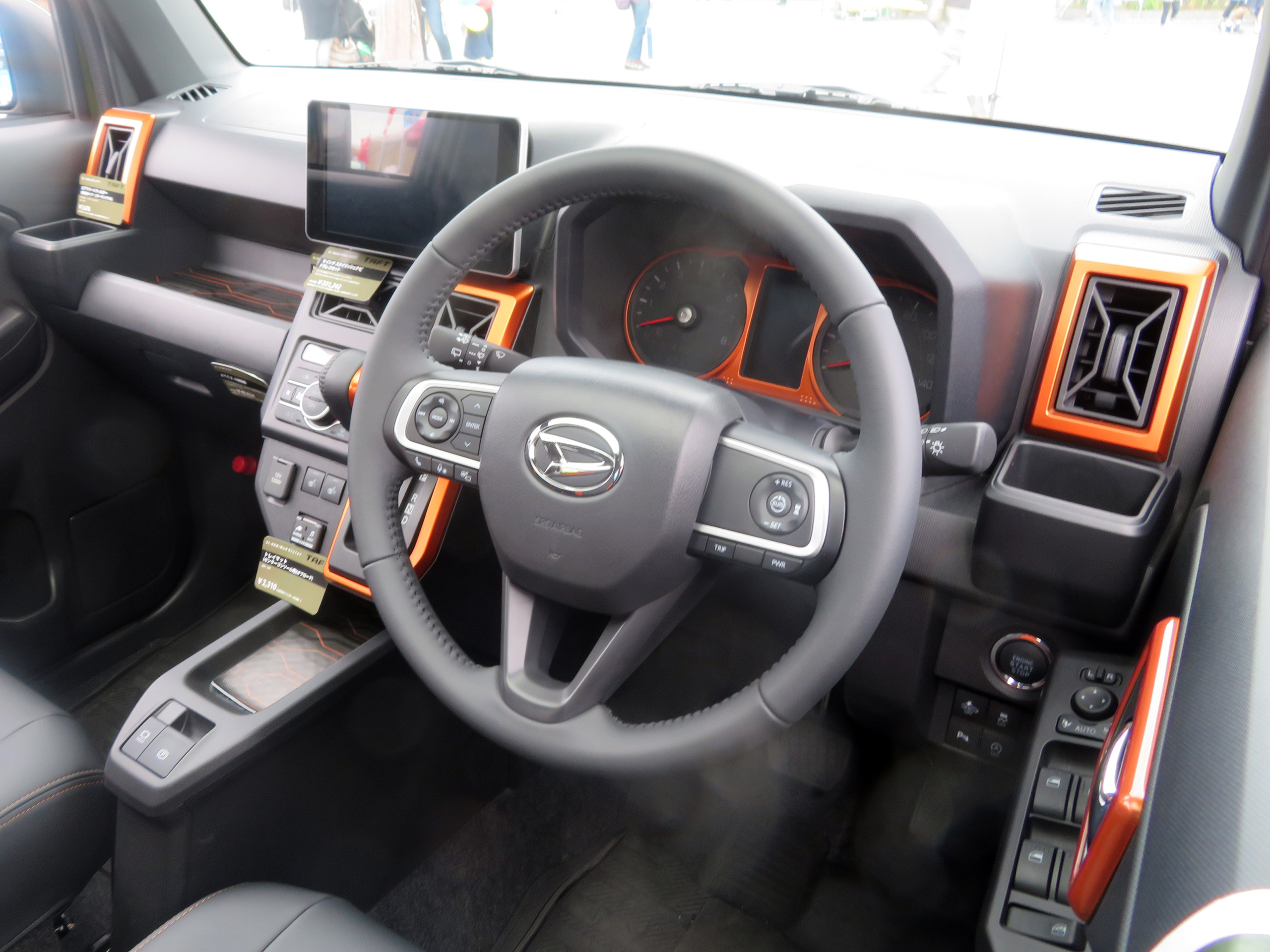
Interior

== Concept model ==
The Taft borrows its overall design from the WakuWaku concept car, which was one of four kei car concepts showcased at the 2019 Tokyo Motor Show.

According to Daihatsu, the WakuWaku was designed to be a versatile combination of crossover SUV and recreational vehicle. The concept has four seats, with two folding rear seats, hidden rear doors, and a trunk located on the roof of the car behind the sunroof.

The three other concept vehicles shown alongside the WakuWaku were the TsumuTsumu commercial truck, WaiWai minivan, and IcoIco autonomous vehicle.

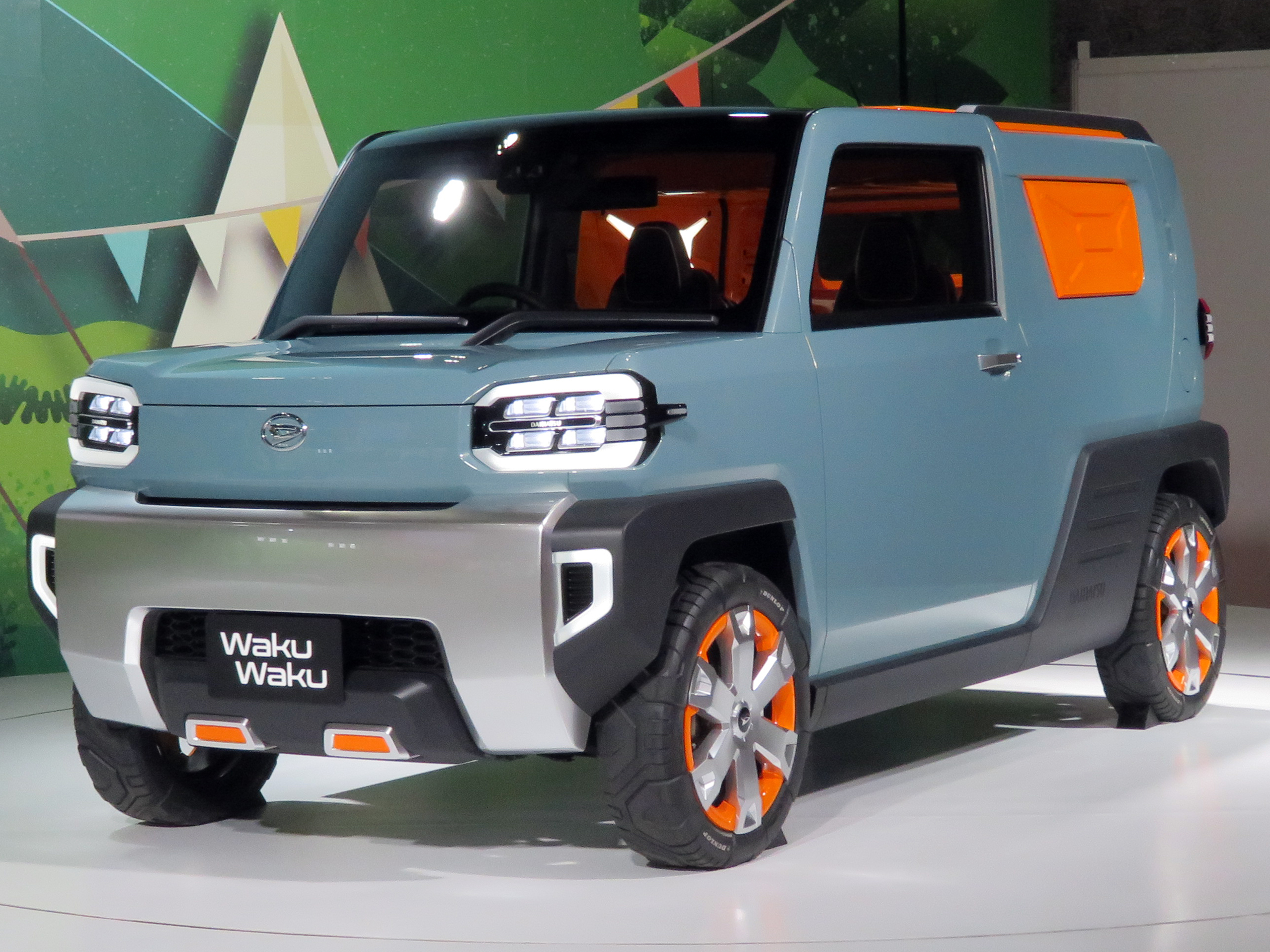
Daihatsu WakuWaku

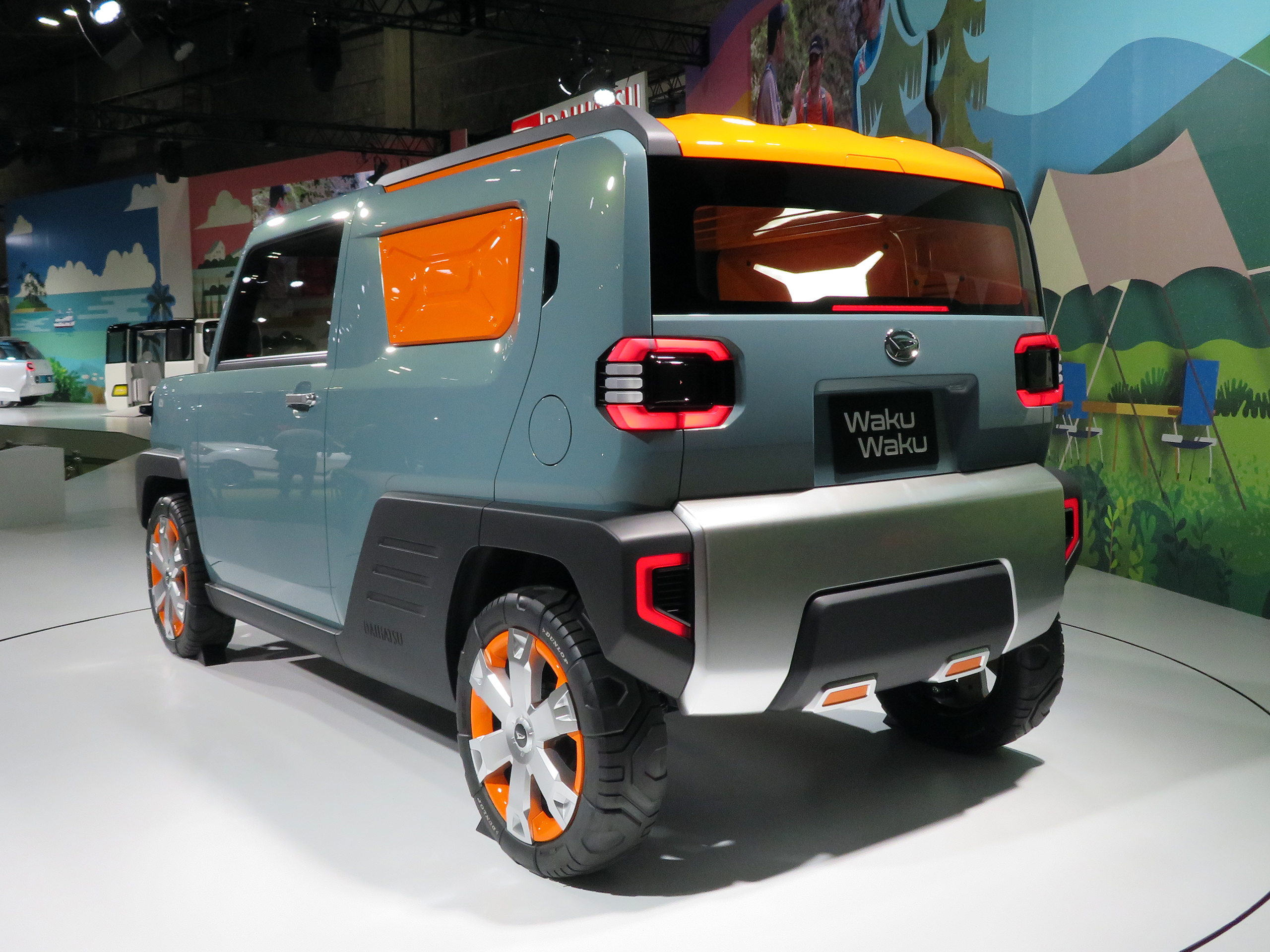
WakuWaku rear view

== Sales ==
Year	Japan
2020	42,942
2021	62,278
2022	56,861
2023	59,330
2024	38,204
