= Daihatsu Cast =

Kei car built by the Japanese manufacturer Daihatsu

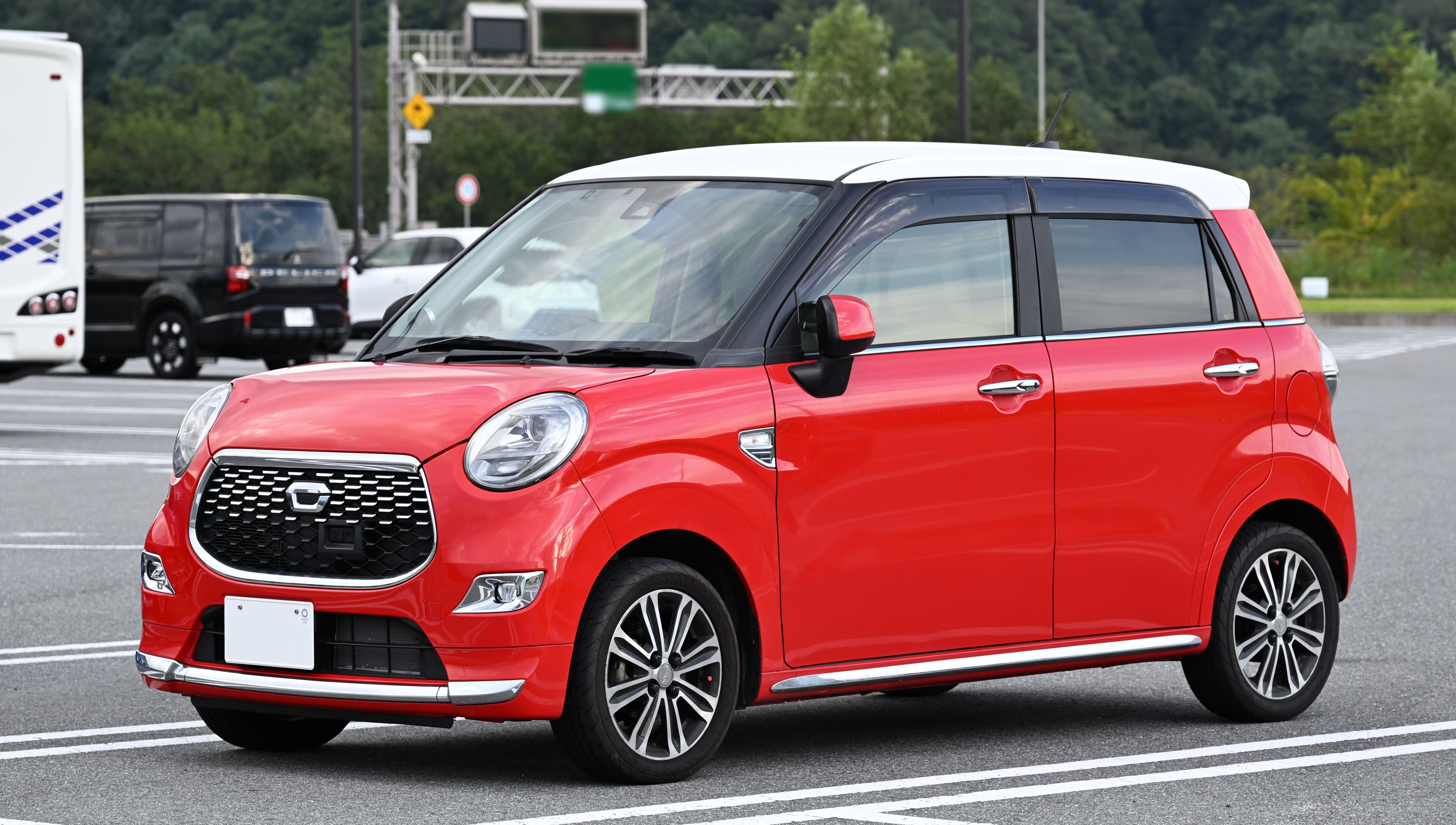
- 2015–2017 Daihatsu Cast Style G SA II (LA250S)

Overview
- Manufacturer: Daihatsu
- Model code: LA250
- Also called: Toyota Pixis Joy
- Production: September 2015 – June 2023 (Cast); August 2016 – June 2023 (Pixis Joy)
- Assembly: Japan: Nakatsu, Ōita (Daihatsu Motor Kyushu)

Body and chassis
- Class: Kei car
- Body style: 5-door hatchback
- Layout: Front-engine, front-wheel-drive; Front-engine, four-wheel-drive

Powertrain
- Engine: Petrol: 658 cc KF-VE I3; 658 cc KF-DET turbo I3
- Power output: 38 kW (51 hp; 52 PS) (KF-VE); 47 kW (63 hp; 64 PS) (KF-DET)
- Transmission: CVT

Dimensions
- Wheelbase: 2,455 mm (96.7 in)
- Length: 3,395 mm (133.7 in)
- Width: 1,475 mm (58.1 in)
- Height: 1,600–1,640 mm (63.0–64.6 in)
- Kerb weight: 840–850 kg (1,852–1,874 lb) (FWD); 890–900 kg (1,962–1,984 lb) (4WD)

Chronology
- Predecessor: Daihatsu Terios Kid (Cast Activa); Daihatsu Naked (Cast Activa); Daihatsu Sonica (Cast Sport); Toyota Pixis Space (Pixis Joy)
- Successor: Daihatsu Taft (LA900) (Cast Activa/Sport)

The Daihatsu Cast (Japanese: ダイハツ・キャスト, Hepburn: Daihatsu Kyasuto) is a kei car built by the Japanese manufacturer Daihatsu from 2015 to 2023. It comes in three variations designated, "Style", "Activa" and "Sport". Each one can be equipped with either front- or four-wheel drive configuration.

The Cast is also sold by Toyota as the Toyota Pixis Joy (Japanese: トヨタ・ピクシスジョイ, Hepburn: Toyota Pikushisu Joi), which was launched on 31 August 2016.

== Overview ==
The Cast Style/Pixis Joy F is targeted at customers who desire an upmarket small passenger vehicle; the Cast Activa/Pixis Joy C is marketed primarily as a light off-road capable crossover with a minimum ground clearance of 175 mm (6.9 in), while the Cast Sport/Pixis Joy S is given such features as handling-oriented suspension tuning to increase its appeal to performance customers. A continuously variable transmission is fitted on all models and the Sport variant is sold with a 7-speed paddle-shifted mode.

The Cast was lightly facelifted in October 2017, including new grilles for the Style and Activa models and new colors (inside and out). The Smart Assist collision avoidance system was updated to the third generation, called the "SA III".

The Activa and Sport variants (as well as the Pixis Joy C and S) were discontinued in March 2020, leaving only the Style variant. Both variants were replaced by the more rugged SUV-styled LA900 series Taft.

== Gallery ==
Cast

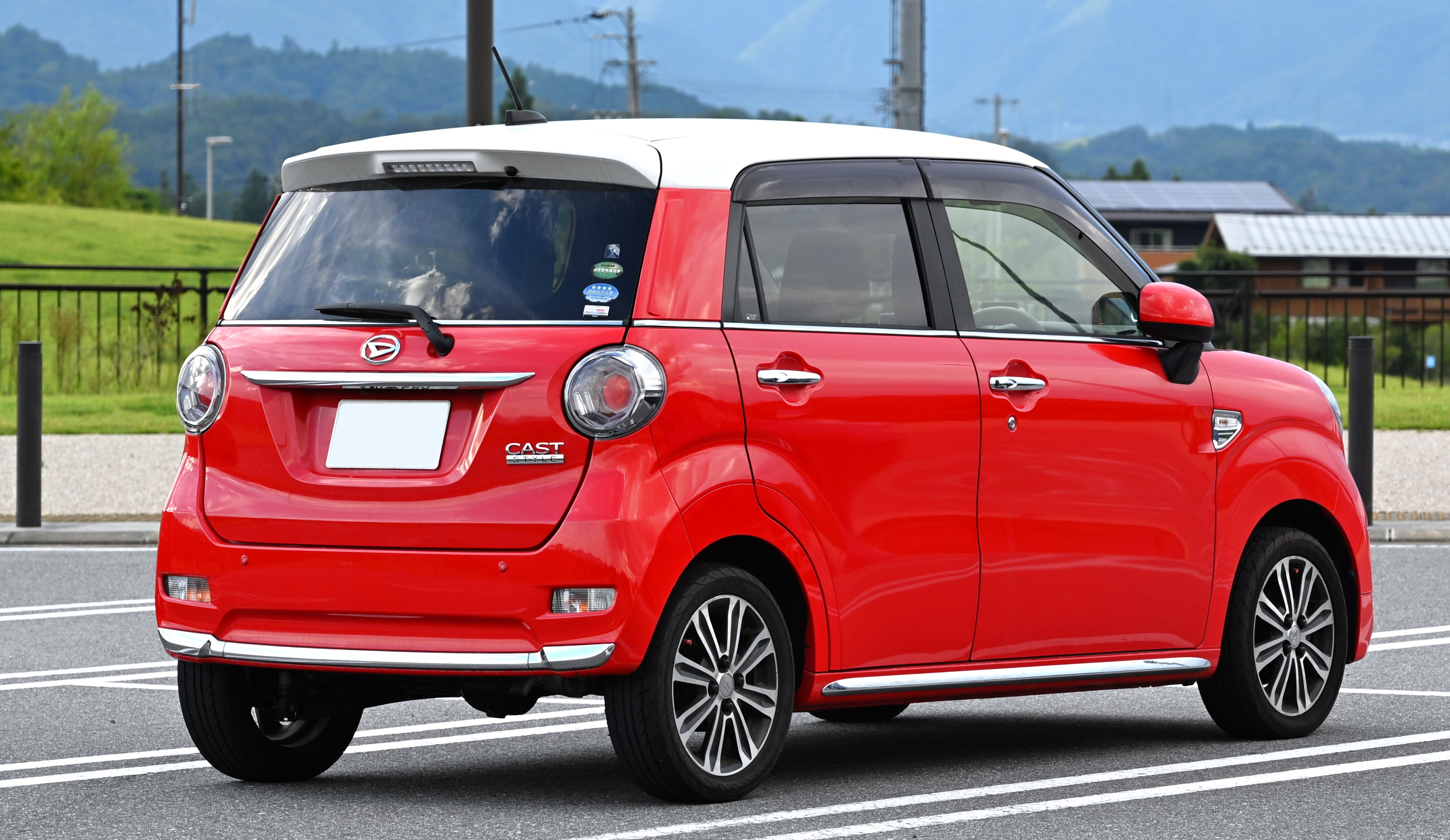
2015–2017 Cast Style G SA II (LA250S)

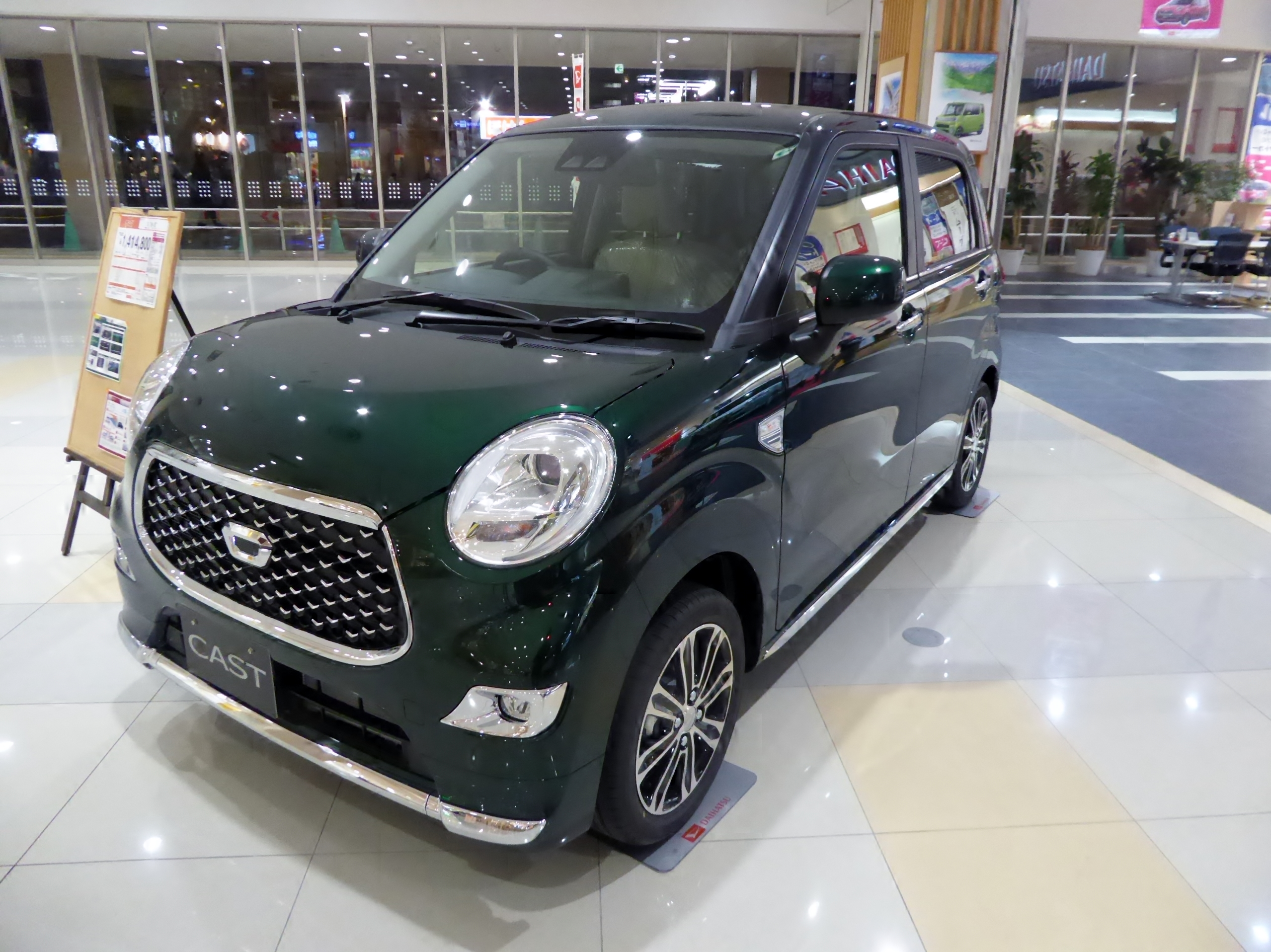
2017 Cast Style G SA III (LA250S)

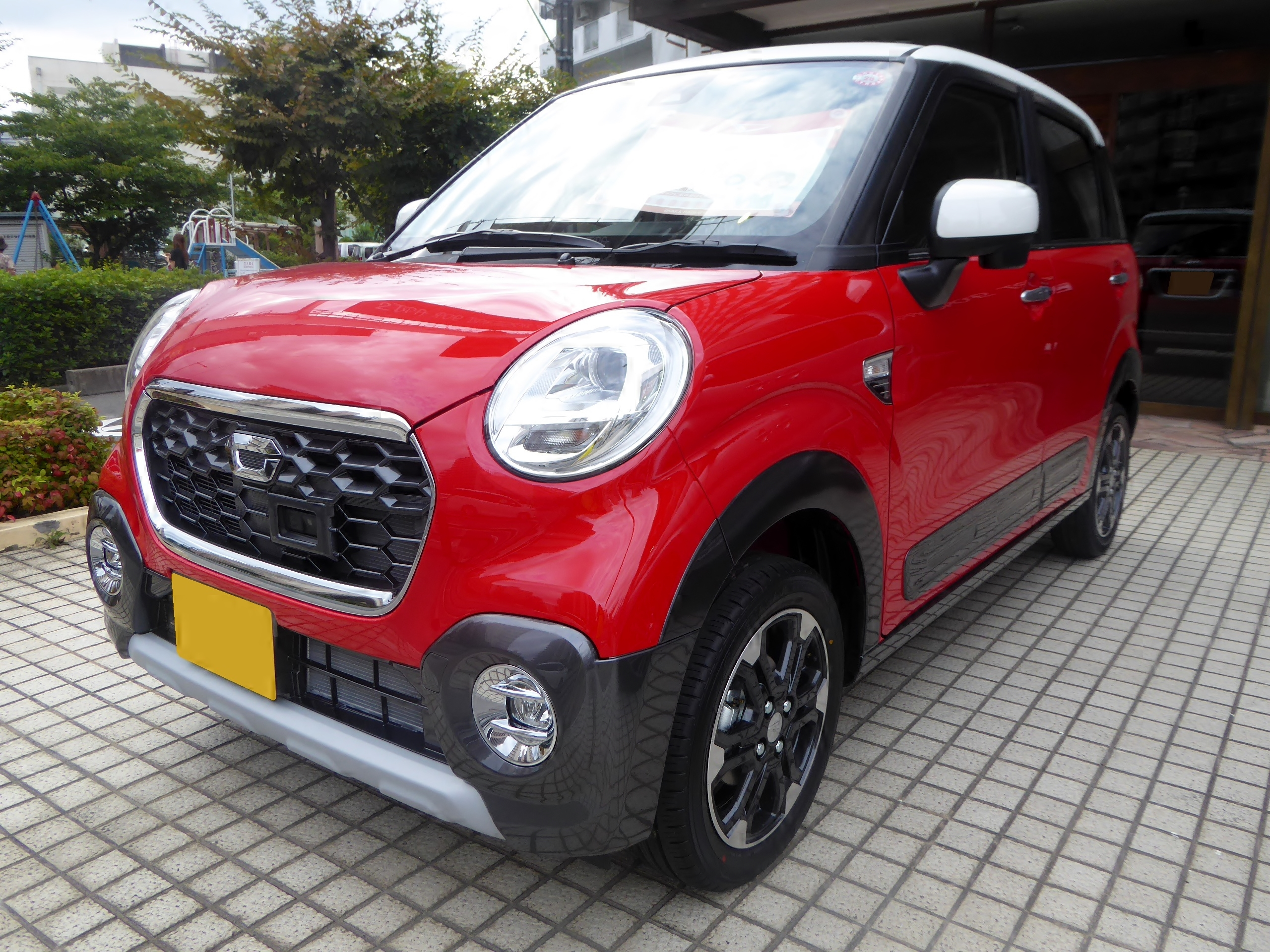
2015 Cast Activa G SA II (LA250S)

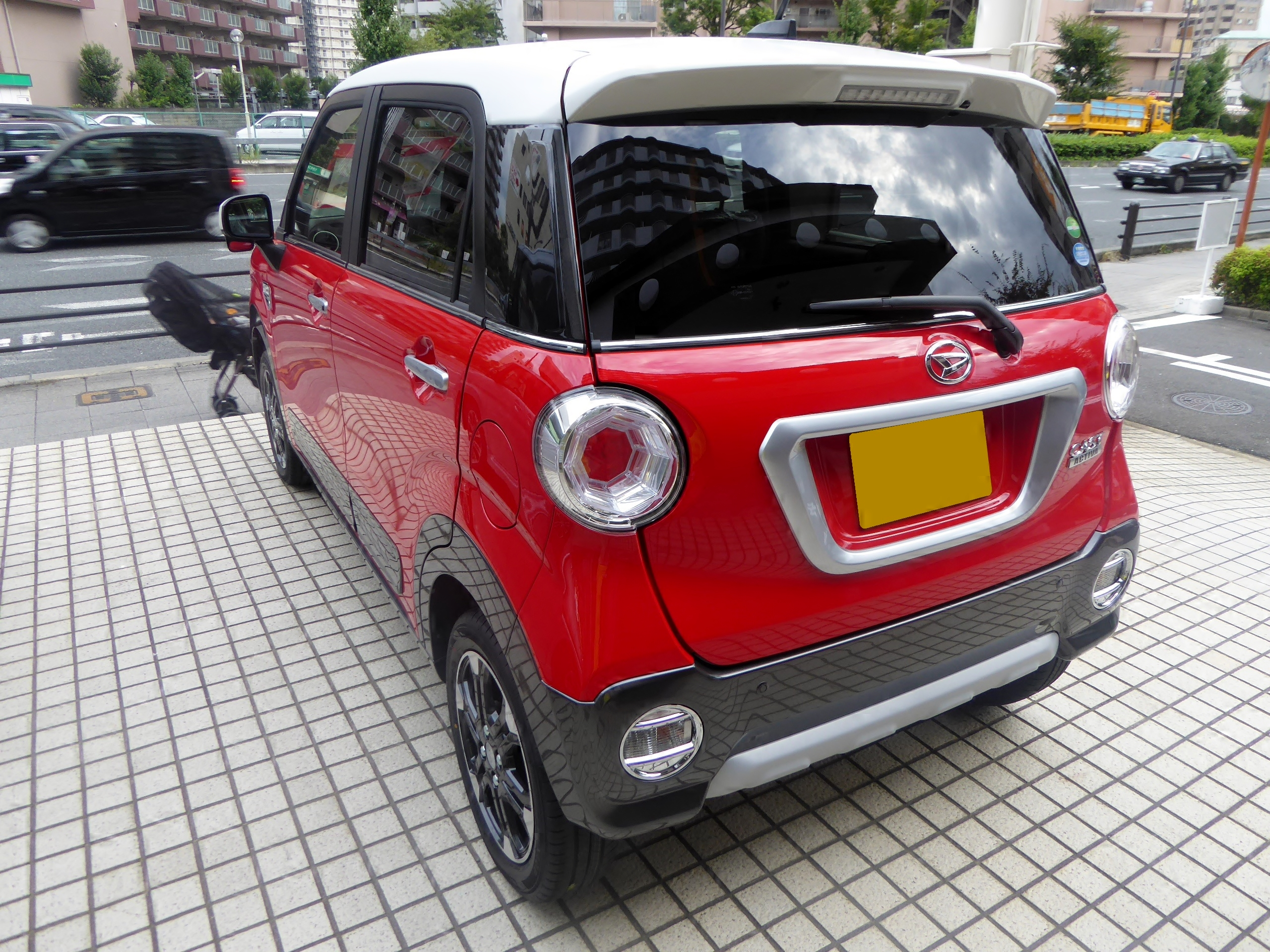
2015 Cast Activa G SA II (LA250S)

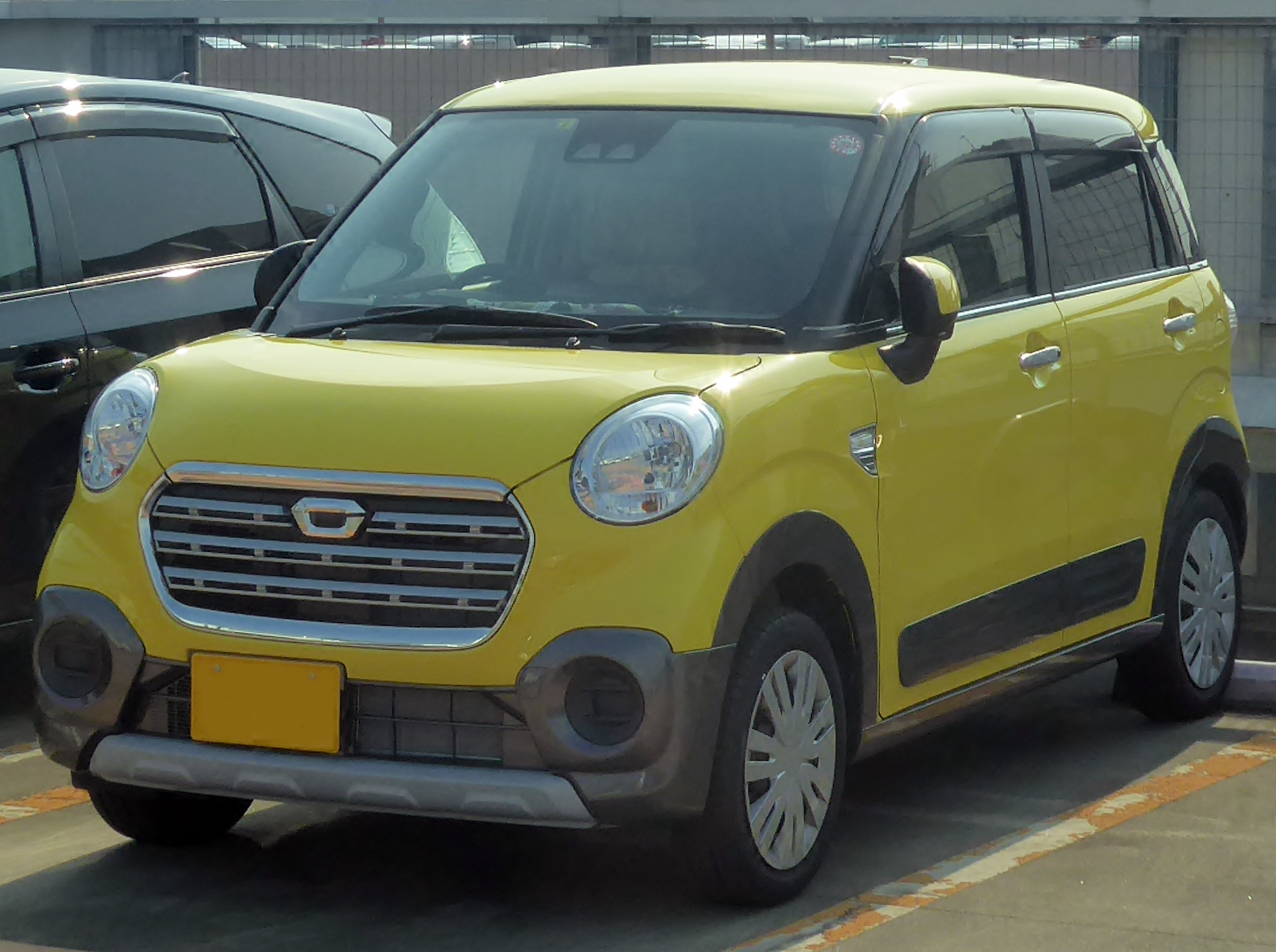
2017 Cast Activa X SA III (LA250S)

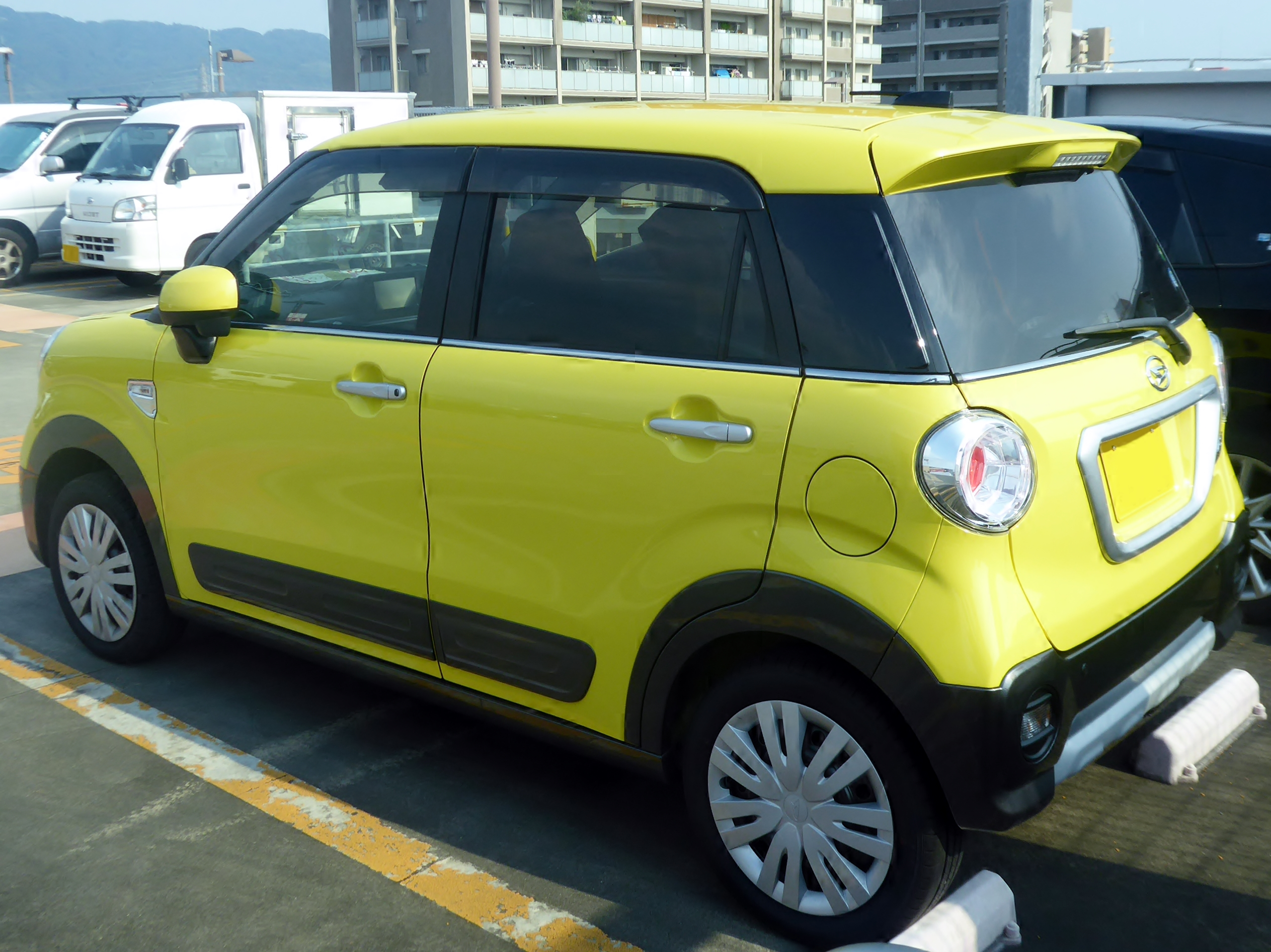
2017 Cast Activa X SA III (LA250S)

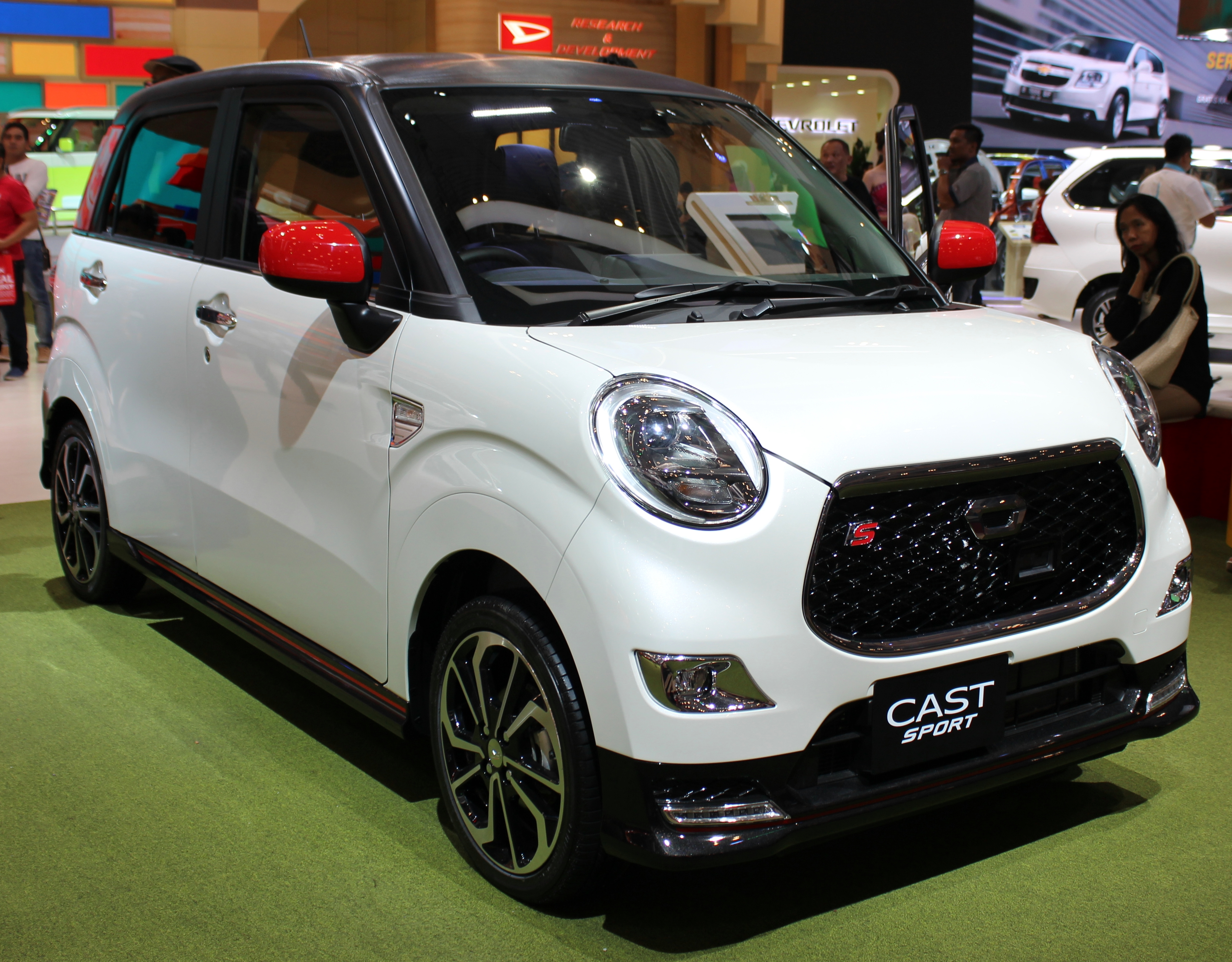
2016 Cast Sport SA II (LA250S)

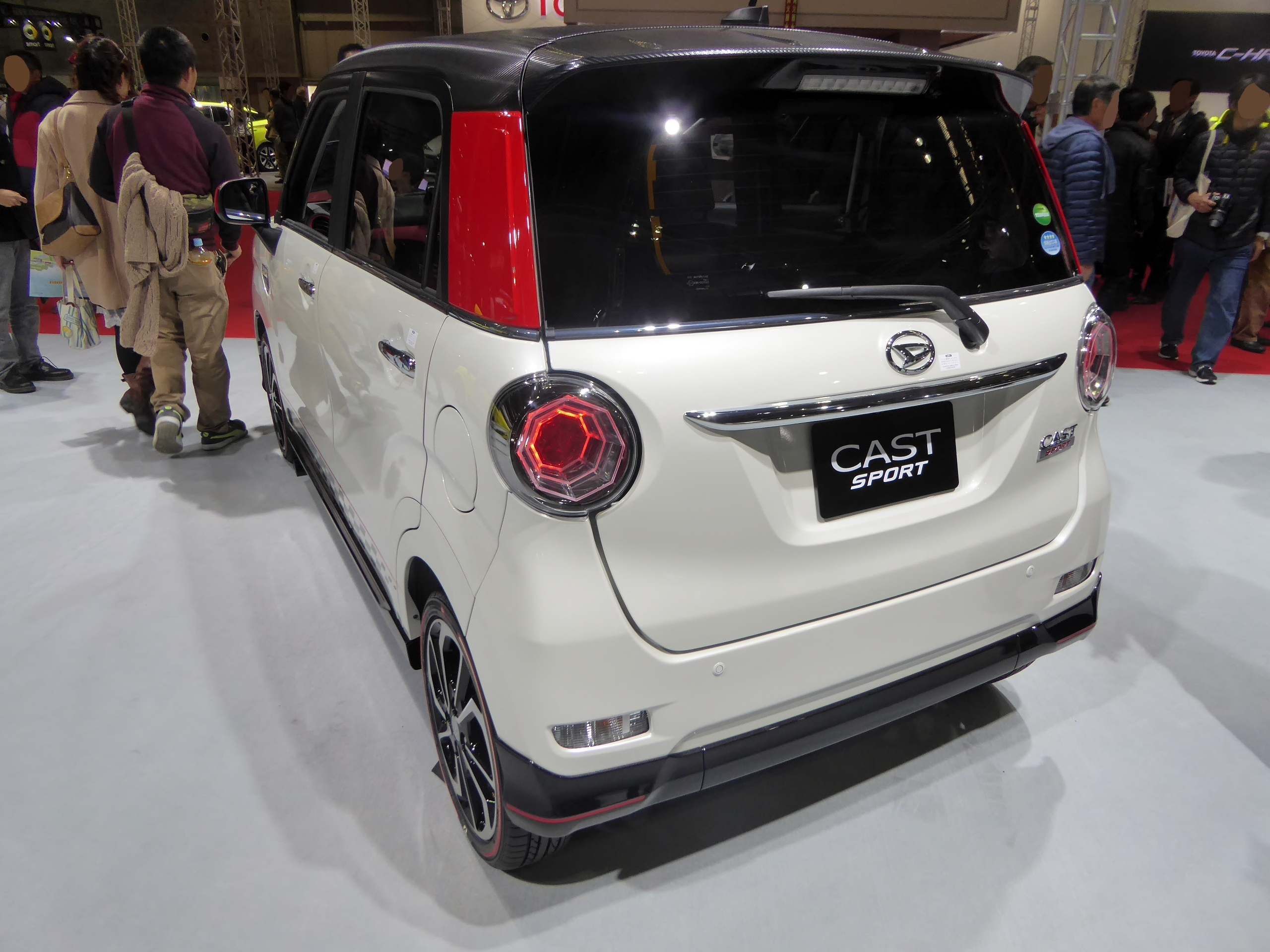
2015 Cast Sport SA II (LA250S)

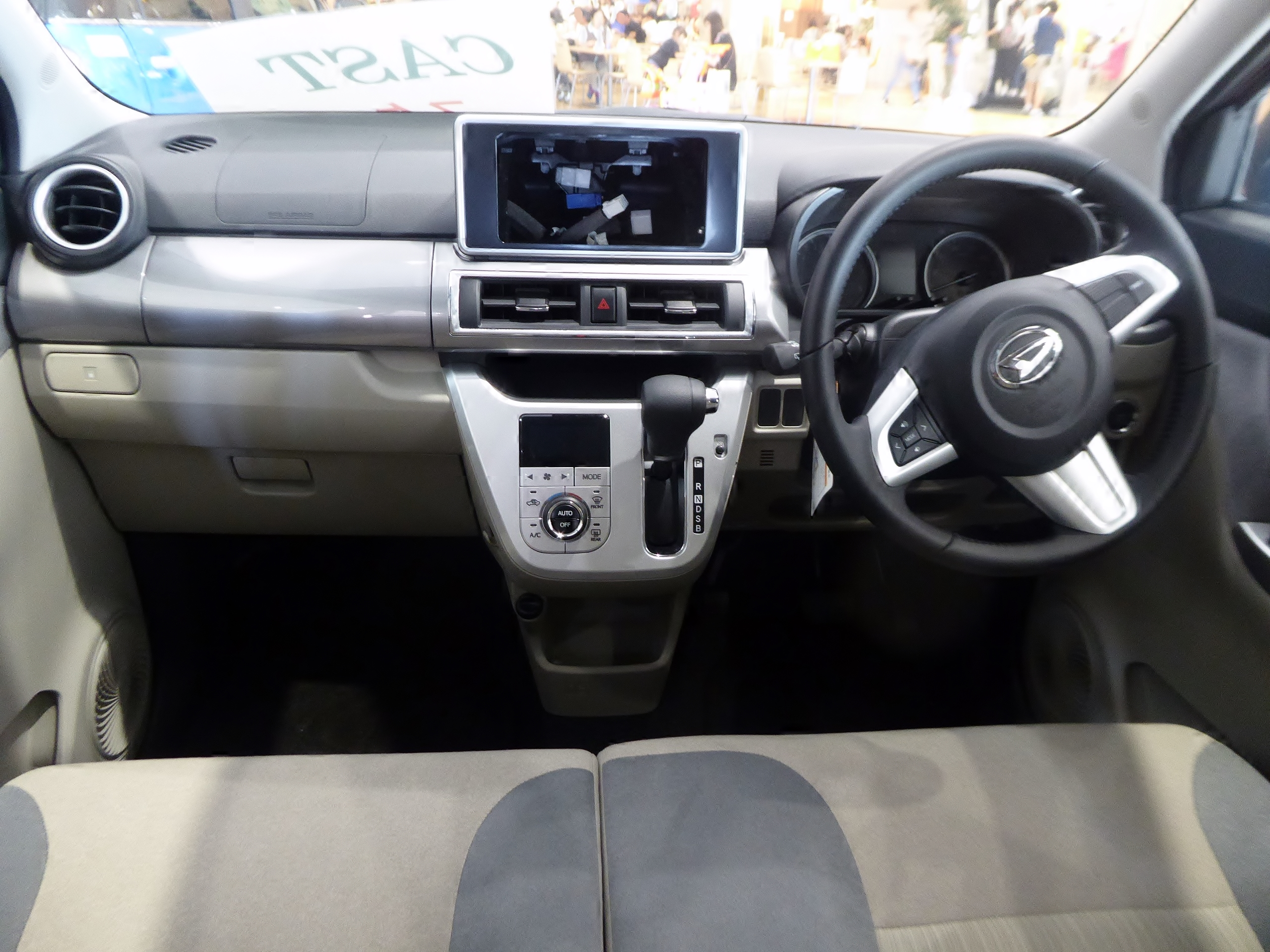
Cast Style interior

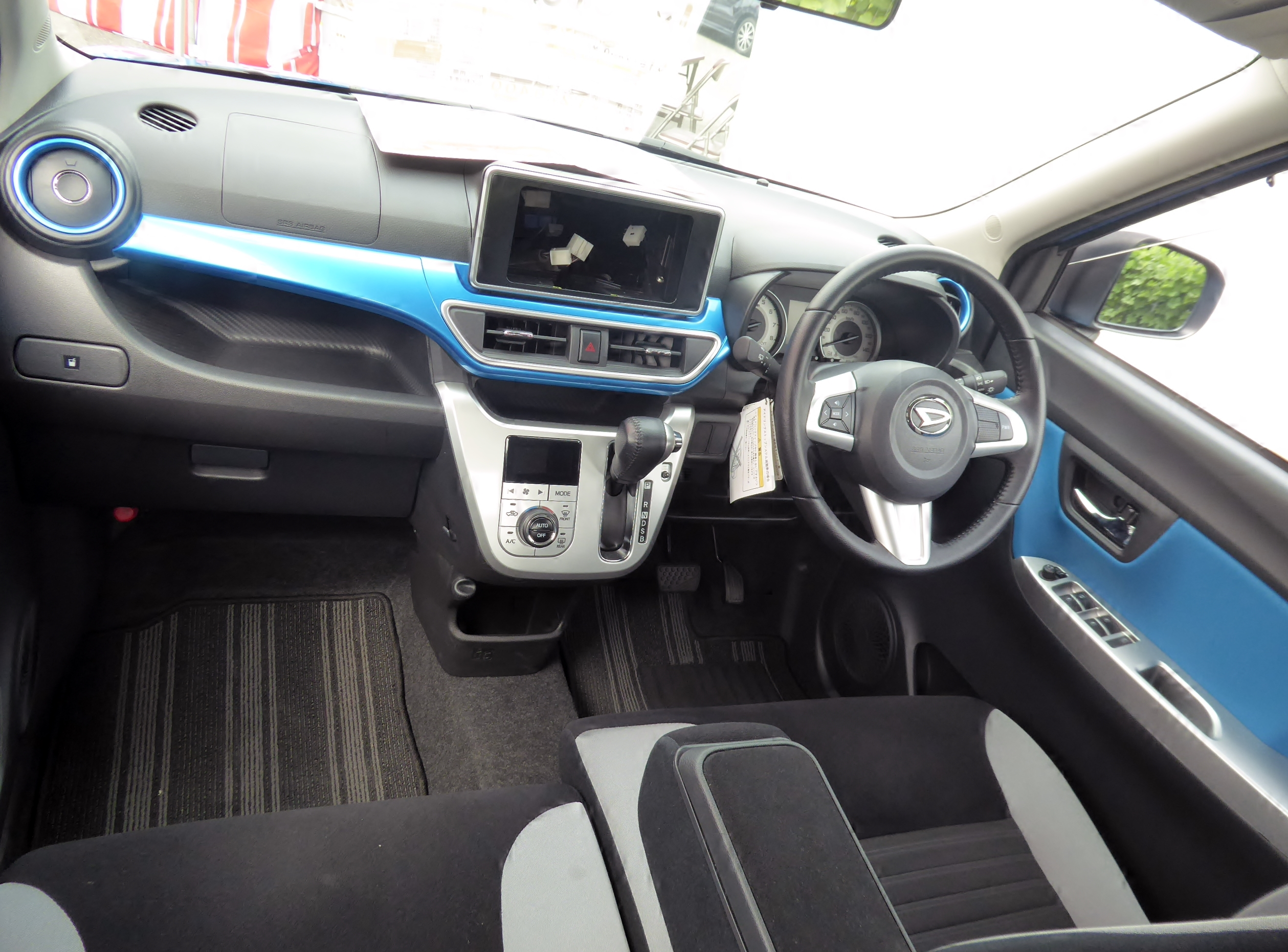
Cast Activa interior

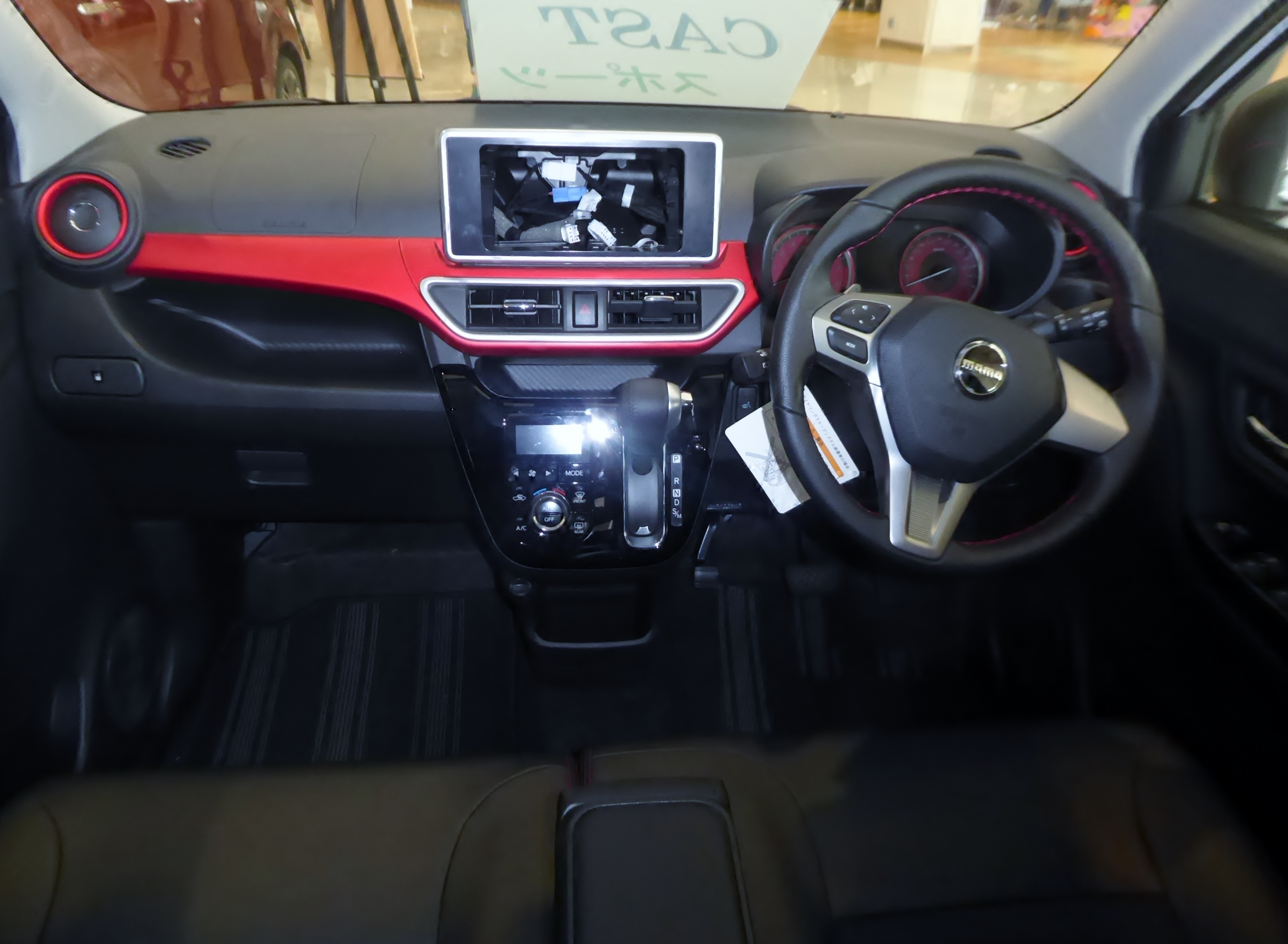
Cast Sport interior

Pixis Joy

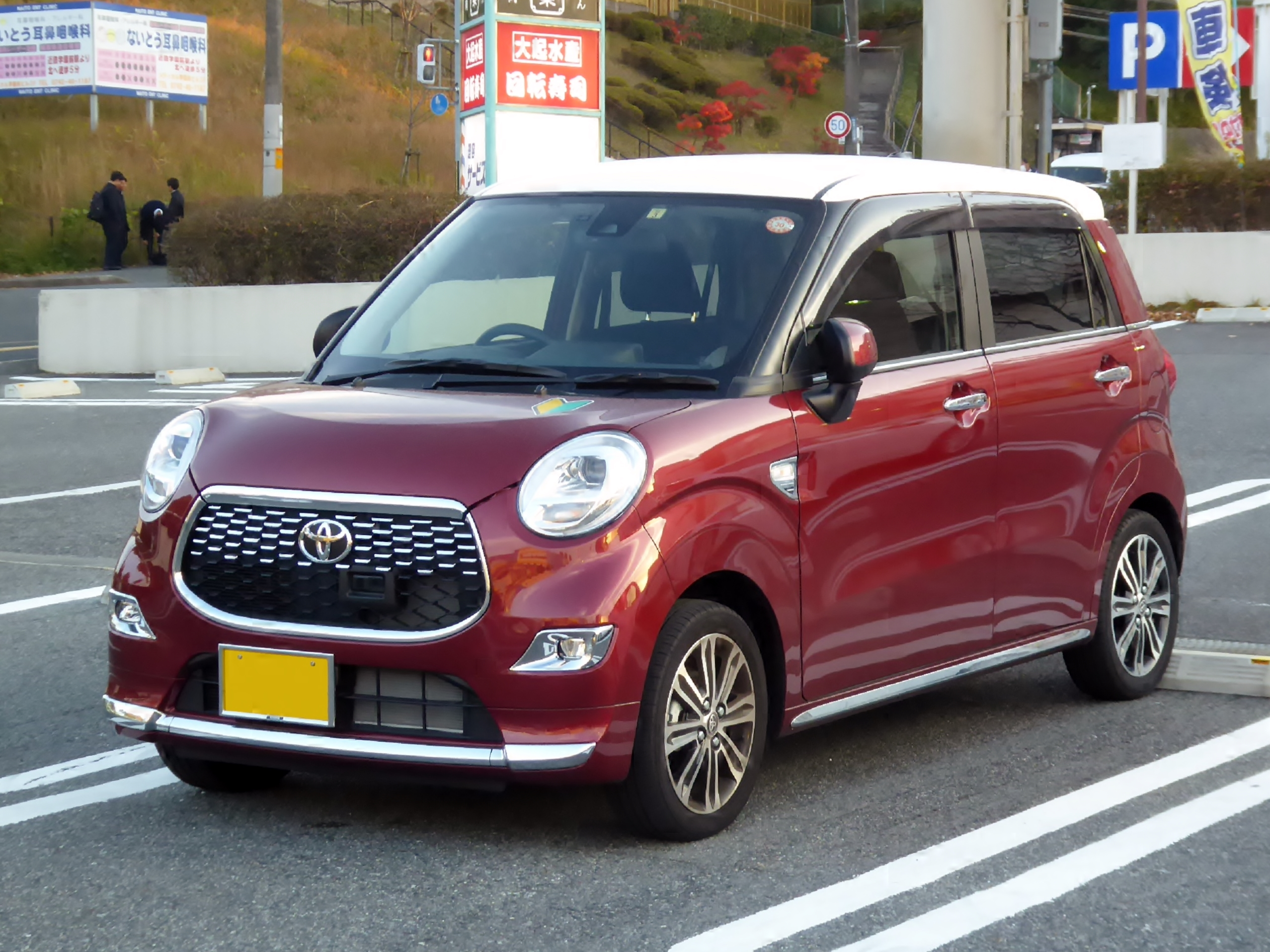
Toyota Pixis Joy F G Turbo SA II (LA250A)

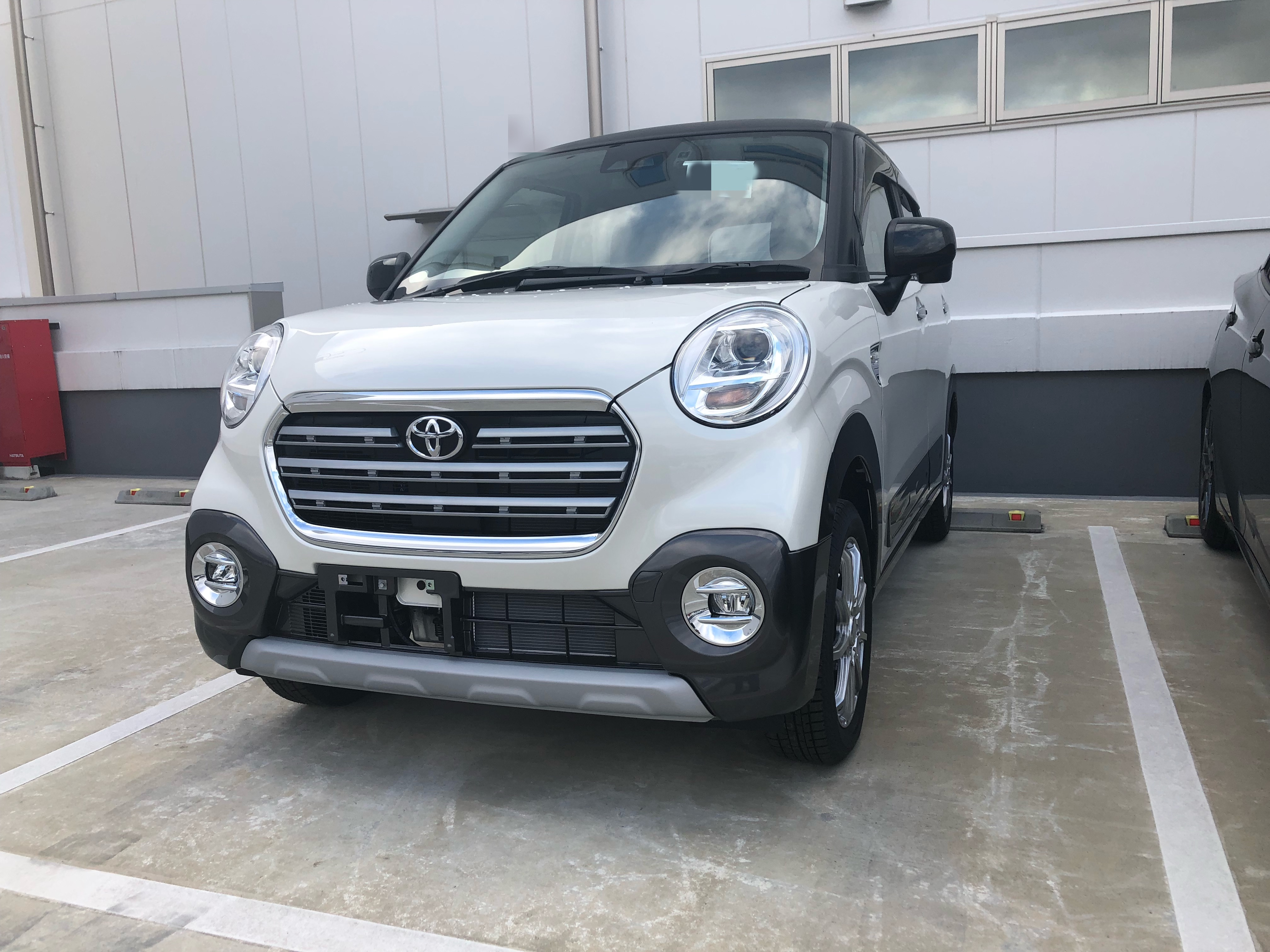
Pixis Joy C (LA250A)

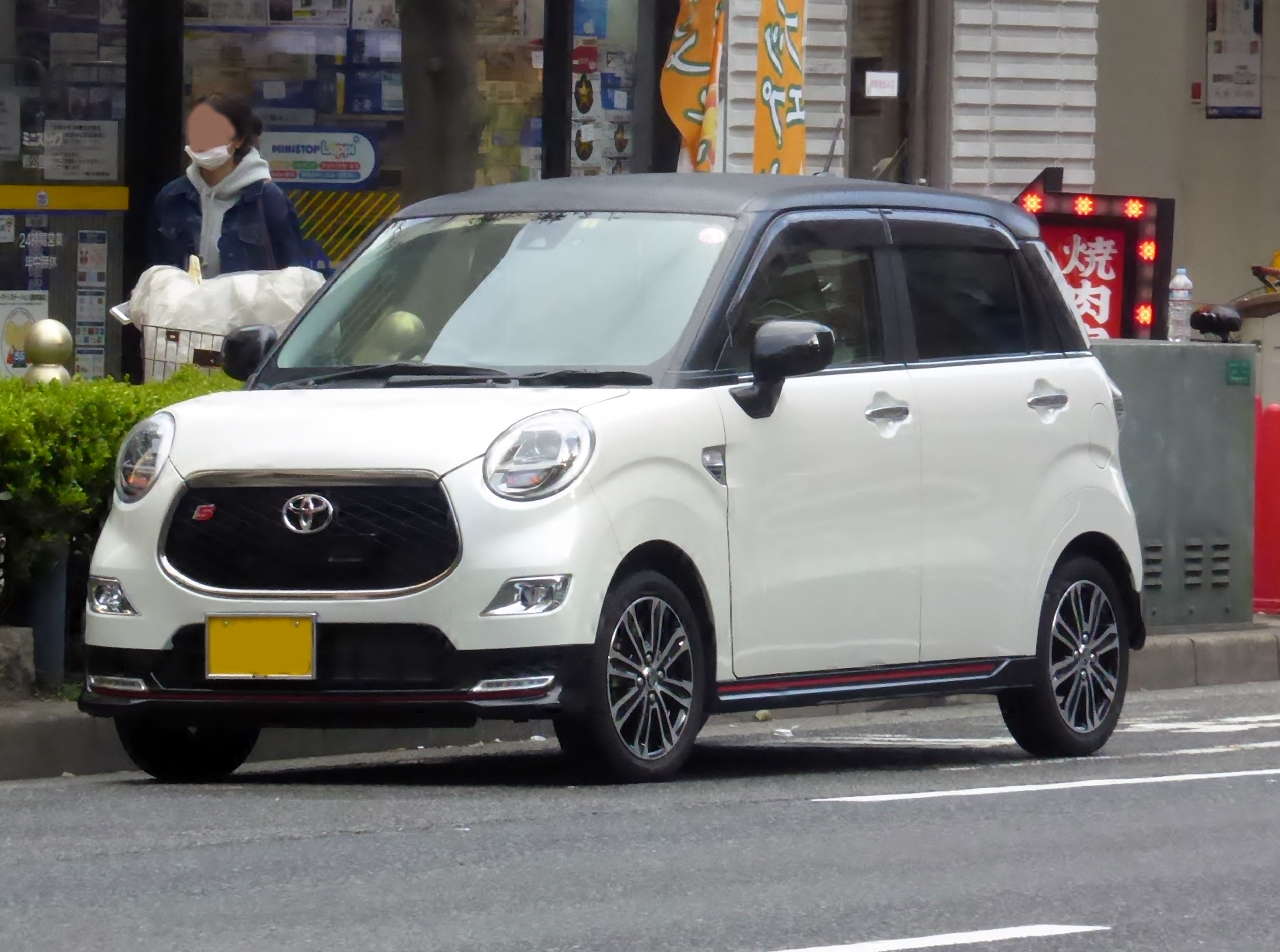
Pixis Joy S SA II (LA250A)

== Sales ==
In September 2015, Daihatsu set monthly sales target for the Cast at 5,000 units. The Cast managed to exceed the target in 2016 but underperformed in the later years. It had a fairly long production run by Japanese standards, being discontinued at the end of June 2023.

Year	Japan
2015	32,324
2016	66,290
2017	45,540
2018	42,495
2019	40,341
2020	20,701
2021	17,113
2022	15,073
2023	8,181
