= Nude (disambiguation) =

Being nude is the state of nudity, being unclothed.

Nude may also refer to:

== Art ==
- Nude (art), usually referred to as "The Nude", is a genre of art having the unclothed human body as its primary subject
- Nude (Renoir, Belgrade, 1910), a painting by Pierre-Auguste Renoir
- Nude (Charis, Santa Monica), a photograph taken by Edward Weston in 1936

== Music ==
- Nude (band), an international rock band, based in California
- Nude Records, a record label

=== Albums ===
- Nude (Camel album), 1981
- Nude (Dead or Alive album), 1989
  - Nude (Remixed, Remodelled, Remixed), a remix album by Dead or Alive, 1991
- Nude (VAST album)
- Nude (Aco album), 1997
- Nude (Loreen album), 2017
- Nude (Sammi Cheng EP), 2017

=== Songs ===
- "Nude" (song), by Radiohead
- "Nu-Di-Ty", a song by Kylie Minogue from X
- "The Nude", a song by Catherine Wheel from Chrome
- "Nxde" (pronounced "Nude") a song by (G)I-dle from I Love

== Film ==
- Nude (2017 American film), directed by Anthony B. Sacco and Josh Shade
- Nude (2017 Marathi film), directed by Ravi Jadhav

== Other uses ==
- NUDE (the National Union of Domestic Employees), founded by Clotil Walcott in Trinidad and Tobago.
- N.U.D.E.@ Natural Ultimate Digital Experiment, a 2003 video game
- Nude, Iran, a village in Gilan Province, Iran

== See also ==
- Nudes (disambiguation)
- Naked (disambiguation)
- Nudie (disambiguation)
