= Naked (Zheng Jun album) =

Studio album by Zheng Jun
- Released: 1994
- Label: Red Star

Naked (赤裸裸 Chìluǒluǒ) is the 1994 debut album of Chinese rock musician Zheng Jun.

The album's hit single was "Huidao Lasa" (回到拉萨 Return to Lhasa), though not all reviewers were equally enthusiastic about the Han musician's treatment of "Tibetan" sounds. Nancy Chen called the song "a saccharine ode to the beauties of an exoticized Tibet". The title "Naked", according to Zheng", is a complaint against China's commercialism as it "articulates his antagonism to the materialism, commercialization, and fakery that he believes...has taken over China in recent years". After the success of Naked, Zheng Jun departed from Red Star to PolyGram, causing a legal complaint by Red Star who believed he was obliged to produce two more albums, but the Chinese court found in favour of PolyGram who produced the next album.
