= Daihatsu Naked =

Kei car manufactured by Daihatsu

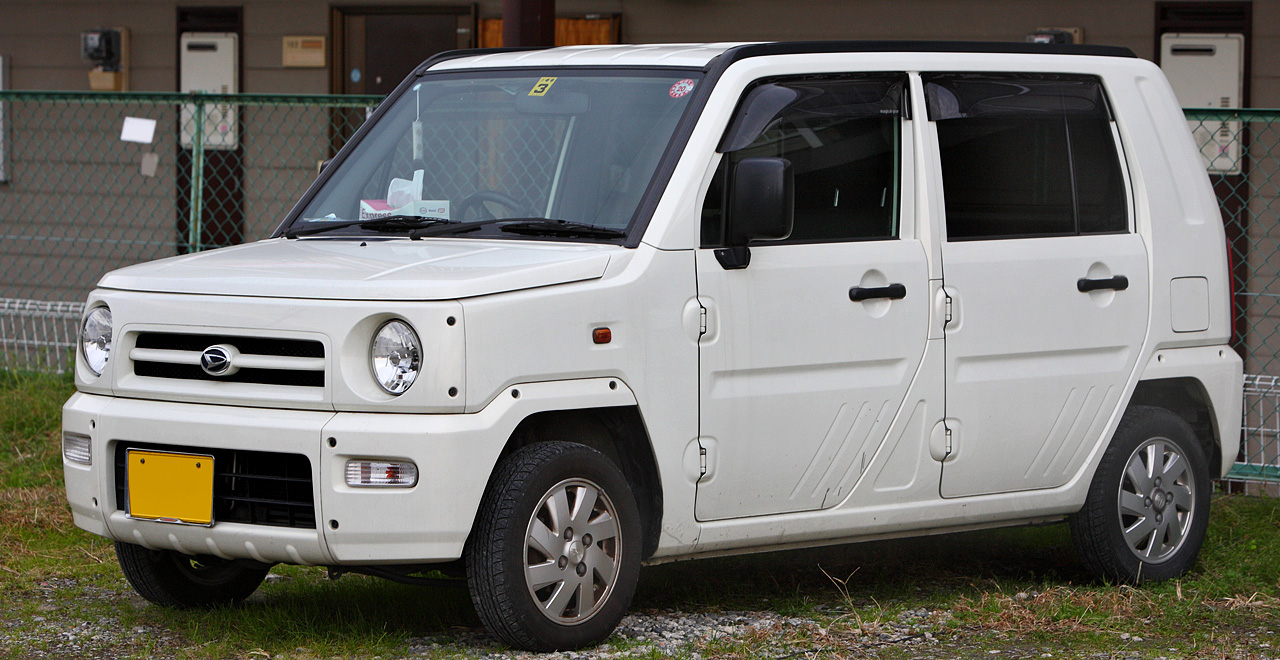

Overview
- Manufacturer: Daihatsu
- Model code: L750
- Production: November 1999 – November 2003
- Assembly: Japan

Body and chassis
- Class: Kei car
- Body style: 5-door hatchback
- Layout: Front-engine, front-wheel-drive; Front-engine, four-wheel-drive
- Related: Daihatsu Mira (L700)

Powertrain
- Engine: 658 cc EF-VE I3; 658 cc EF-DET turbo I3
- Power output: 43 kW (58 PS) (EF-VE); 47 kW (64 PS) (EF-DET)
- Transmission: 5-speed manual; 4-speed automatic

Dimensions
- Wheelbase: 2,360 mm (92.9 in)
- Length: 3,395 mm (133.7 in)
- Width: 1,475 mm (58.1 in)
- Height: 1,530–1,550 mm (60.2–61.0 in)
- Kerb weight: 820–890 kg (1,808–1,962 lb)

Chronology
- Predecessor: Daihatsu Mira RV-4
- Successor: Daihatsu Cast Activa; Daihatsu Taft (LA900)

The Daihatsu Naked (Japanese: ダイハツ・ネイキッド, Hepburn: Daihatsu Neikiddo) is a kei car built by the Japanese automaker Daihatsu from 1999 to 2003. It was first presented as a concept at the 1997 Tokyo Motor Show, while the production ready model was shown there in 1999. The styling included features such as ridges in the doors and exposed hinges and bolts, designed to make the car appear rugged and simple, in the vein of military vehicles.

== Description ==
It was available with a naturally aspirated or turbocharged, 658 cc petrol engine paired with either front- or four-wheel drive. The Naked was an early example of styling features from off-roaders, such as the exposed hinges and grooved pressings in the door panels, being used on road cars; this idea has since been used on cars such as the Rover Streetwise, Citroën C3 XTR, and Volkswagen CrossPolo. The interior styling has similarities to that of the original Fiat Panda, with plastic mouldings that resemble the fabric on the Panda's dashboard. The rear seat was also designed to be easily removed, and the rear of the car featured a number of attachment points for straps and hooks.

The Naked was available with a five-speed manual, but the overwhelming majority was fitted with the four-speed automatic transmission. In January 2002 a column-shifted version of the automatic was added to the lineup; this layout allowed the front seats to be replaced by a full bench.

== Changes ==
The first revision to the lineup came at the end of May 2000, when the "S Edition" was added. This special edition was based on the Naked G Package but added a double-DIN CD/AM/FM stereo and front speakers, power-folding door mirrors, inner A-pillar garnish, full wheel covers, and more at a minimal markup in price. In July 2000, to meet new regulations, seat belt pretensioners became standard equipment. In October, a start-stop system was fitted, along with power retractable side mirrors.

There was a minor change in January 2002, when the taillights were changed to larger units which wrapped around the rear corners. The better equipped Naked G received a new, mesh grille. While the original Naked was fitted with round, recessed headlights, a special version called the Naked F was also shown at this time, with flush-fitted rectangular headlights and a full-width grille. The Naked F also had lower suspension, in keeping with its less "off-roady" demeanor. Production ended in November 2003, after 91,549 examples had been built, although sales from stock continued until April 2004.

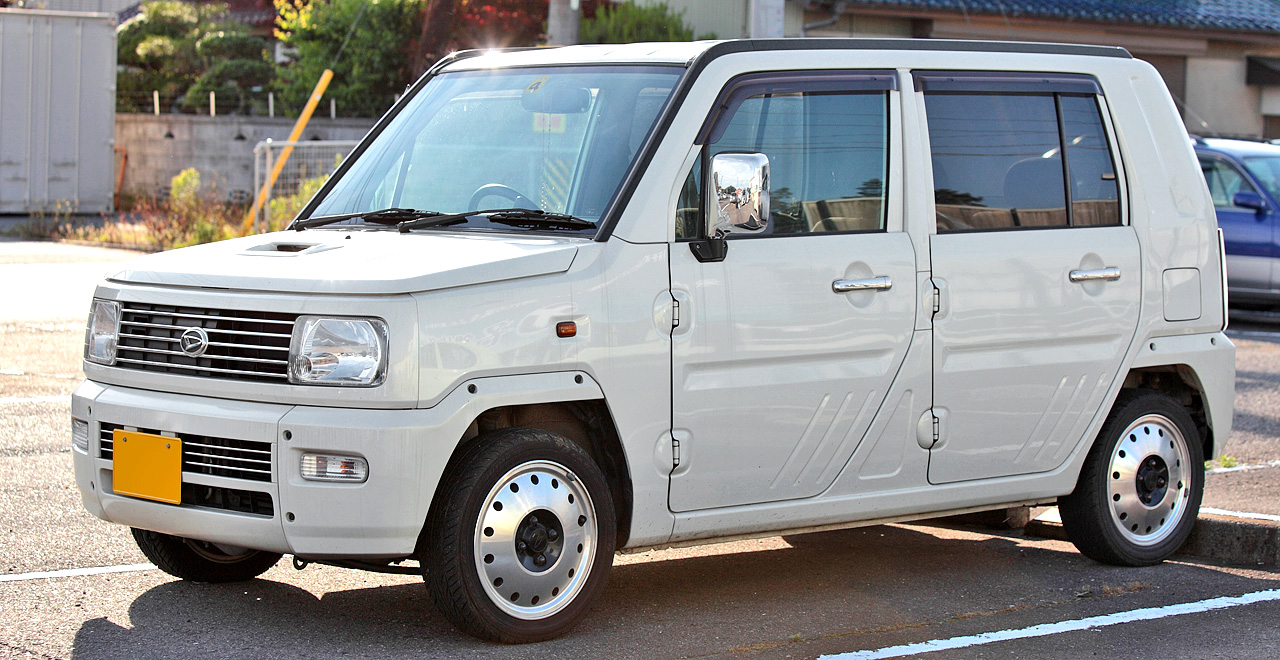
Daihatsu Naked Turbo F (L750S)

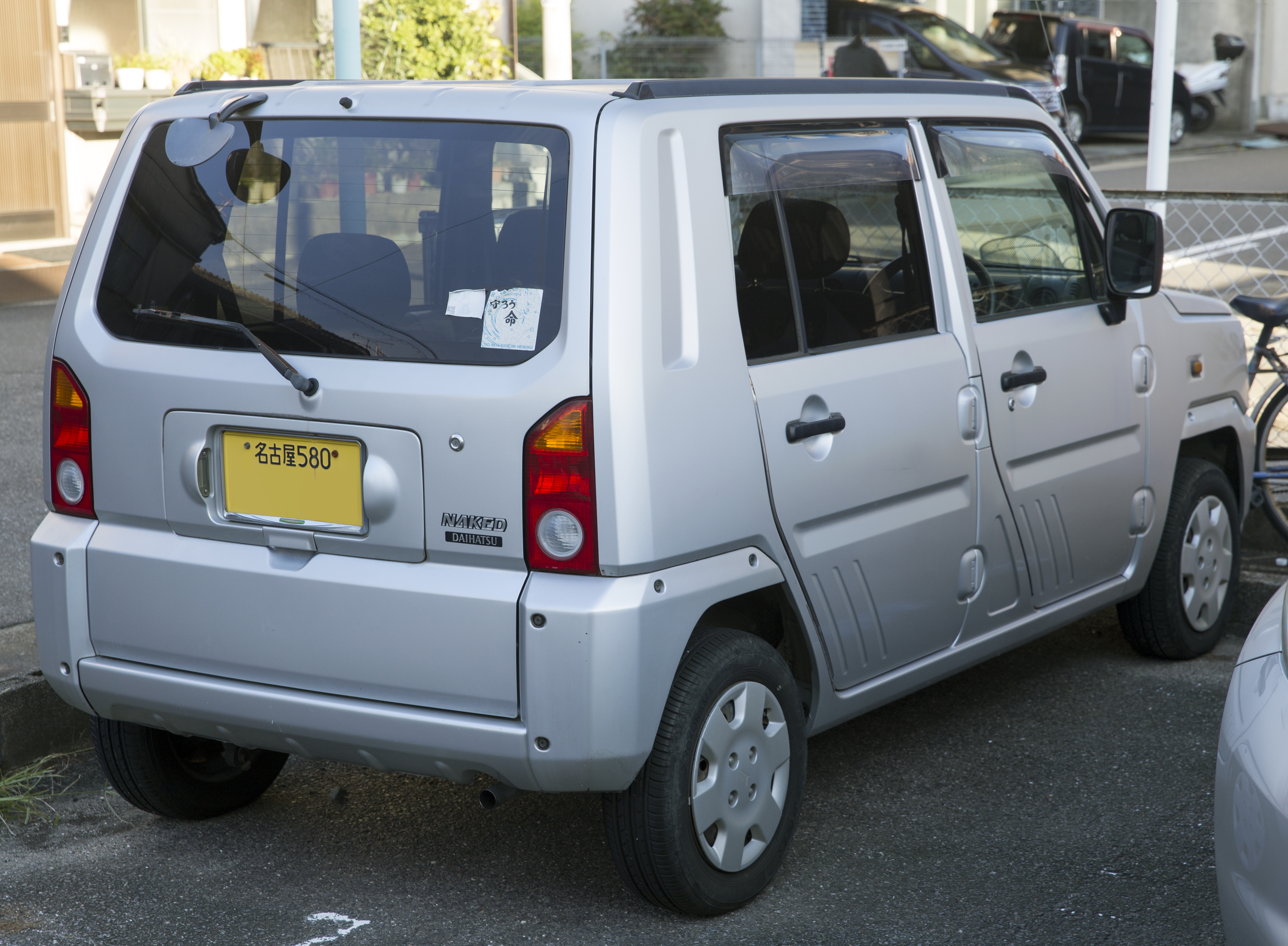
Daihatsu Naked G, rear view (L750S; pre-facelift)

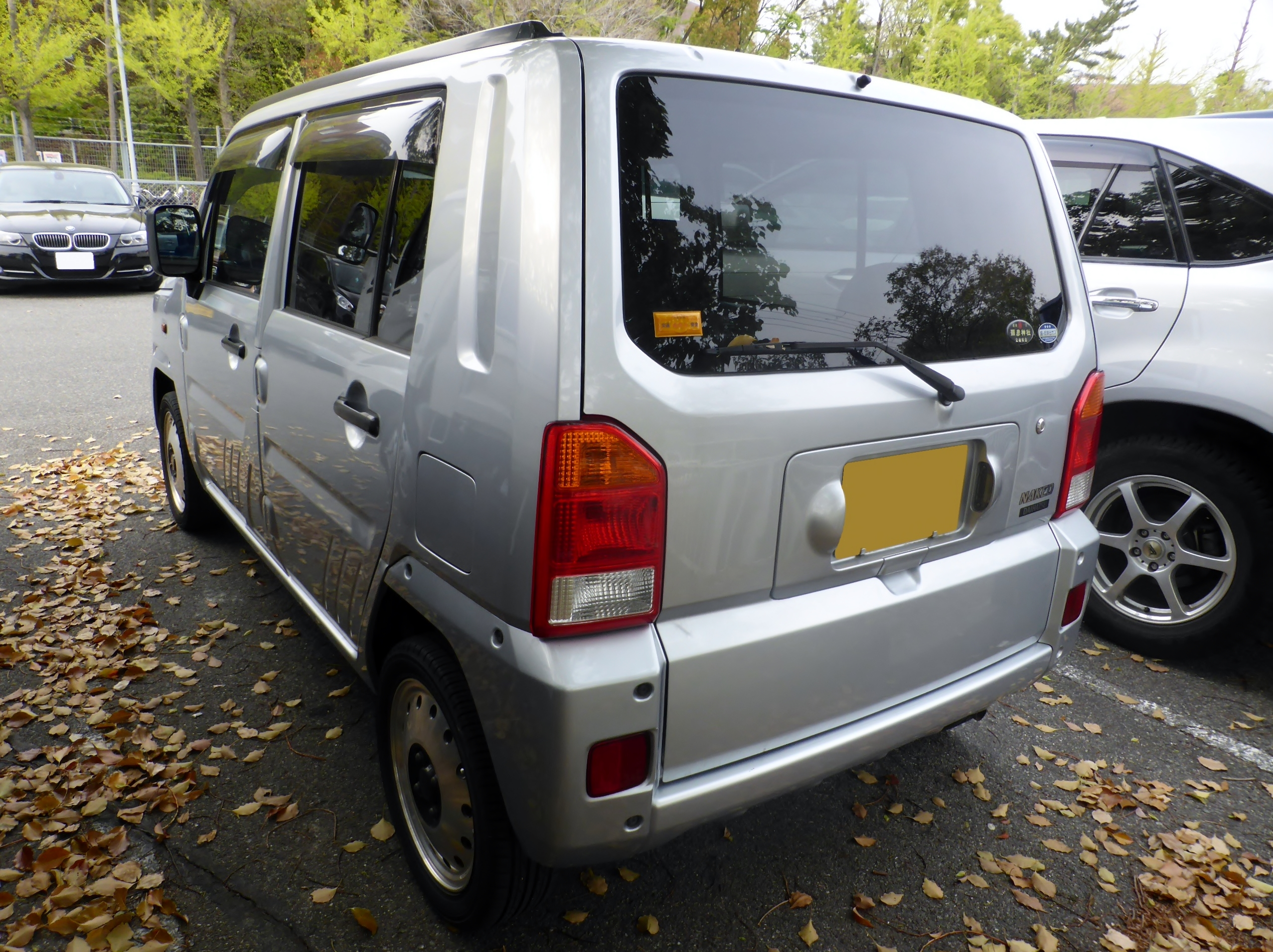
Daihatsu Naked G Limited, rear view (L750S; facelift model)
