= Entreposto =

Portuguese Industrial Group of Companies

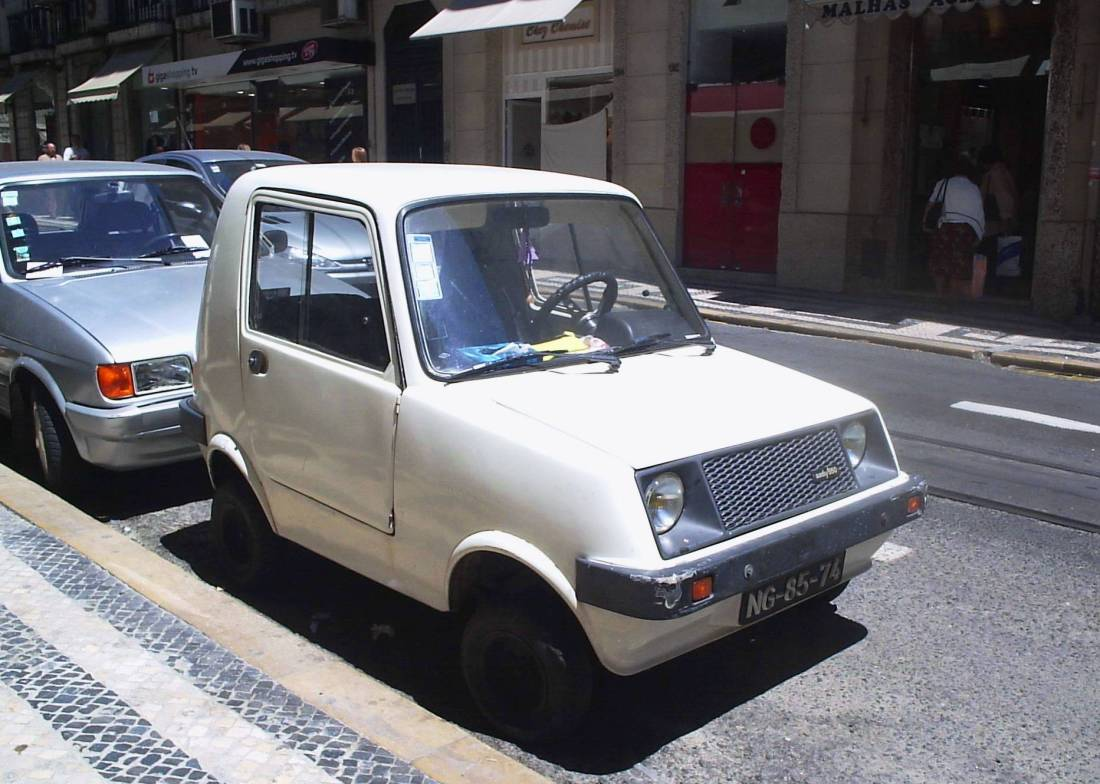
Sado 550

Entreposto is a Portuguese commercial and industrial group of companies. It was founded in Portugal in 1967 as an associate company of Nissan.

The 1970s were a time of economic depression in Portugal, particularly after the April 1974 revolution. Entreposto charged a group of engineers with developing a new automobile to meet the need for low-cost transportation. In 1975, project "Ximba X31" began, undergoing continuous development and being fitted with a variety of drivetrains. In 1982 Entreposto was finally able to introduce the Sado 550, a microcar with a 547 cc, two-cylinder Daihatsu AB20 engine producing 28 PS (21 kW) at 5,500 rpm. The design was by Carlos Galamba, who also designed the UMM off-roader. The Sado underwent continuous development during the production run, which consisted of Series 3, 4, and 5. Series 1 and 2 were prototypes. The initial Ximba prototypes were doorless, but tiny doors were fitted to the Series 1. Larger doors with sliding windows were fitted to the Series 2 and continued to be used on the production versions. The fifth and final series can be recognized by having been fitted with rear quarter windows.

The Sado was surprisingly popular – there was a waiting list for a period – but the economics did not add up and production ended in 1985. Around 500 were produced in this period, a few of which survive to this date.
