= Daihatsu Fellow Max =

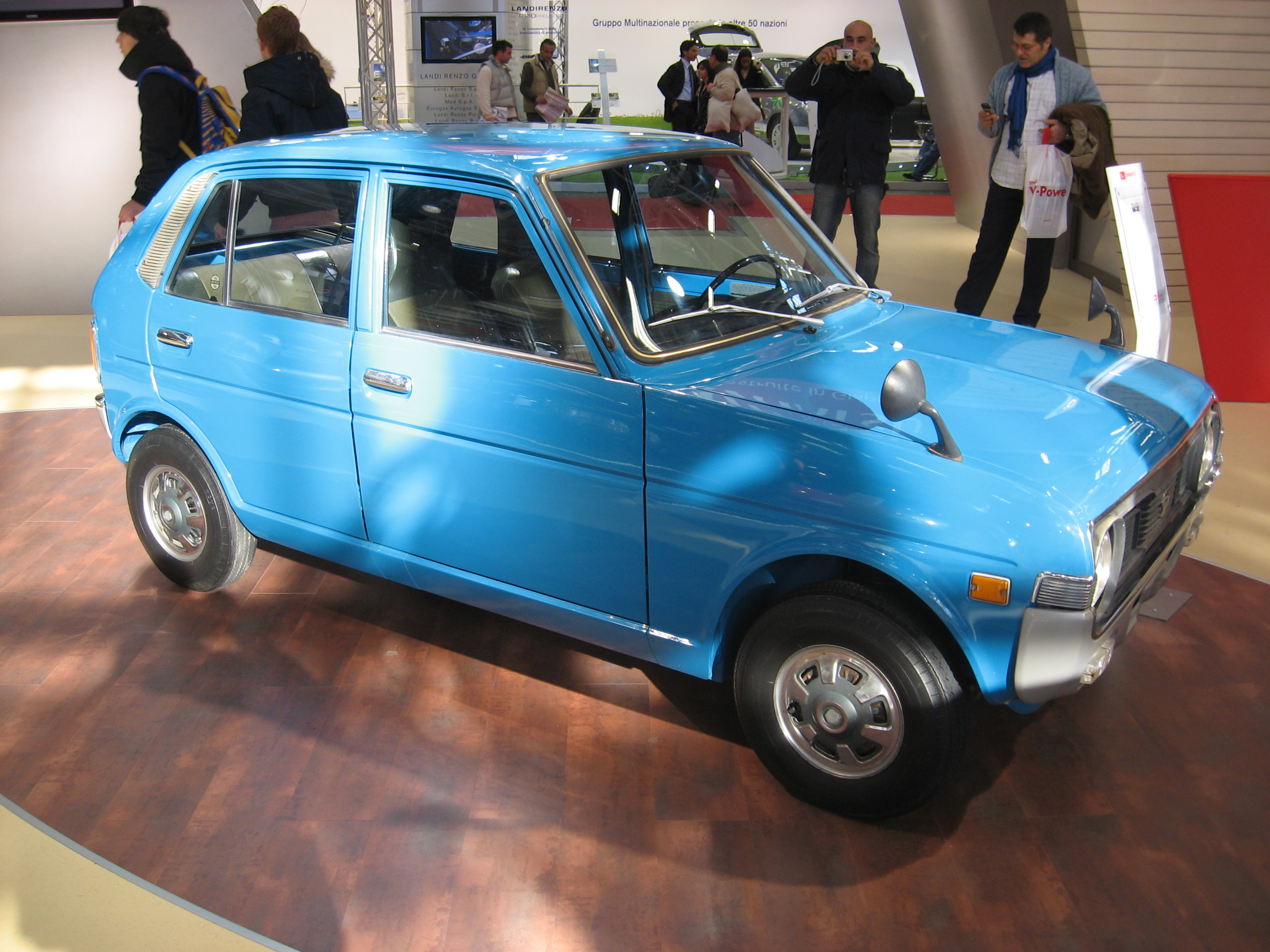
Daihatsu Fellow Max (L38; European specification car, labelled Daihatsu 360)

The Daihatsu Fellow Max is a small Japanese automobile in the Kei car class. Originally introduced as the Daihatsu Fellow, the name was partially retained for its successor, the Max Cuore (1977), and then revived in 2000 for the Daihatsu Max.

== 360cc era ==
=== Fellow ===
Daihatsu Fellow
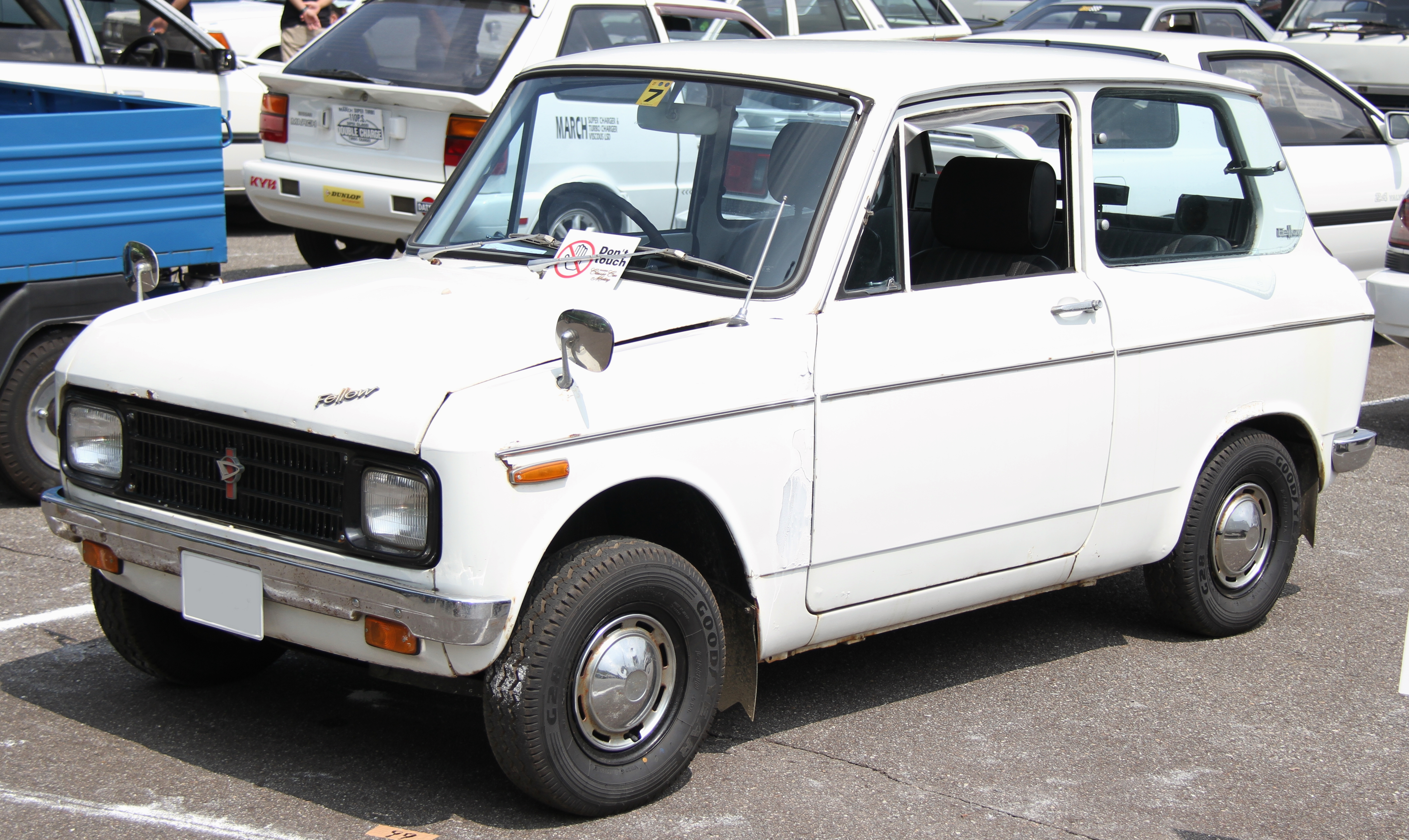
- 1969–1970 Daihatsu Fellow Custom sedan (front)

Overview
- Manufacturer: Daihatsu
- Production: 1966–1970
- Assembly: Ikeda, Osaka, Japan

Body and chassis
- Body style: 2-door sedan 2-door pickup truck 3-door van
- Layout: Front engine, rear-wheel-drive

Powertrain
- Engine: 356 cc ZM water-cooled 2-stroke I2
- Transmission: 4-speed manual

Dimensions
- Wheelbase: 1,990 mm (78.3 in)
- Length: 2,990 mm (117.7 in)
- Width: 1,285 mm (50.6 in)
- Height: 1,350 mm (53.1 in)
- Curb weight: 495 kg (1,091 lb)

On 9 November 1966, Daihatsu introduced the Fellow, also known as Daihatsu 360 in export markets. Originally available only in DeLuxe and Super DeLuxe equipment levels, a Standard version joined in February 1967. Also available with a wagon body (Fellow Van), as a mini-pickup truck and as a panel van from June 1967, the L37 was conventionally built with a front-mounted engine and rear wheel drive. It used a 23 PS iteration of the 356 cc, water-cooled two-cylinder two-stroke "ZM" engine already seen in the Hijet and a four-speed manual transmission. The self-lubricating ("Oil-Matic") little engine weighed only 58 kg (128 lb). The Fellow was the first Japanese car to be equipped with rectangular headlights.

As a result of Honda's 31 PS N360 having been introduced early in 1967, a Kei-car horsepower war broke out, with Honda, Subaru, Suzuki, Mazda, and Mitsubishi contributing competitors. Daihatsu's response, the Fellow SS, was presented at the 1967 Tokyo Motor Show in October but did not go on sale until June the next year. A Le Mans-style sportscar prototype, the P-5 with the SS engine was shown alongside. The 32 PS "SS" could do the 400 meter sprint in 21.2 seconds and had a 115 km/h (71 mph) top speed.

The Fellow also received a slight facelift in October 1967, with a new dashboard and steering wheel most noticeable. Another minor change came in January 1969, with a fixed driver's side headrest and seatbelts installed because of new safety regulations. In July, along with what was literally a facelift (the front bumper was now mounted higher), the lesser engine's output increased to 26 PS and a comparatively luxurious "Custom" version was added at the top of the lineup. The size of the taillights also increased somewhat. An electric version called the Daihatsu Fellow Van EV went on sale in September 1969.

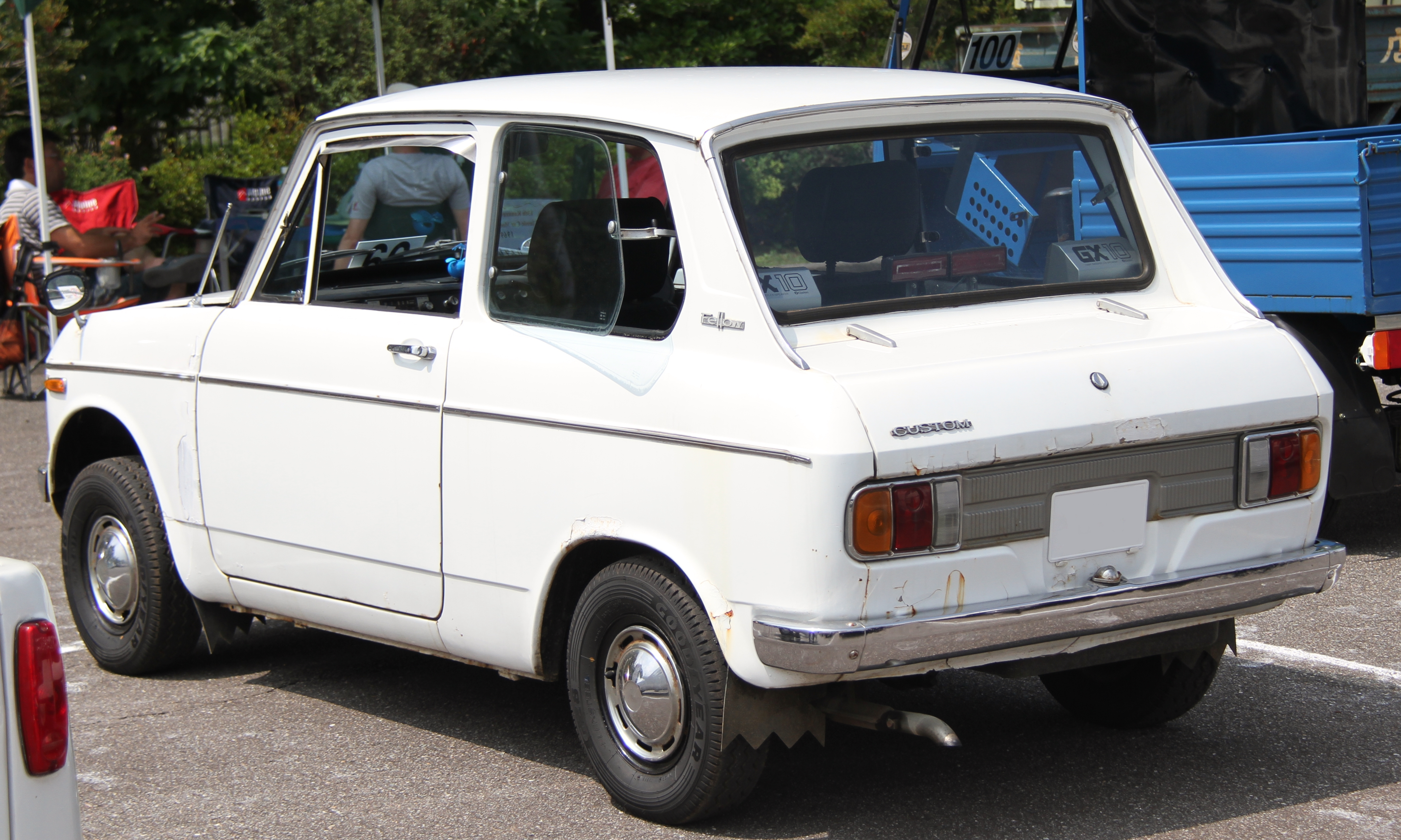
1969–1970 Daihatsu Fellow Custom sedan (rear)

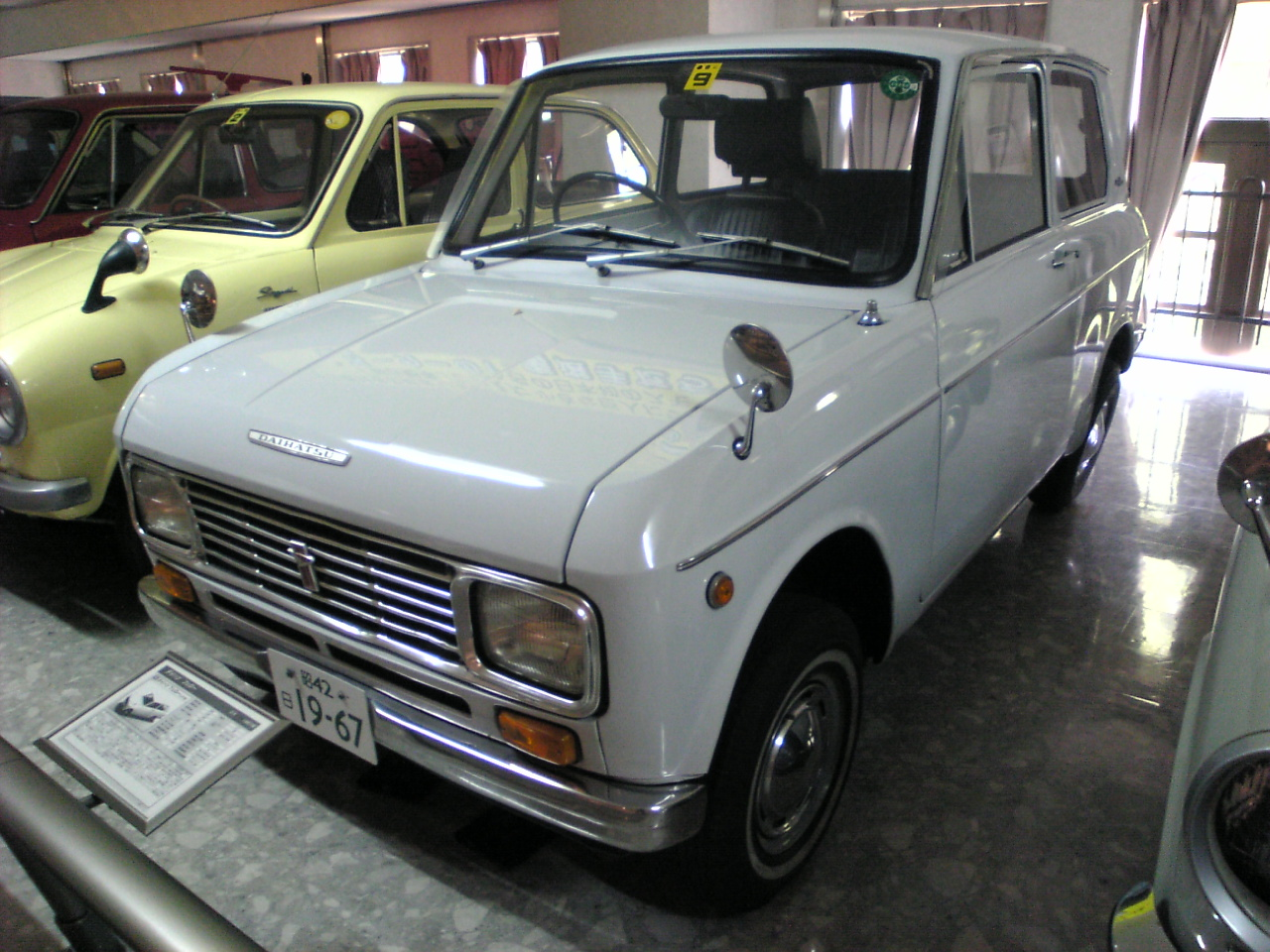
Daihatsu Fellow L37 (front)

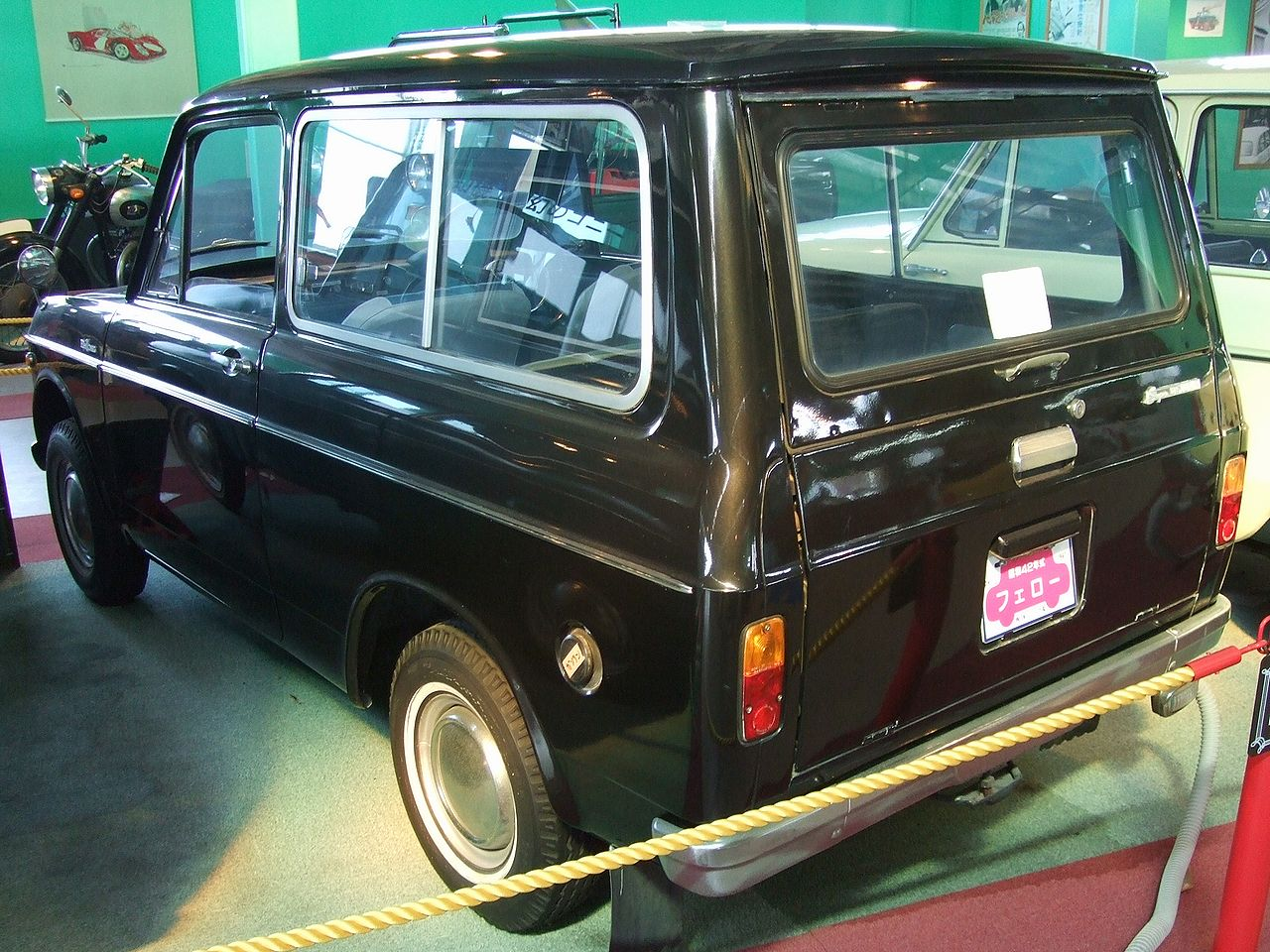
1967 Daihatsu Fellow van (rear)

Daihatsu Fellow L37 Data
Version	Engine	Power			Torque			Dimensions (mm)				Weight (kg)	Top speed (km/h)	Gears	Production		Note
Version	Engine	PS	kW	at rpm	kgm	Nm	at rpm	length	width	height	wb	Weight (kg)	Top speed (km/h)	Gears	begin	end	Note
Std, DX, SDX	Water-cooled 356 cc ZM two-cycle two-cylinder	23	17	5,000	3.5	34.3	4,000	2,990	1,285	1,350	1,990	515	100	4MT	66.11	69.07	Std. from 67.02
Std, DX, SDX, Custom	Water-cooled 356 cc ZM two-cycle two-cylinder	26	19	5,500	3.5	34.3	4,500	2,990	1,285	1,350	1,990	495	110	4MT	69.07	70.04	facelifted version
SS	Water-cooled 356 cc ZM two-cycle two-cylinder	32	23.5	6,500	3.8	37.3	5,000	2,990	1,285	1,350	1,990	495	115	4MT	68.06	70.04	
Van Std, SDX (Pickup)	Water-cooled 356 cc ZM two-cycle two-cylinder	23	17	5,000	3.5	34.3	4,000	2,995	1,295	1,430 (1,420)	1,940	545 (500)	85	4MT	67.06	69.07	300 kg (350) payload
Van Std, SDX (Pickup)	Water-cooled 356 cc ZM two-cycle two-cylinder	26	19	5,500	3.5	34.3	4,500	2,995	1,295	1,430 (1,420)	1,940	545 (500)	n/a	4MT	69.07	70.07	300 kg (350) payload

=== Fellow Buggy ===
Daihatsu Fellow Buggy
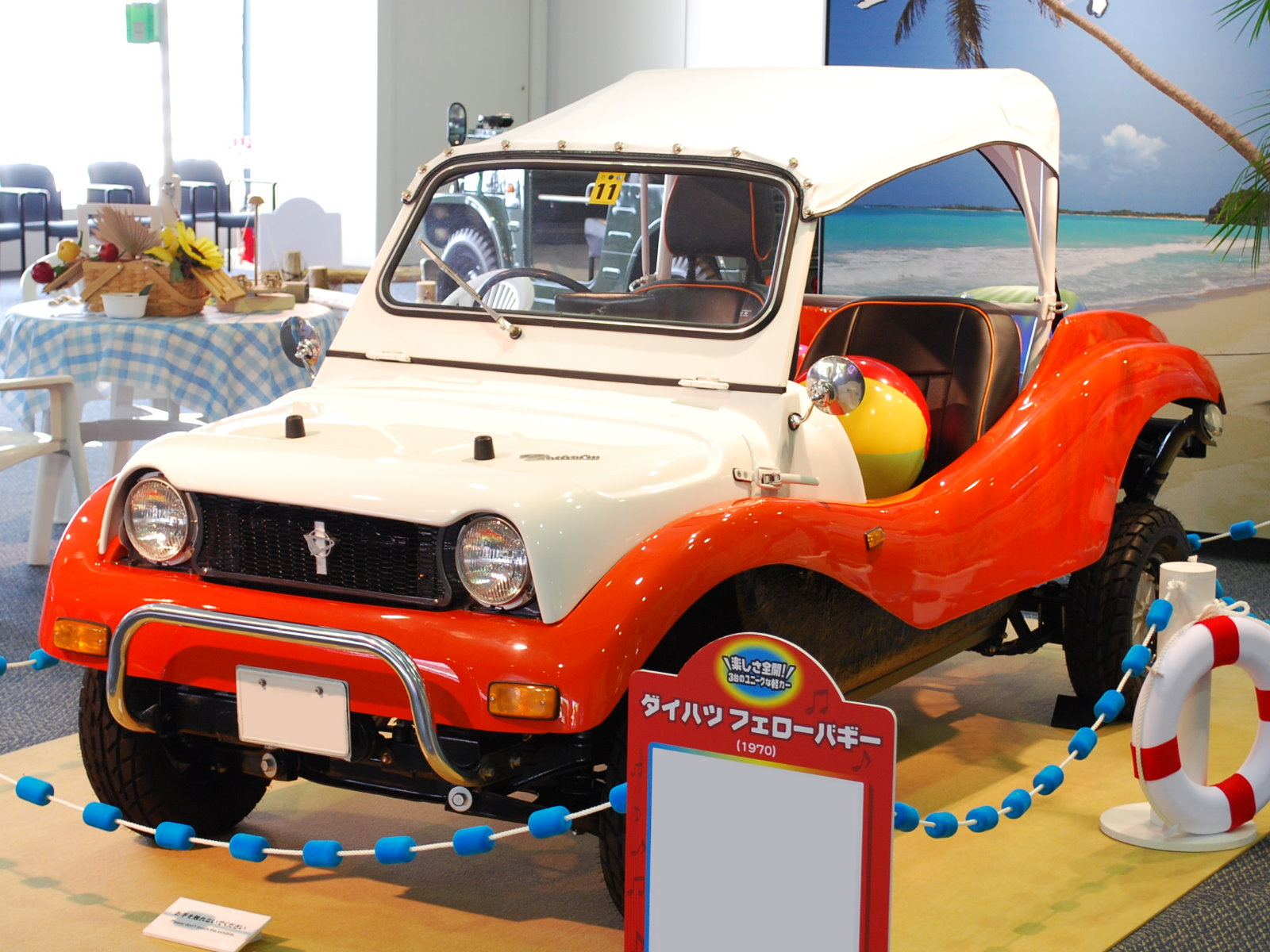
- 1970 Daihatsu Fellow Buggy (L37PB)

Overview
- Manufacturer: Daihatsu
- Production: 1970
- Assembly: Ikeda, Osaka, Japan

Body and chassis
- Body style: 2-seat beach buggy
- Layout: Front engine, rear-wheel-drive
- Related: Daihatsu Hijet S37

Powertrain
- Engine: 356 cc ZM 2-stroke I2
- Transmission: 4-speed manual

Dimensions
- Wheelbase: 1,940 mm (76.4 in)
- Length: 2,995 mm (117.9 in)
- Width: 1,290 mm (50.8 in)
- Height: 1,400 mm (55.1 in)
- Curb weight: 440 kg (970 lb)

A beach buggy version was introduced simultaneously with the other three body styles. While highly prized by collectors today, the Buggy only sold about 100 examples and was only available for a single model year. The 440 kg Fellow Buggy was not actually a "real" Fellow, as it was built on a Hijet S37 chassis, with fibre-reinforced plastic bodywork. The Buggy also used the Hijet's lower powered (26 PS or 19 kW) engine, providing a top speed of 95 km/h (59 mph).

=== Fellow Max ===
Daihatsu Fellow Max
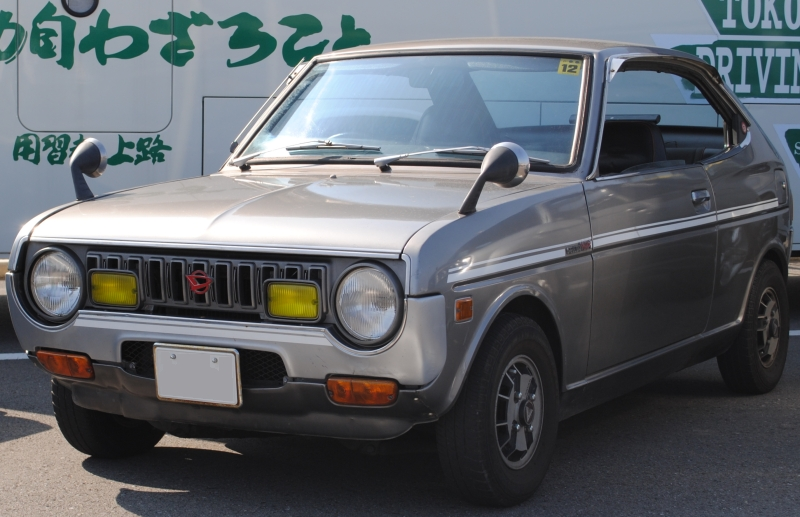
- 1973–1976 Daihatsu Fellow Max HT Coupé (L38GL)

Overview
- Manufacturer: Daihatsu
- Production: 1970–1976
- Assembly: Ikeda, Osaka, Japan

Body and chassis
- Body style: 2-door saloon 4-door saloon (from 1972); 2-door coupé (from 1971)
- Layout: Front engine, front-wheel-drive

Powertrain
- Engine: 356 cc ZM 2-stroke I2
- Transmission: 4-speed manual

Dimensions
- Wheelbase: 2,090 mm (82.3 in)
- Length: 2,995 mm (117.9 in)
- Width: 1,295 mm (51.0 in)
- Height: 1,290 mm (50.8 in)
- Curb weight: 510 kg (1,124 lb)

Chronology
- Predecessor: Daihatsu Fellow
- Successor: Daihatsu Max Cuore; Daihatsu Leeza (Hardtop)

In April 1970, the front-wheel drive L38 Daihatsu Fellow Max was introduced to replace the rear-wheel drive Fellow. Originally, only available as a two-door sedan and three-door van (L38V). In March 1971, the headlights are replaced with round headlights. A hardtop coupé with a lower roofline and a somewhat baroque front-end treatment was added in August 1971 (L38GL). SL and GXL Hardtops received standard front disc brakes. In October 1972 a four-door version (L38F) appeared; it was the only four-door Kei car at the time of its introduction. Dimensions were 2,995 mm × 1,295 mm as dictated by the Kei car regulations, although the wheelbase was stretched by 100 mm to 2,090 mm. The engine was a 360 cc two-cylinder two-stroke ("ZM4"), offering 33 PS (24 kW) at the time of introduction. In July 1970 the SS version appeared, featuring a twin-carb, 40 PS (SAE) version of the ZM engine (ZM5) - a specific output of over 112 PS per litre. Top speed was 120 km/h, compared to 115 km/h (75 and 71 mph) for the lesser versions. This highly tuned engine had an 11:1 compression ratio, versus 10:1 for the ZM4 engine, and required high octane gasoline. With a narrow powerband at the high end of the range, its expansion chambers in the front and rear meant that noise levels were elevated.

In October 1972, the engine outputs dropped somewhat, to 31 and 37 PS respectively to lower fuel consumption and meet new, more stringent emissions standards. These engines were called ZM12 and ZM13 respectively.

In export markets, this car was usually sold simply as the "Daihatsu 360". In Australia, where the car went on sale in early 1972 as a two-door sedan, it was called the Max 360X. It was the cheapest new car available in Australia at the time. Unaffected by emissions regulations, it was equipped with the 33 PS version of the engine; in a period road test by Wheels magazine it reached 68 mph (109 km/h) and managed the sprint to 60 mph (97 km/h) in 33.2 seconds. It was also sold as the Daihatsu 360X in New Zealand.

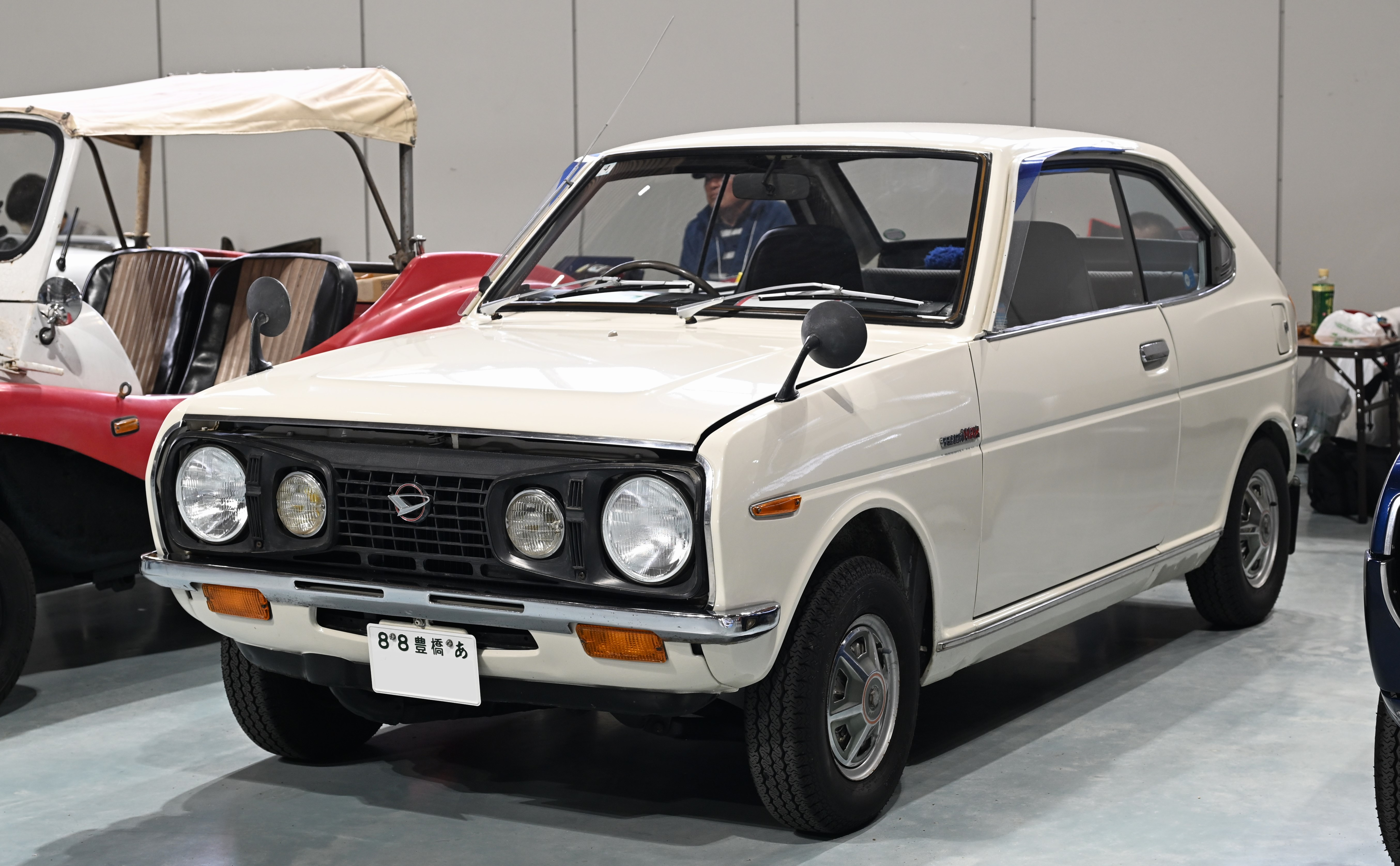
First facelift Fellow Max

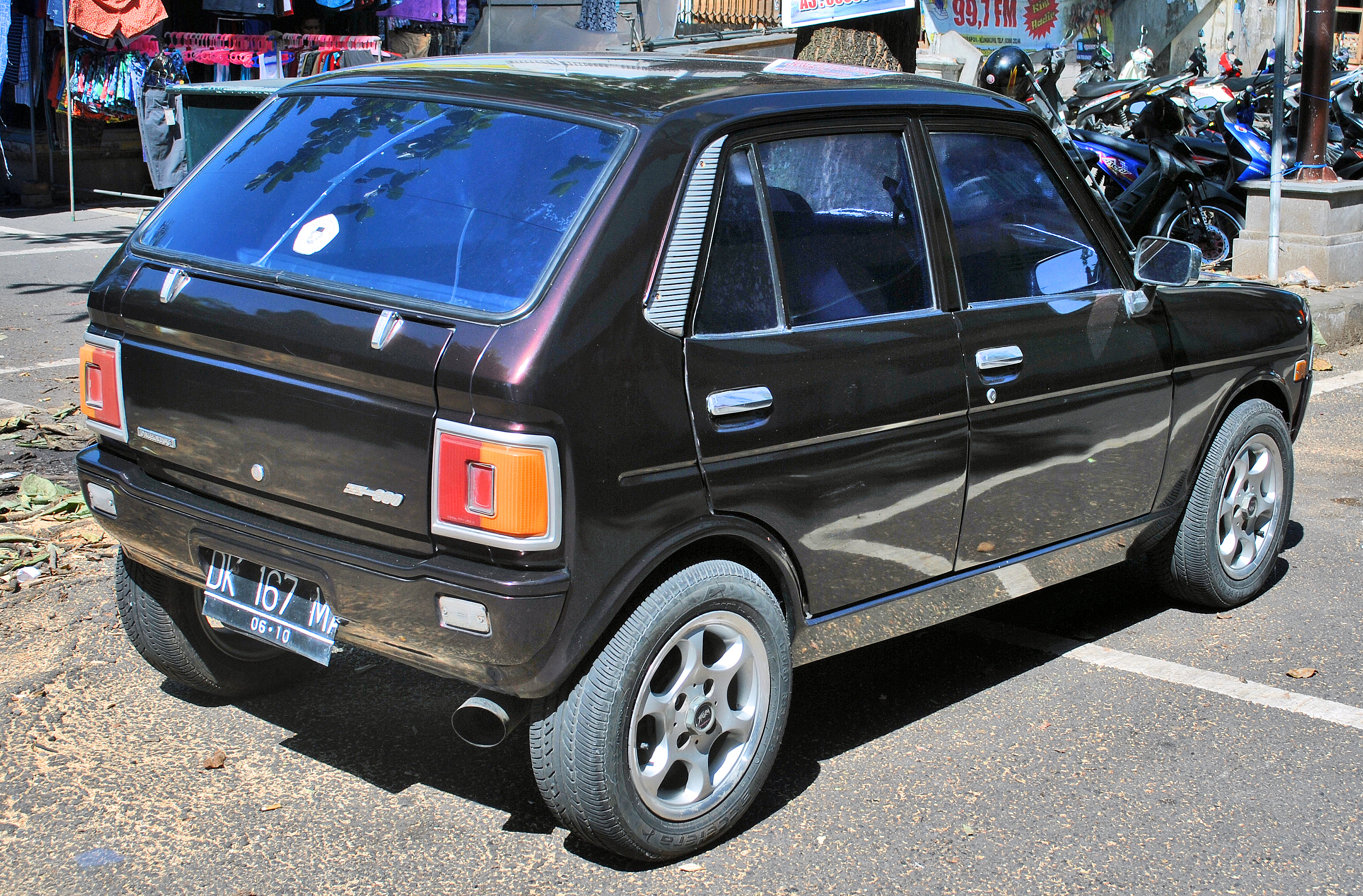
1973–1976 Daihatsu Fellow Max 4-door sedan

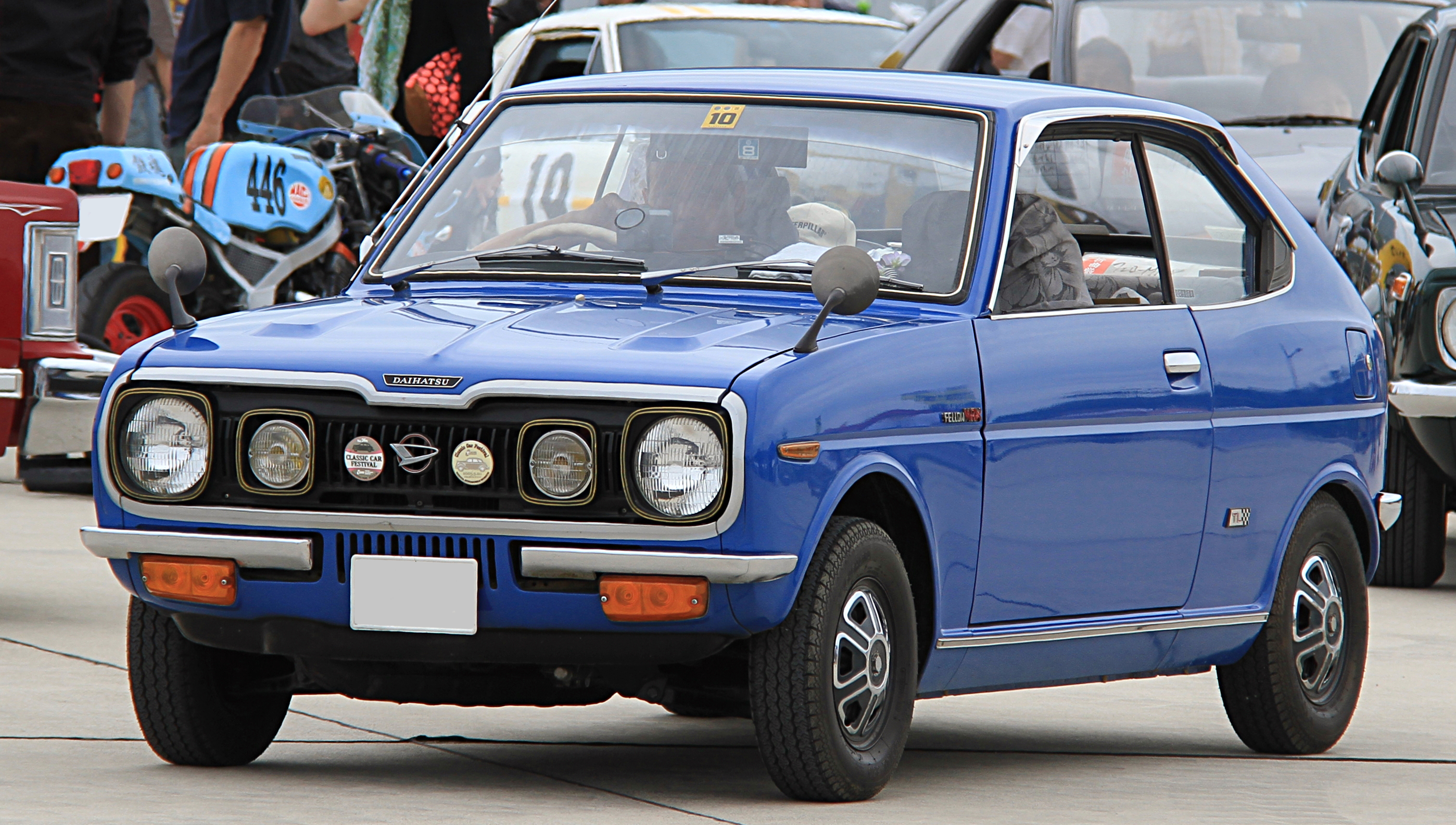
1971–1973 Daihatsu Fellow Max Hardtop TL

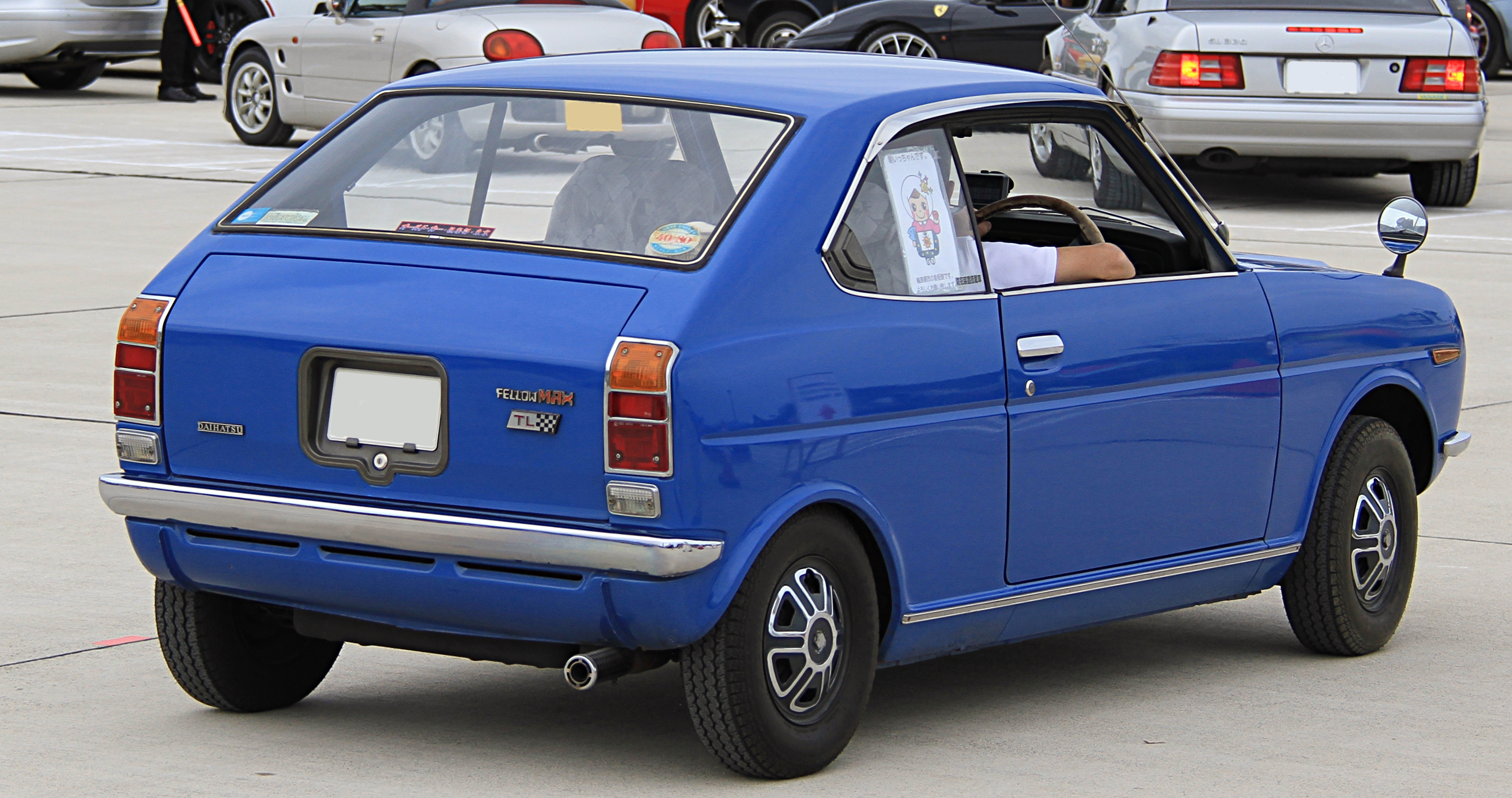
1971–1973 Fellow Max Hardtop TL, rear view

The Fellow Max received a steady stream of facelifts during its existence. It underwent minor changes in March 1971 (new grille, dash modifications), March 1972 (new dash, round headlights and a new bonnet with longitudinal creases), May 1973 (changes to the fenders and new bumpers that fitted into the bodywork, and another new bonnet) and in October 1973 (new safety equipment). In February 1975 the bumpers were modified again, to allow for the fitment of new, larger license plates. The grille and front bumper arrangement was changed yet again. At the same time the interior saw some changes and the powerful twin-carb model was dropped as it wouldn't pass new emissions regulations. From now on, all models were equipped with the 31 PS "ZM12" engine. In May 1976 the car underwent more thorough changes as new Kei car regulations were introduced. This also marked the end of the Hardtop versions, which anyhow had lost relevance once the twin-carb engine was discontinued.

== 550cc era ==
Daihatsu Fellow Max/Max Cuore
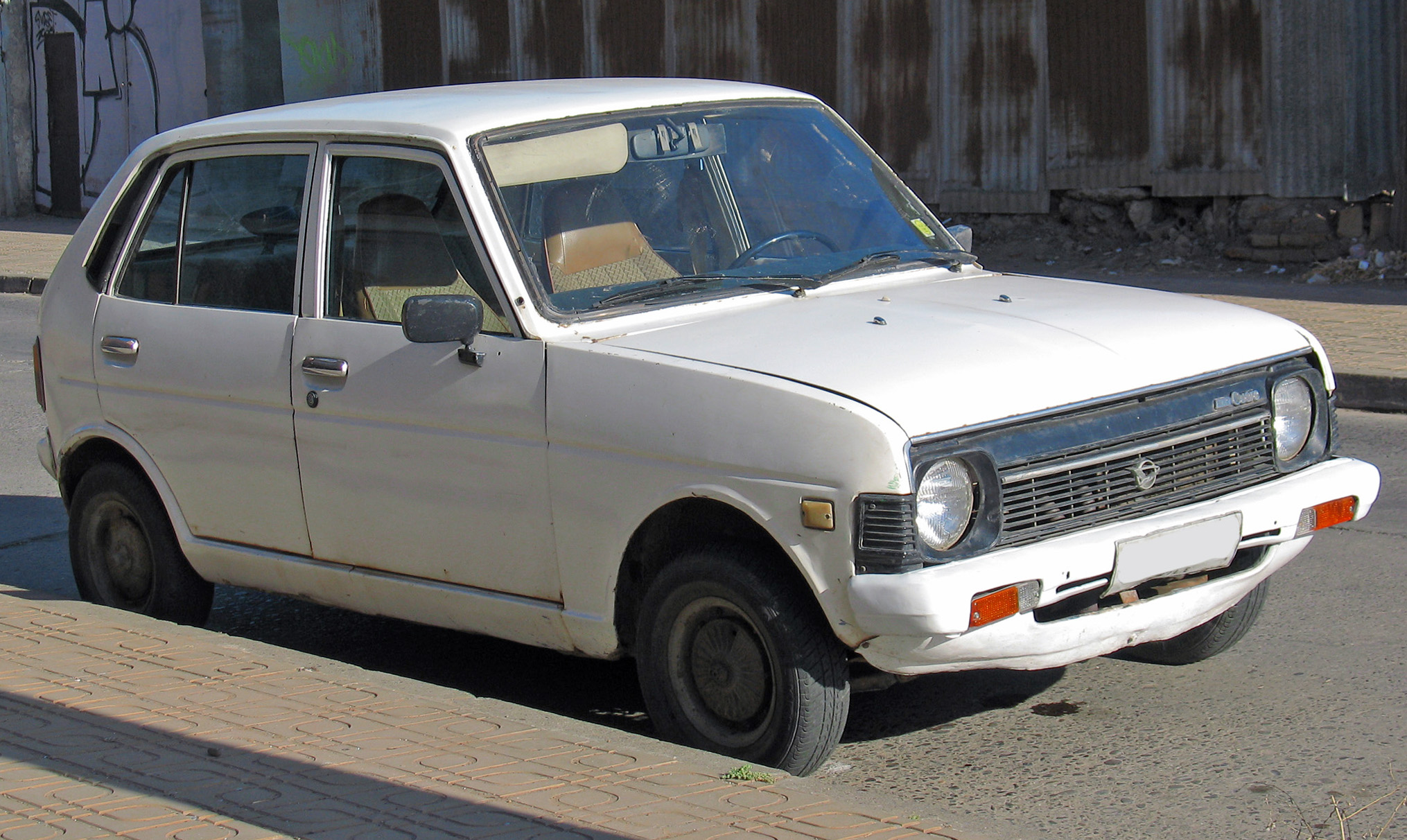
- 1981 Daihatsu Max Cuore four-door

Overview
- Manufacturer: Daihatsu
- Also called: Daihatsu Max 550 (Japan; 1976–1977); Daihatsu Cuore
- Production: 1976–1980
- Assembly: Ikeda, Osaka, Japan

Body and chassis
- Class: Kei car
- Body style: 2/4-door sedan 3-door van
- Layout: Front engine, front-wheel-drive
- Platform: L40, L45 platforms

Powertrain
- Engine: 547 cc AB10/30 I2
- Transmission: 4-speed manual

Dimensions
- Wheelbase: 2,090 mm (82.3 in)
- Length: 3,120–3,165 mm (122.8–124.6 in)
- Width: 1,305–1,395 mm (51.4–54.9 in)
- Height: 1,320 mm (52.0 in)
- Curb weight: 535–565 kg (1,179–1,246 lb)

Chronology
- Successor: Daihatsu Mira

In May 1976, responding to a change in the Kei car regulations, Daihatsu increased the Fellow Max' engine size to 547 cc and gave it a new chassis code (L40/L40V). The name remained, although the "Fellow" portion received less prominence and some marketing material simply referred to the car as the "Max 550". The new "AB10" four-stroke two-cylinder engine replaced the old two-cycle "ZM". This, developed with help from Toyota, was an overhead camshaft design (belt-driven) which also featured balance axles to smoothen the inherently imbalanced two-cylinder design. The AB10 engine was also briefly sold to Suzuki for use in the four-stroke version of their Fronte 7-S. The cleaner four-stroke offered less power than the revvy 360, down to 28 PS (21 kW) at 6,000 rpm. Torque increased somewhat, to 3.9 kg⋅m (38 N⋅m) at a significantly lower 3,500 rpm.

New bumpers meant length and width were up marginally to 3,120 mm (122.8 in) and 1,305 mm (51.4 in). Claimed top speed was 110 km/h (68 mph), somewhat lower than that of the 360. With Honda withdrawing from the Kei passenger car segment, Daihatsu became the only maker to offer a Kei car featuring front-wheel drive. The Van used the front end and front doors from the two-door Max, but with a more square-rigged rear end featuring a split tailgate (divided horizontally) and a folding rear seat which allowed for a flat loading floor.

=== Max Cuore ===
In July 1977, the name was changed to Max Cuore (chassis code L45, although Vans remained L40V). The new name also heralded a wider body shell (up to 1,395 mm or 54.9 in) which also increased the length to 3160 mm for the sedan and 3165 mm for the wagon. By March, 1979 the car was renamed Daihatsu Cuore (though it still carried discrete "Max" badging), along with a power upgrade to 31 PS (23 kW) at 6000 rpm. Torque increased to 4.2 kg⋅m (41 N⋅m) for the engine, which now featured the DECS (Daihatsu Economical Clean-up System) emissions control system to meet the stricter 1978 (53年) emissions standards. The front grille and emblems were changed, while the seats were improved and new colors (inside and out) became available. The Cuore Van, available in Standard, DeLuxe, and Super DeLuxe grades, now had 29 PS (21 kW) on tap.

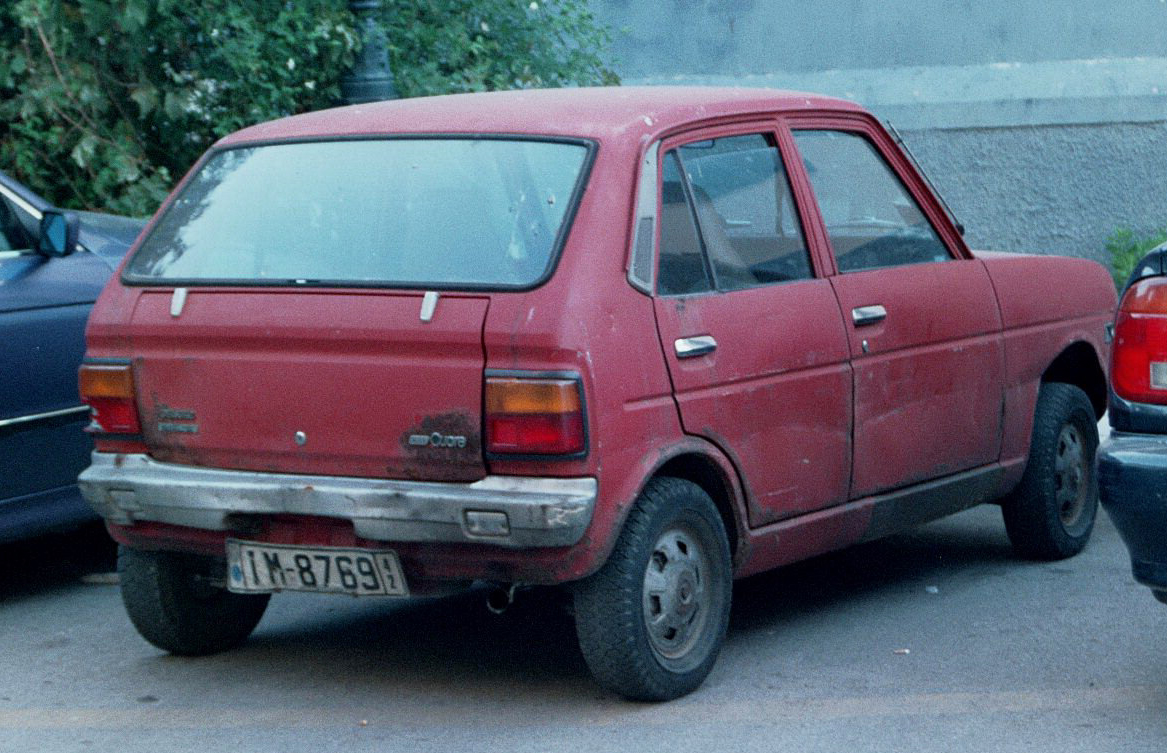
Rear view

In most of Europe, the car was simply called Daihatsu Cuore beginning in 1977, although it retained the "Max" prefix in some markets. Export versions received the same lower-powered engine as the Cuore Van did in Japan. 1980 saw the introduction of the parallel commercial series Daihatsu Mira, while the name "Max" finally disappeared entirely from the Cuore. In Japan, the 1979 Max Cuore was available as Standard (two-door), Deluxe (two or four doors), Custom (four-door), Hi-Custom (two or four doors), and Hi-Custom EX (four-door). The top of the line Hi-Custom EX was new for 1979.

== Daihatsu Max (2001) ==
Daihatsu Max (L950/952/960/962S)
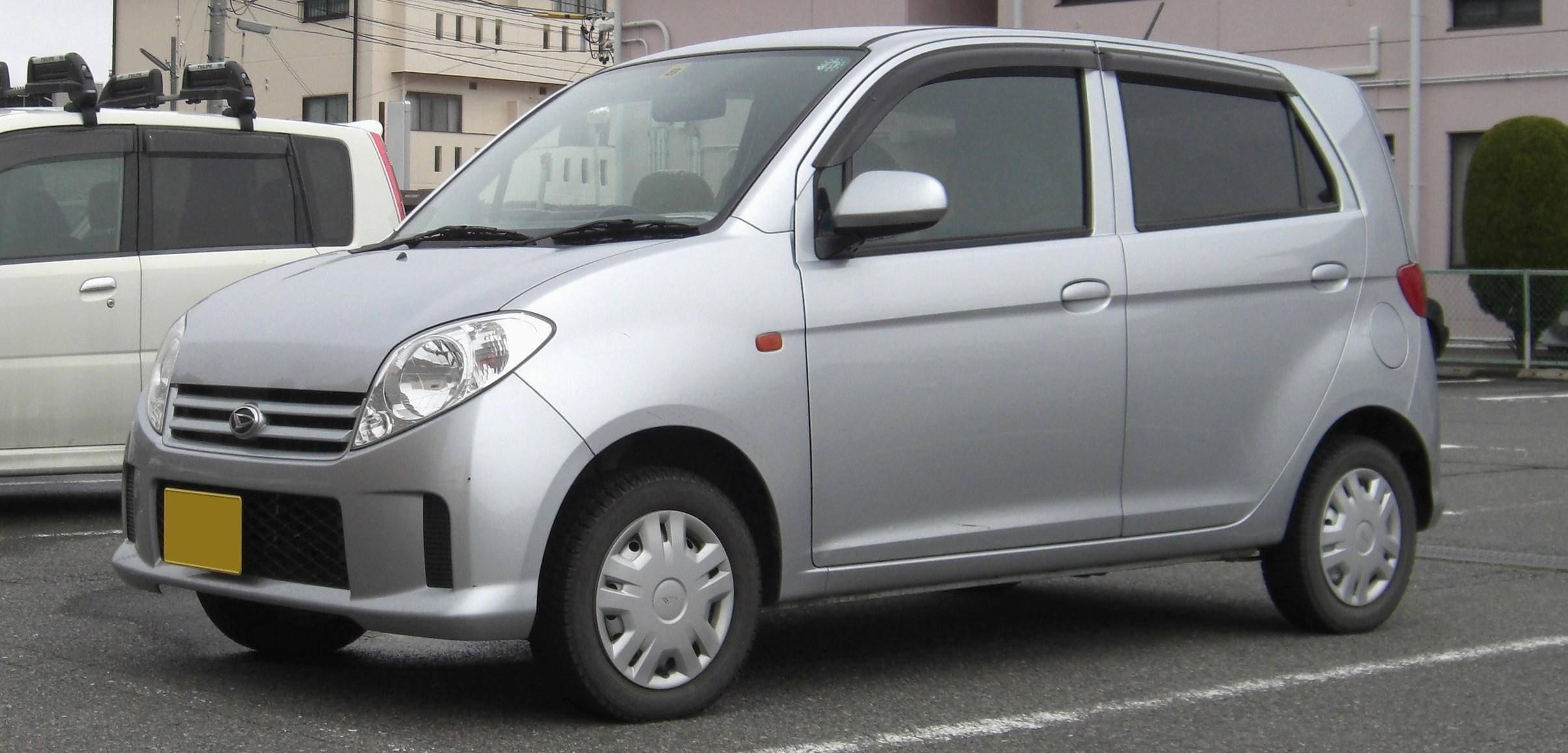
- 2003 Daihatsu Max

Overview
- Manufacturer: Daihatsu
- Production: November 2001 – December 2005
- Assembly: Ikeda, Osaka, Japan

Body and chassis
- Class: Kei car
- Body style: 5-door hatchback
- Layout: Front engine, front-wheel-drive or four-wheel-drive
- Related: Daihatsu Move (L900)

Powertrain
- Engine: 659 cc EF-VE I3; 659 cc EF-DET turbo I3; 659 cc JB-DET turbo I4
- Transmission: 5-speed manual 4-speed automatic CVT

Dimensions
- Wheelbase: 2,360 mm (92.9 in)
- Length: 3,395 mm (133.7 in)
- Width: 1,305–1,475 mm (51.4–58.1 in)
- Height: 1,550 mm (61.0 in)
- Curb weight: 800–870 kg (1,760–1,920 lb)

Chronology
- Successor: Daihatsu Sonica

The Daihatsu Max was a partial revival of the Daihatsu Fellow Max nameplate, appearing on October 10, 2001. Sales of the Daihatsu Max 5-door wagon began on November 1, using the same technical data as the second generation Move, though 10 mm lower. In 2006, the Max was discontinued and replaced by the Sonica.

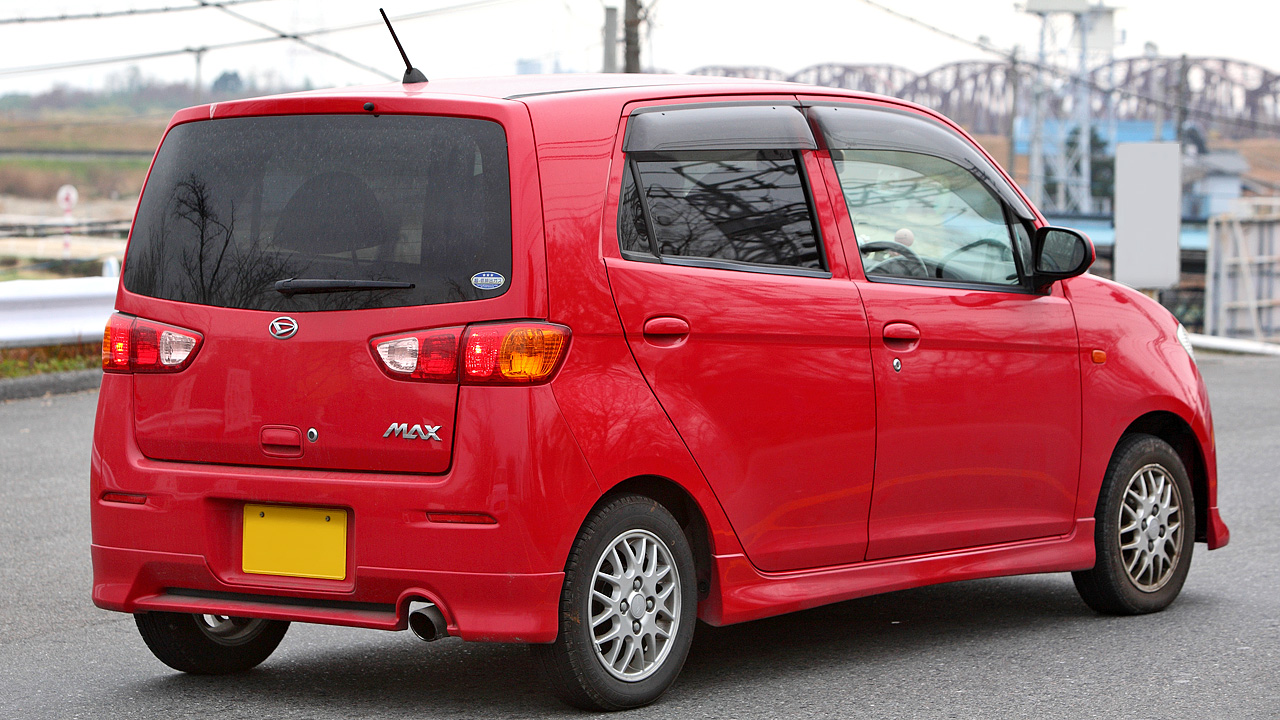
Rear view
