= Daihatsu Sonica =

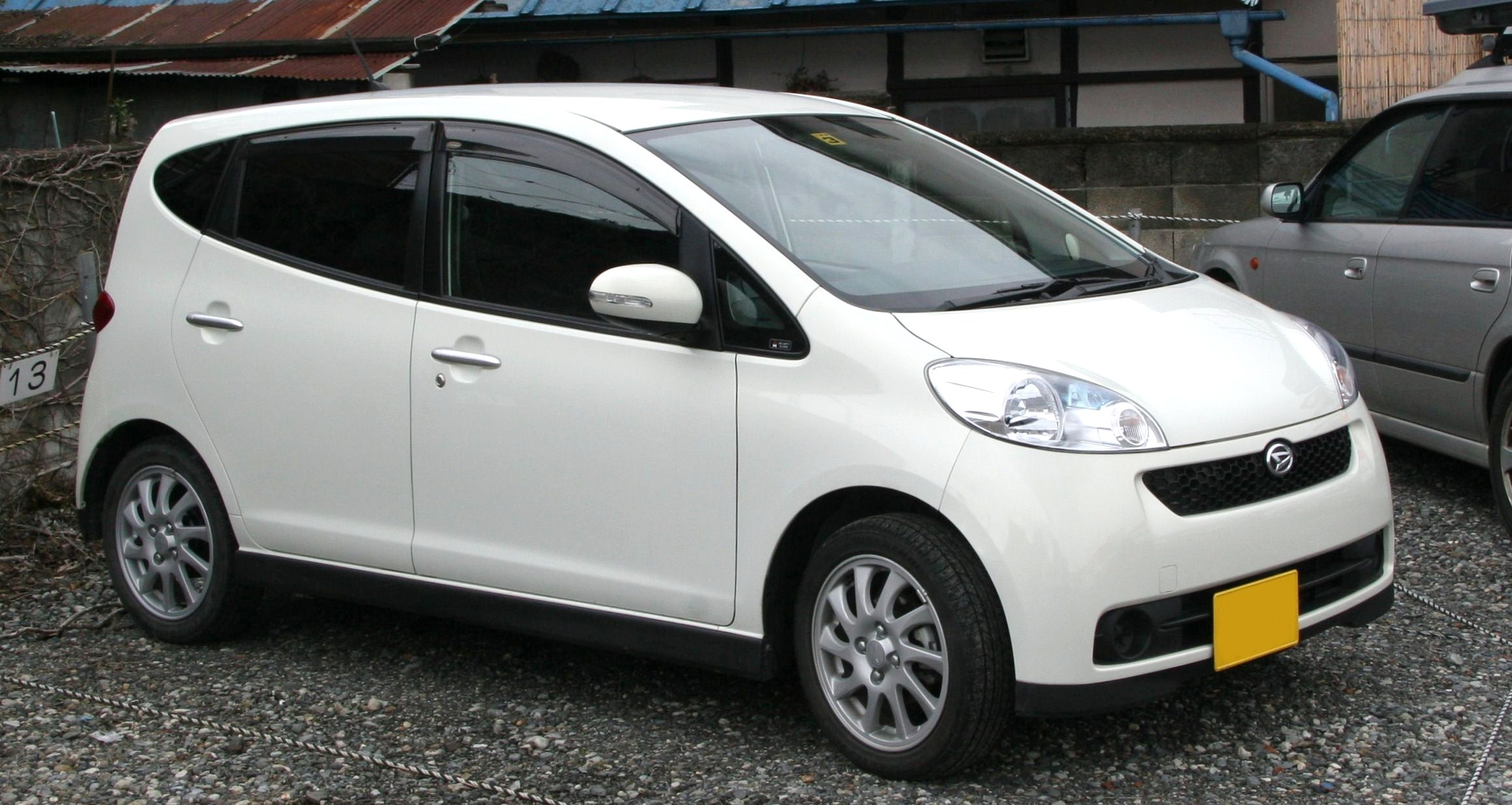
- 2006–2007 Daihatsu Sonica

Overview
- Manufacturer: Daihatsu
- Model code: L405S
- Production: June 2006 – April 2009
- Assembly: Japan: Nakatsu, Ōita (Daihatsu Motor Kyushu)
- Designer: Morinobu Okano and Takahiko Koyama

Body and chassis
- Class: Kei car
- Body style: 5-door hatchback
- Layout: Front-engine, front-wheel-drive; Front-engine, four-wheel-drive

Powertrain
- Engine: Petrol: 658 cc KF-DET turbo I3
- Power output: 47 kW (63 hp; 64 PS)
- Transmission: CVT

Dimensions
- Wheelbase: 2,440 mm (96.1 in)
- Length: 3,395 mm (133.7 in)
- Width: 1,475 mm (58.1 in)
- Height: 1,470 mm (57.9 in)
- Kerb weight: 820–870 kg (1,808–1,918 lb)

Chronology
- Predecessor: Daihatsu Max
- Successor: Daihatsu Cast Sport

The Daihatsu Sonica (Japanese: ダイハツ・ソニカ, Hepburn: Daihatsu Sonika) is a kei car produced by the Japanese automobile manufacturer Daihatsu that was sold between 2006 and 2009.

The production of the vehicle began in 2006, after having revealed it as a concept car named "SK Tourer" earlier in the same year. It was available in three grade levels: R, RS and RS Limited. The Sonica was discontinued in September 2009.

The name "Sonica" is derived from the word "sonic".

In May 2007 the Sonica received a facelift. The main changes include the adoption of a chrome front grille , body-coloured lower bumper and side stone guards for RS, changes to the seat upholstery, and changes to the interior color. In terms of equipment, 14-inch aluminium wheels are standard on the R model, 6 speakers are standard on the RS Limited.

The Sonica struggled amid the popularity of light passenger cars, such as the Move. In 2008 sales the Sonica fell by 37% compared to the previous year to approximately 3,880 units.

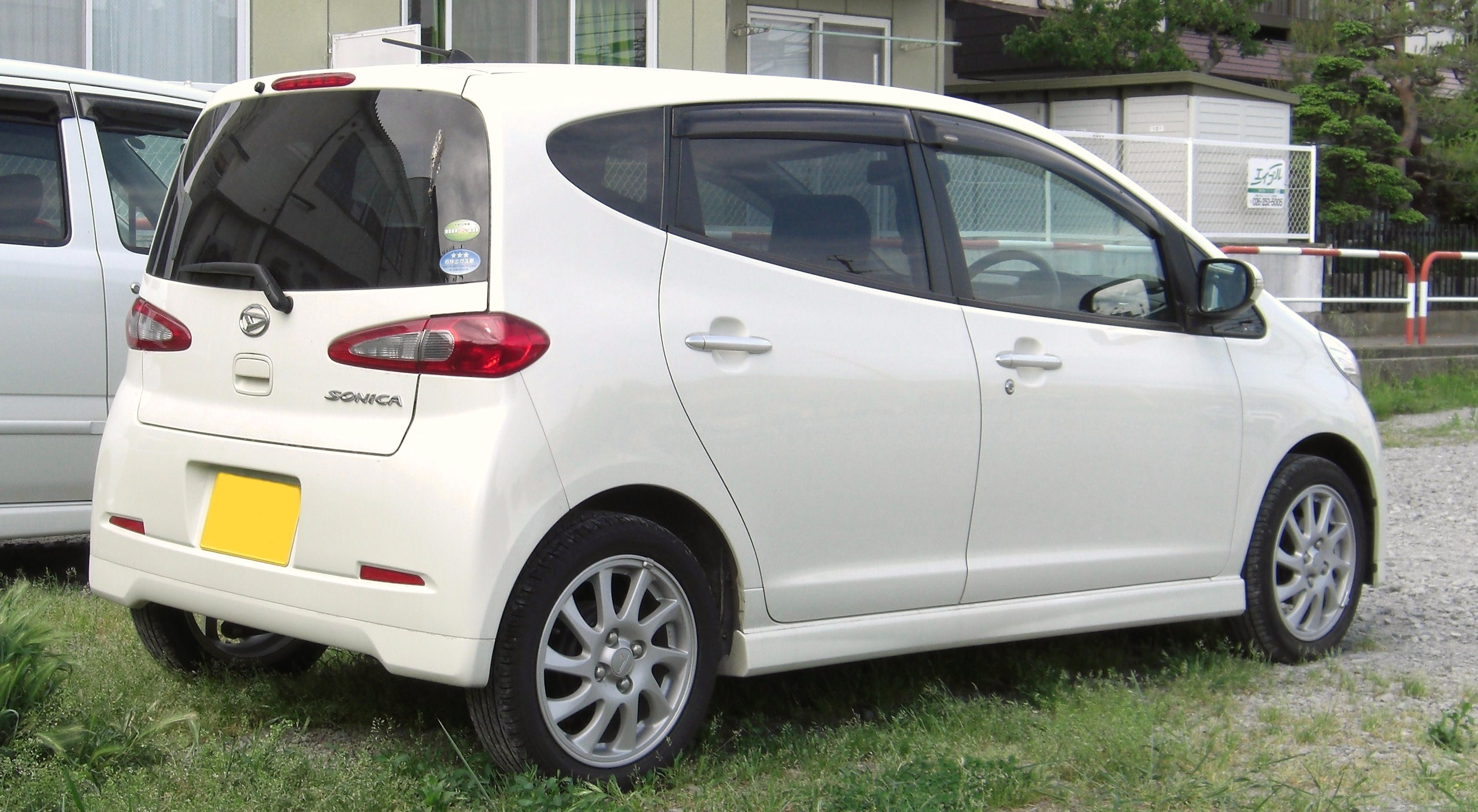
Rear view

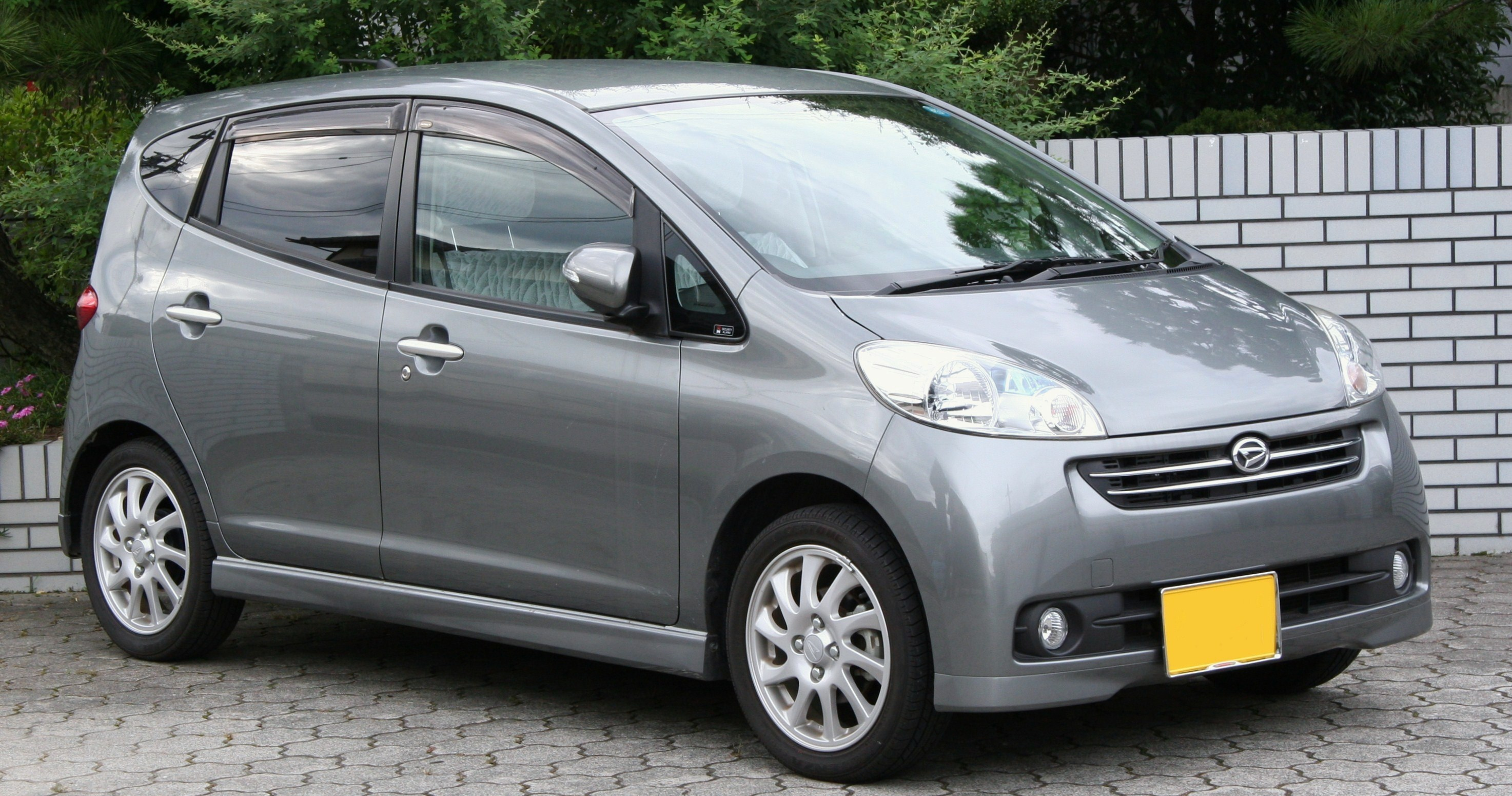
2007–2009 Sonica
