= Daihatsu A-series engine =

The Daihatsu A-series engine is a range of compact two-cylinder internal combustion piston engines, designed by Daihatsu with the aid of their owner Toyota. Petrol-driven, it has cast iron engine blocks and aluminum cylinder heads, which are of a single overhead cam lean burn design with belt-driven camshafts. The head design was called "TGP lean-burn", for "Turbulence Generating Pot". The engine also had twin balancing shafts, which provided smoothness equivalent to that of a traditional four-cylinder engine - although it also cost nearly as much to build.

The engine was developed with some haste in order to replace the two-stroke "ZM" engines used in Daihatsu's earlier Kei cars, and was the first unit to take full advantage of the new 550 cc displacement limit in effect from 1 January 1976. It was first presented in May 1976 as the AB10. Eventually, even a turbocharged version was produced. The engine was replaced by the three-cylinder EB-series in 1985.

== AB-series (547 cc) ==
The AB-series is a 547 cc (0.55 L) version, originally installed in the 1976 Fellow Max 550 but was eventually used in Daihatsu's entire Kei car lineup. Bore is 71.6 mm and stroke is 68 mm. Unlike export versions, Japanese-market engines have a small catalyzer fitted. The engine (AB20) was also installed in the Portuguese Entreposto Sado 550 citycar, of which about 500 were built in the early 1980s. Daihatsu's close competitor, Suzuki, fitted AB10 engines into their Fronte 7-S for a short period, as their own two-stroke engines could not meet increasingly-strict emissions requirements. Suzuki did not buy complete engines, with 43 percent in-house content (by price); the blocks, however, still carried Daihatsu logos and "AB10" stampings.

Engines designed to be installed in an upright position are denoted AB10, while those intended for a horizontal position (for underfloor usage) are called AB20. The AB55 is a horizontal version equipped with a turbocharger. A downtuned version with 9 PS (6.6 kW) at 2900 rpm and 2.8 kg⋅m (27 N⋅m; 20 lb⋅ft) at 2000 rpm was installed in Toyota's 500 kg (1,100 lb) FG5 forklift from the late 1970s.

Applications:

- 1976.05–1977.06 Daihatsu Fellow Max 550 (L40/L40V)
- 1977.06–1980.06 Daihatsu Max Cuore/Cuore (L45/L40V)
- 1980.06–1985.08 Daihatsu Cuore/Mira (L55/L55V)
- 1976.04–1980.04 Daihatsu Hijet (S40)
- 1977.04–1981.04 Daihatsu Hijet (S60)
- 1982–1984 Sado 550 (Portugal)
- 1977.06–1978 Suzuki Fronte 7-S (SS11)

Name and layout		Power			Torque				Norm	Comp.	Fuel system	Cat	Fitment	Notes
Name and layout		PS	kW	at rpm	kgm	Nm	lbft	at rpm	Norm	Comp.	Fuel system	Cat	Fitment	Notes
AB-10	4V SOHC	28	21	6000	3.9	38	28	3500	JIS	8.7	carb	●	Fellow Max 550 (L40/L40V), Max Cuore (L45/L40V), Suzuki Fronte 7-S (SS11)	
AB-30	4V SOHC	29	21	6000	4.0	39	29	3500	JIS	9.2	carb	–	Cuore Van (L40V), [Max] Cuore (L40, export) Mira/Mira Cuore (L55V)	Commercials and export models
AB-30	4V SOHC	26	19	6000	3.8	37	27	3500	DIN	9.2	carb	–	Cuore Van (L40V), [Max] Cuore (L40, export) Mira/Mira Cuore (L55V)	Commercials and export models
AB-30	4V SOHC	31	23	6000	4.2	41	30	3500	JIS	9.2	carb	●	Cuore (L45), Cuore (L55)	
AB-31	4V SOHC	30	22	6000	4.2	41	30	3500	JIS	9.2	carb	?	Mira/Mira Cuore (L55V)	
AB-??	4V SOHC	27	20	6000	4.5	44	33	3500	DIN	9.2	carb	–	Cuore Van (L40V), Mira/Mira Cuore (L55V)	Export version
AB-35	4V SOHC	41	30	6000	5.7	56	41	2500	JIS	8.2	turbo	–	Mira Turbo (L55V)	IHI turbocharger
AB-20	4V SOHC	28	21	5500	4.0	39	29	3500	JIS	9.2	carb	–	Hijet 550 (S40), Hijet Wide 550 (S60), Sado 550	
AB-20	4V SOHC	28	21	5500	4.2	41	30	3500	JIS	9.2	carb	–	Hijet 550 (S65/66), Hijet Atrai (S65/66), 81.04-82.03	
AB-20	4V SOHC	29	21	5500	4.5	44	33	3500	JIS	9.2	carb	–	Hijet 550 (S65/66, 82.04-??)	
AB-50	4V SOHC	29	21	5500	4.4	43	32	3500	JIS		carb	●	Hijet Atrai (S65/66, 82.04-83.09)	horizontally mounted, passenger car emissions
AB-51	4V SOHC	29	21	5300	4.5	44	33	3500	JIS		carb	●	Atrai (S65/66, 83.09-86.03)	modified carb, advanced ignition
AB-55	4V SOHC	39	29	5500/5300	5.9	58	43	3000	JIS		turbo	●	Atrai Turbo (S65/66, 83.10-86.03)	max power at lower rpm from 1984.02

== AD-series (617 cc) ==
The AD-series is a 617 cc (0.62 L) version of the AB-series engine. Due to its larger size, it does not meet Kei car regulations; it was intended only for export markets. Of Daihatsu products, only the Cuore (often called "Domino" in export markets) was fitted with this engine. Bore is 76 mm and stroke is 68 mm. The only version was an SOHC, two-valve, single carburetted unit. Innocenti also built this engine into their Mini 650, built from November 1984 until November 1987.

== See also ==
- List of Toyota engines
