= Daihatsu Mira =

Kei car/city car

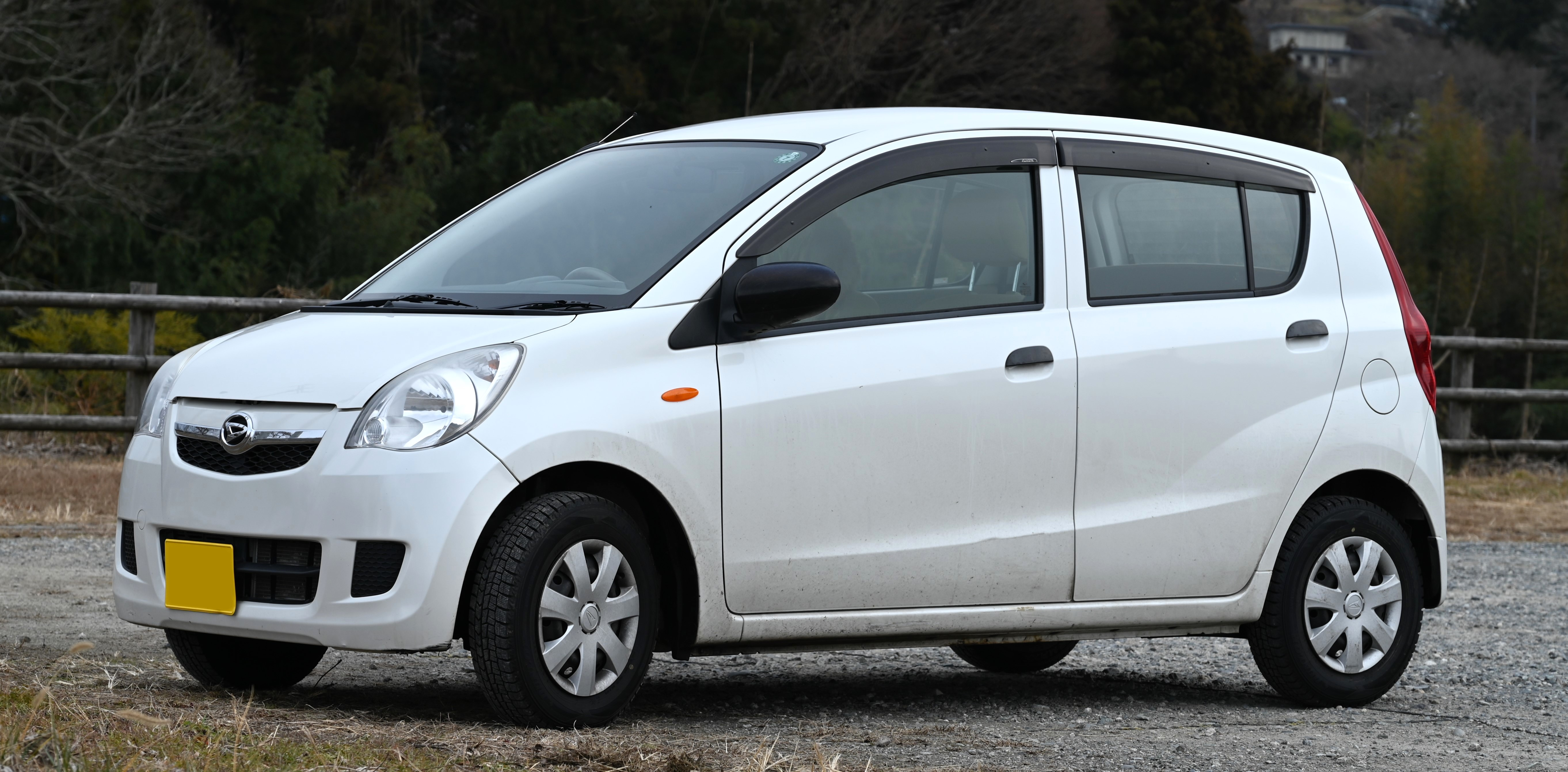
- Seventh generation Daihatsu Mira

Overview
- Manufacturer: Daihatsu
- Also called: Daihatsu Cuore; Daihatsu Charade; Daihatsu Domino; Daihatsu Handivan
- Production: June 1980 – March 2018
- Assembly: Ikeda, Osaka, Japan

Body and chassis
- Class: Kei car (A)
- Layout: Front-engine, front-wheel-drive / four-wheel-drive
- Related: Daihatsu Leeza; Daihatsu Move; Daihatsu Opti; Perodua Kancil; Perodua Kelisa; Perodua Viva

Chronology
- Predecessor: Daihatsu Max Cuore
- Successor: Daihatsu Mira e:S (passenger car); Daihatsu Hijet Caddie (van); Daihatsu Ayla (Cuore/Charade, indirect); Daihatsu Mira Tocot (passenger car)

The Daihatsu Mira (also known as the Cuore, Domino, and more recently Charade) was a kei-type city car built by Japanese car maker Daihatsu. It was built with a variety of options and chassis variations, with the latest variant having four models: Mira, Mira AVY, Mira Gino, and Mira VAN. The Mira is the latest successor to the line of cars begun with the Daihatsu Fellow of 1966, and was originally introduced as the commercial version of the Cuore. Outside of Japan, the Mira has also been offered with larger 850 or 1000-cc engines. In Australia, the two-seater version was marketed as the Daihatsu Handivan and later as the Daihatsu Handi. The term mira means "look (at)" in Spanish and "goal" or "purpose" in Latin.

== History ==
The Daihatsu Mira and Cuore replaced the Daihatsu Max Cuore in July 1980. This was replaced by the second generation (L70) of the Mira/Cuore, which was introduced in 1985. For most generations, two engine sizes were available, one smaller version, to suit Japanese domestic regulations of either 550 or 660 cc, and a bigger-engined version for export markets. The L200 variant (1990–94), for instance, came with a three-cylinder 660-cc engine with 40–64 PS (29–47 kW) in Japan, while other parts of the world received a stronger variant with an 847- or 1000-cc engine. The L500 Mira was the first kei car from Daihatsu to offer a four-cylinder (660-cc) engine.

== L55/L60 series (1980) ==
Daihatsu Mira L55/L60
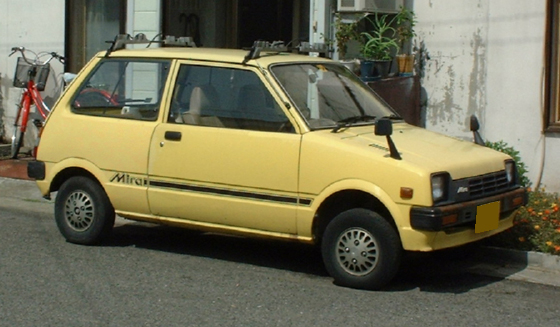
- Daihatsu Mira Cuore 3-door (L55)

Overview
- Also called: Daihatsu Cuore; Daihatsu Domino; Daihatsu Handi
- Production: June 1980 – August 1985
- Assembly: Japan: Ikeda, Osaka

Body and chassis
- Body style: 3-door hatchback/van 5-door hatchback

Powertrain
- Engine: 547 cc AB10/30/31 I2; 547 cc AB35 turbo I2; 617 cc AD I2
- Transmission: 4/5-speed manual 2-speed Daimatic; 2-speed automatic

Dimensions
- Wheelbase: 2,150 mm (84.6 in)
- Length: 3,195 mm (125.8 in)
- Width: 1,395 mm (54.9 in)
- Height: 1,370 mm (53.9 in)
- Curb weight: 560–575 kg (1,235–1,268 lb)

In June 1980, the Daihatsu Mira and Cuore arrived to replace the Daihatsu Max Cuore. A certain amount of confusion arises from the fact that this, the L55-series, was the first-generation Daihatsu Mira, but is usually considered the second generation of the Cuore – and that the Mira was originally marketed as the Mira Cuore.

The range was facelifted lightly in May 1982, when the Mira dropped the "Cuore" portion of its name. Also new was the sporty five-speed MGX (three-door only), fitted with radial tires. The autoclutch "Daimatic" transmission was replaced by a fully automatic two-speed unit at the same time. In October 1983, turbocharged and four-wheel drive versions of the Mira van were made available.

The L55 series was sold with two main engines - the two-cylinder AB10 unit of 547 cc, and the slightly larger 617-cc AD unit, which was installed in the export-only L60 Cuore. They both featured twin balancing shafts, producing a smoothness and silent operations on par with a traditional four-cylinder engine. In tests, the 617-cc version of the car received plaudits for its refinement and its "lively" character and "enthusiastic" performance when compared to European competitors such as the Fiat Panda 30 and the Citroën Visa Club, both also with two-cylinder engines. The main issue was cost; the balance shaft-equipped two-cylinder supposedly cost as much to build as a conventional four-cylinder engine. The car was also commended by Quattroruote for its agile city driving characteristics, although it could hardly be considered fully fit for the autostrada. The 30 PS (22 kW) "big" version has a top speed of 120 km/h (75 mph).

The bigger engine was introduced in the second half of 1982, as part of a push by Daihatsu to push its European exports. In some markets, the two engines were both available. In Belgium, for instance, they were sold as the Cuore 550 for the small version and as the Cuore 623/625, depending on which bodywork was fitted. The Cuore sold well in both Argentina and Chile in 1980 (4,300 cars shipped), but economic hardship there led to a cancellation of exports by 1982.

In October 1983, the Mira Turbo appeared. It had a carburetted and turbocharged version of the little two-cylinder engine. This was enough for 41 PS (30 kW) and a resulting top speed of 130 km/h (81 mph). In February 1985, the first Mira Parco special edition arrived, heralding a long relationship between Daihatsu and the Parco clothing chain. It received 10-inch alloy wheels, front disc brakes, air conditioning, radial tires, and a special Parco interior, and was sold directly through 11 Parco stores nationwide. Parco also advertised the car through their own publications.

Giovanni Michelotti used this generation Cuore as the basis for the "Michelotti PAC" prototype (Personal Automotive Commuter) shown at Geneva in 1985.

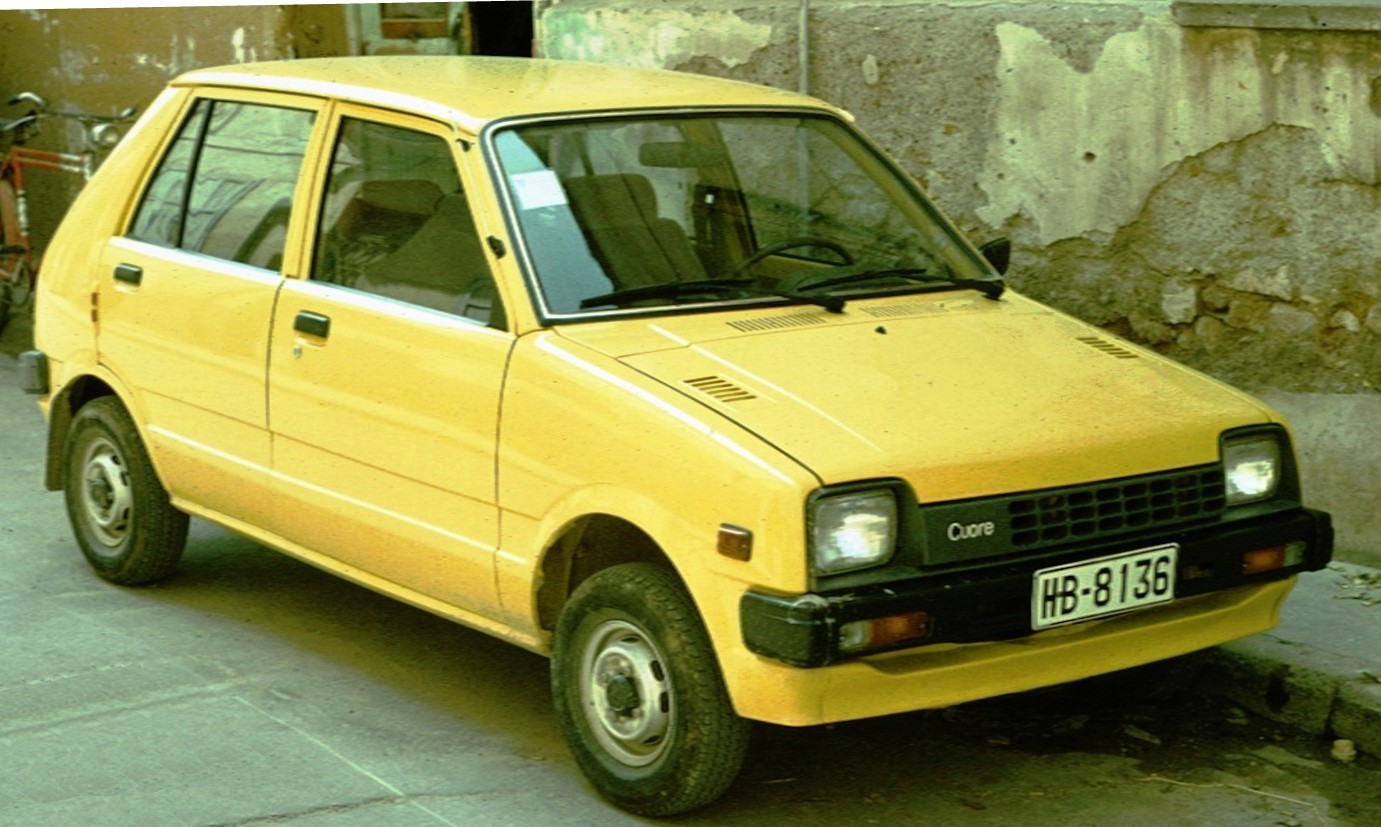
Five-door, L55 Daihatsu Cuore (in Greece)

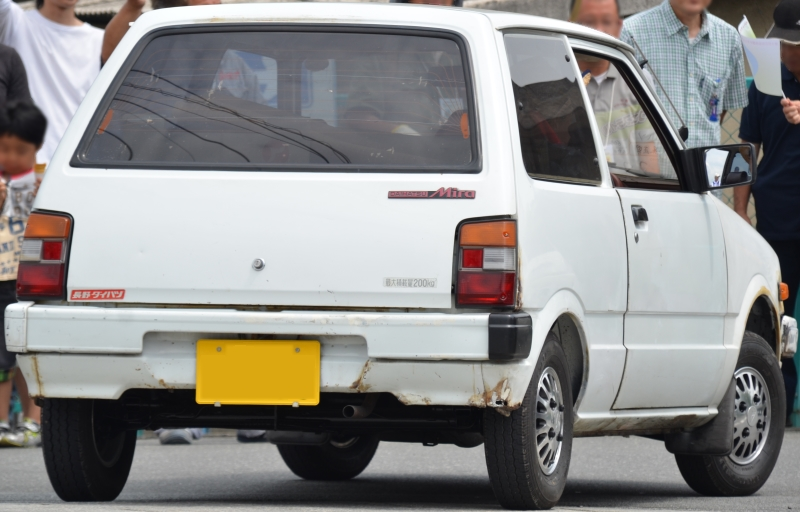
Three-door, L55 Daihatsu Mira rear

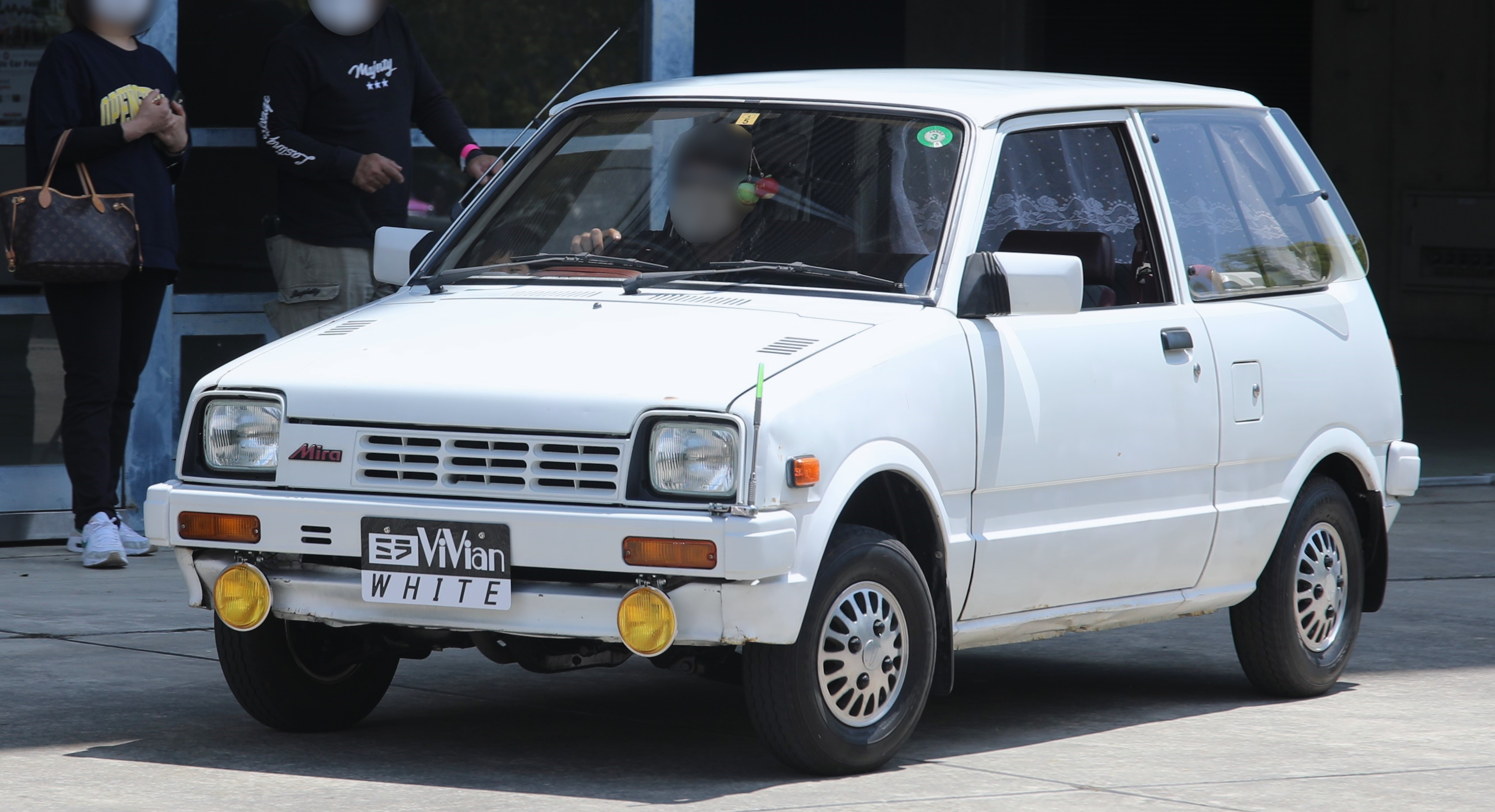
Facelift

== L70/L80 series (1985) ==
Daihatsu Mira L70
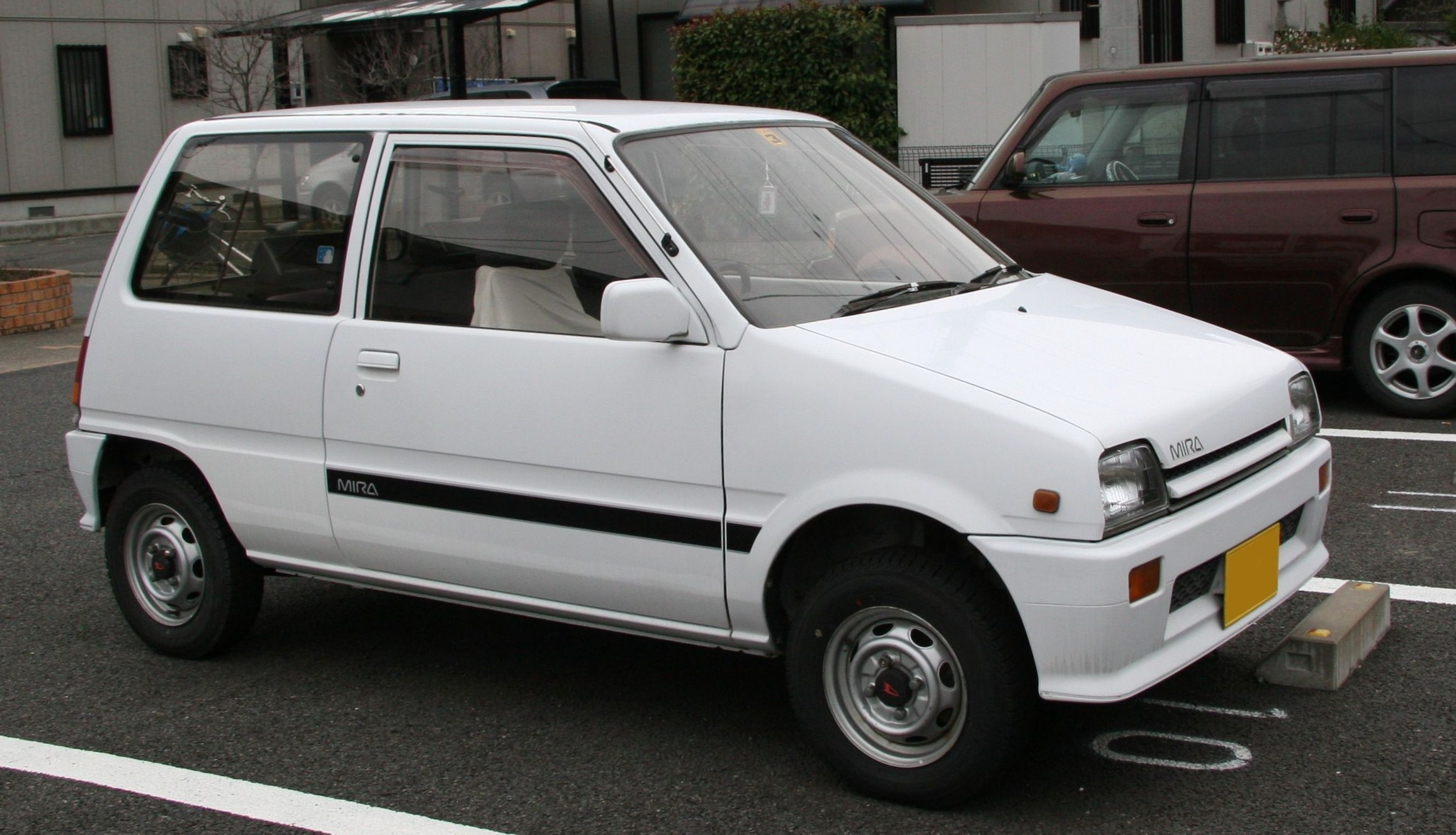
- Very late (1990) second generation Mira Parco

Overview
- Also called: Daihatsu Cuore; Daihatsu Domino; Daihatsu Miracab; Daihatsu Handi; Daihatsu Handivan
- Production: August 1985 – March 1990
- Assembly: Japan: Ikeda, Osaka; Thailand: Bangkok (Bangchan General Assembly)

Body and chassis
- Body style: 3/5-door hatchback/van 2-door pick up (Thailand)
- Related: Daihatsu Leeza

Powertrain
- Engine: 547 cc EB I3; 796 cc ED-10A I3; 847 cc ED-10 I3
- Transmission: 4/5-speed manual 2-speed automatic

Dimensions
- Wheelbase: 2,250–2,320 mm (88.6–91.3 in)
- Length: 3,195–3,350 mm (125.8–131.9 in)
- Width: 1,395 mm (54.9 in)
- Height: 1,400–1,465 mm (55.1–57.7 in)
- Curb weight: 610 kg (1,345 lb); 620 kg (1,367 lb) (4WD)

The second-generation (L70) Mira/Cuore was released in August 1985. It had a longer wheelbase and a new generation of three-cylinder engines replacing the previous two-cylinder (AB) versions. Displacement of the new EB engines remained exactly the same, at 547 cc. For the L80 export versions, an 847-cc three-cylinder was developed, called ED-10. In September 1986, a special version for the Swiss market appeared, with a narrower bore version displacing 796 cc (called ED-10A). Unlike the fractionally larger standard version, this one suited the four tax horsepower category in certain cantons, while other cantons had prominent tax limits at 800 cc.

For the domestic Japanese market versions, commercial versions (Mira) were sold alongside passenger-car versions (Cuore). The commercials had temporary rear seats that fold completely flat, and are easily recognized by luggage rails in the rear side windows. For the previous generation, a version with switchable four-wheel drive was available for the "Van" version (chassis code L71V). The engines were originally carburetted, and either naturally aspirated or turbocharged (with intercooler). These offered 38 and 52 PS (28 and 38 kW), respectively. The turbo version was originally only available as a Mira (three-door commercial), and was introduced two months after the regular version. Transmissions were either four- or five-speed manuals, with a two-speed automatic also available for the non-turbo versions.

In January 1986, a five-door "Van" (Mira) version was added. A "Walk-through Van" version, using the regular bonnet combined with near square rear bodywork, appeared two months later. Folding doors (optional at the rear) made access possible even in the tightest streets. In August 1987, the Mira/Cuore received a minor facelift with a new grille and bonnet, as well as some other detail changes, all making for a smoother appearance overall. Two months later, a all-wheel drive version was made available in the turbocharged version. In February 1988, another Mira Parco special edition arrived. It was only available in black and with a bright, pop-colored interior, and was aimed at 20-something buyers. This model sold out rapidly, and for the summer, a second Parco edition (now with a bright-blue interior) arrived, followed by the third Mira Parco in February 1989. This version received a turbocharged engine and four-wheel drive.

After having undergone another minor change in October 1988, a 50-PS turbocharged Cuore TR/CR series for passenger use was also made available, in a five-door version as well. A limited edition of 500 examples of the Mira Sedan TR-XX Limited was also sold. In the Japanese kei car market, "sedan" refers to the car's intended usage as a passenger car rather than as a commercial vehicle; these have a proper rear seat and generally more comfortable equipment. This was introduced in April 1989, which also marked the end of the division of the line into Mira and Cuore – as the Cuore nameplate was retired in Japan with the abolition of commodity tax; from now on the commercial and passenger models were simply called Mira Van and Mira Sedan. Japanese production of the L70 series ended when the new 660-cc L200 version was introduced in March 1990 in response to new regulations for the kei class.

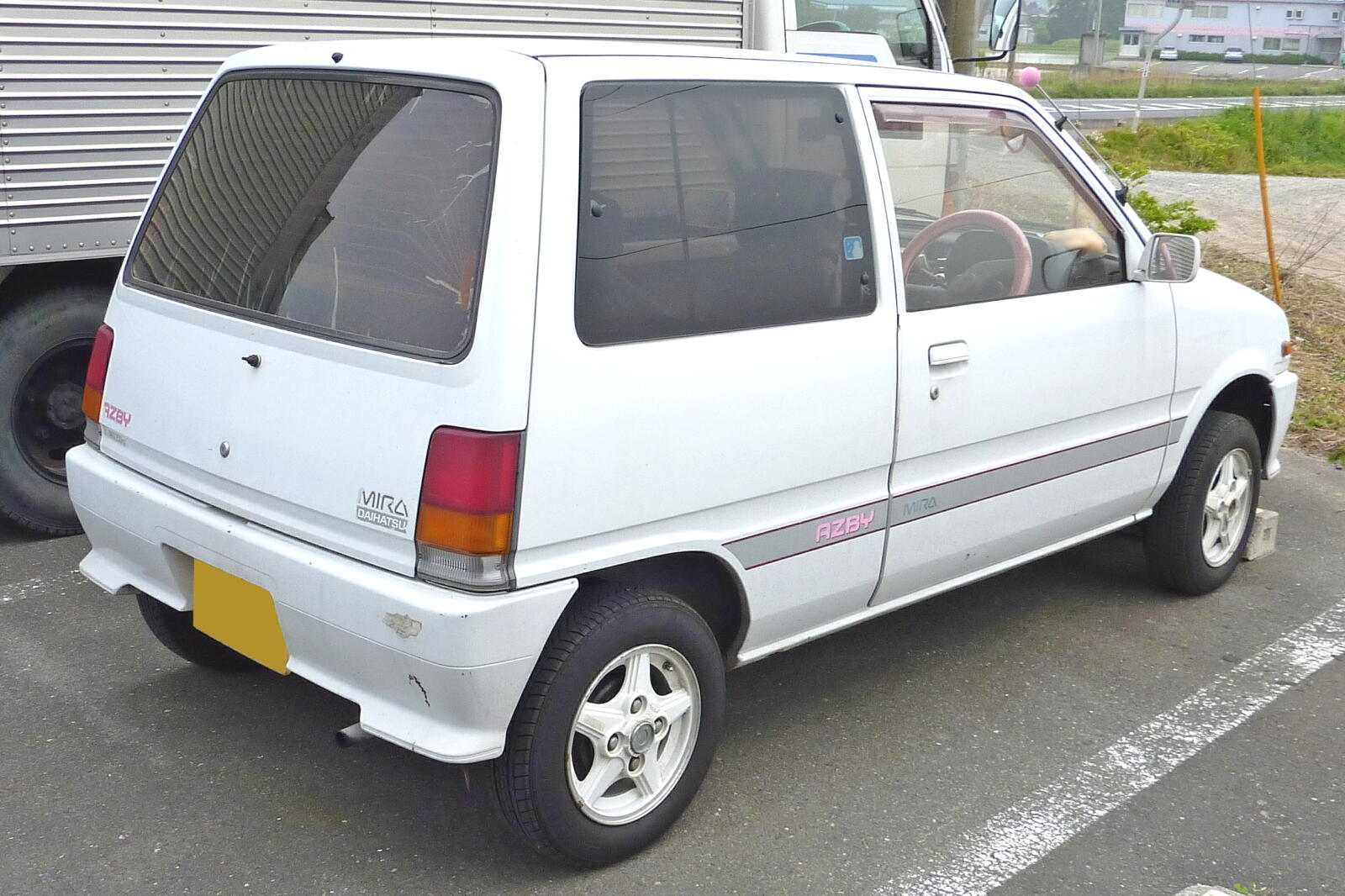
Daihatsu Mira rear

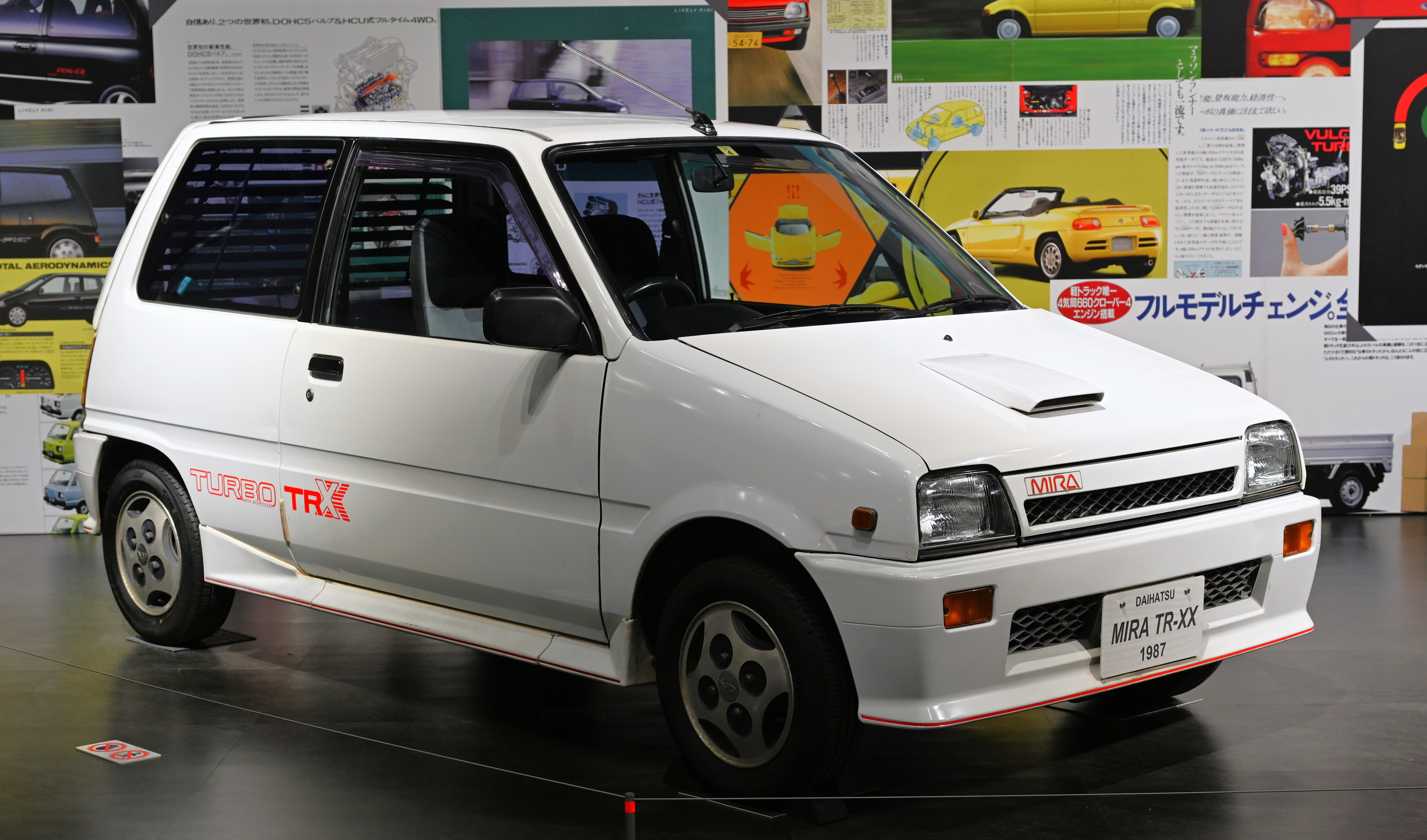
1987 Daihatsu Mira TR-XX

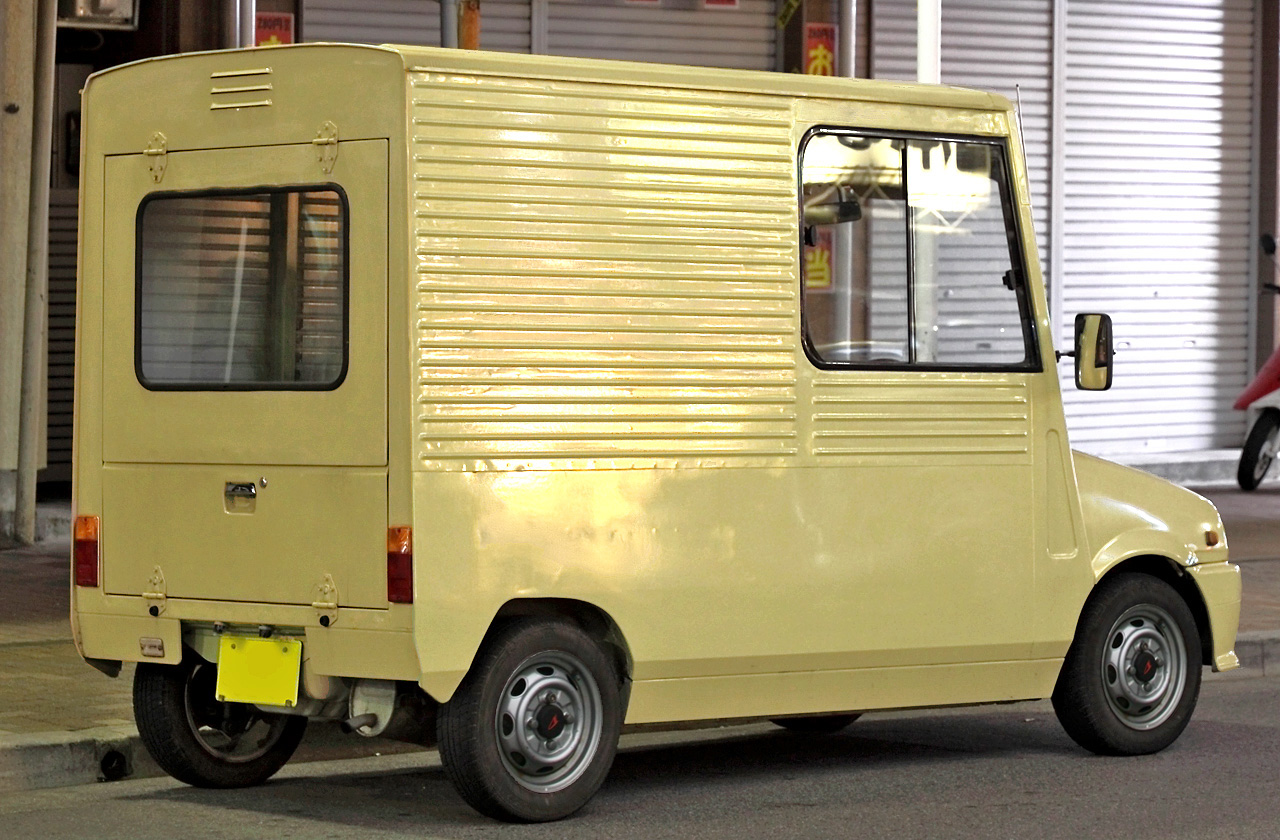
Daihatsu Mira Walk-through Van (rear view)

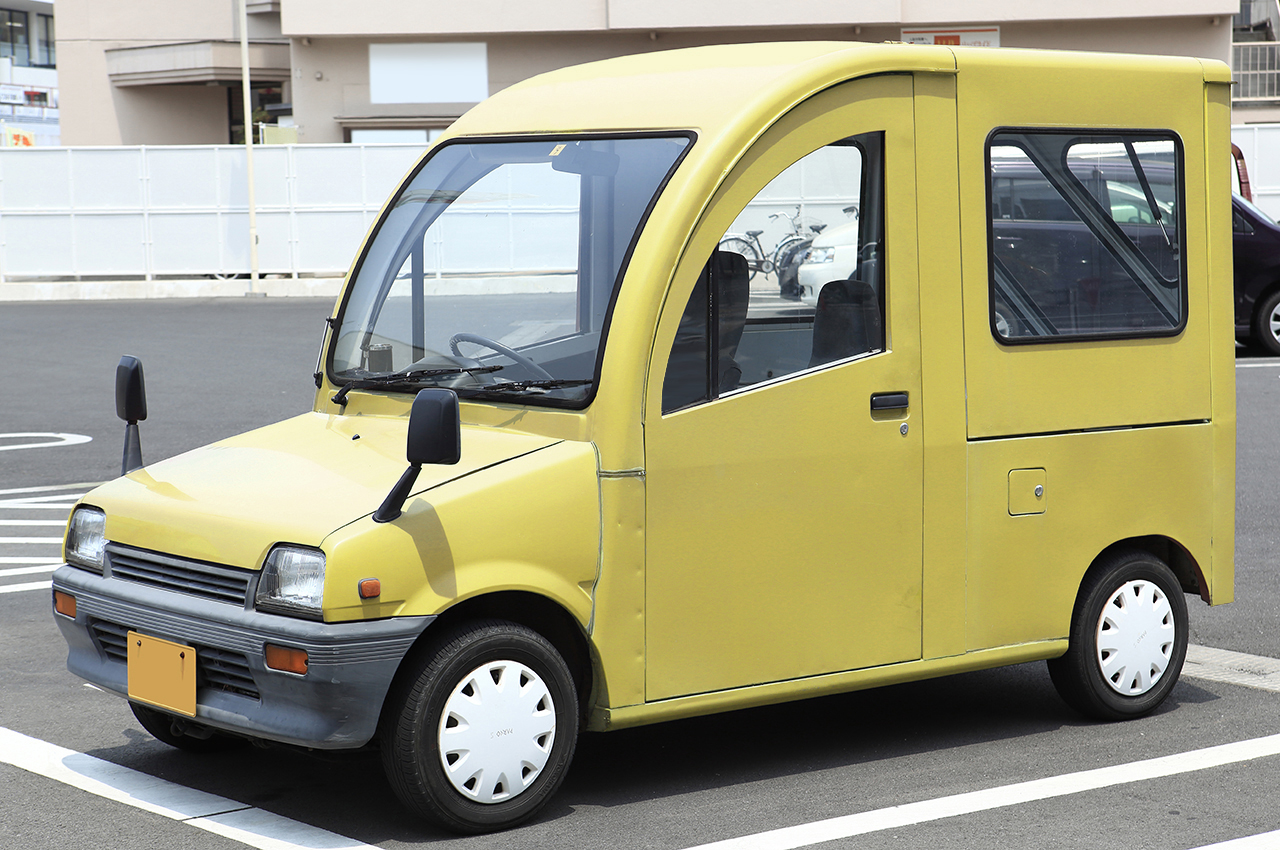
Daihatsu Mira Michito

=== Thailand ===
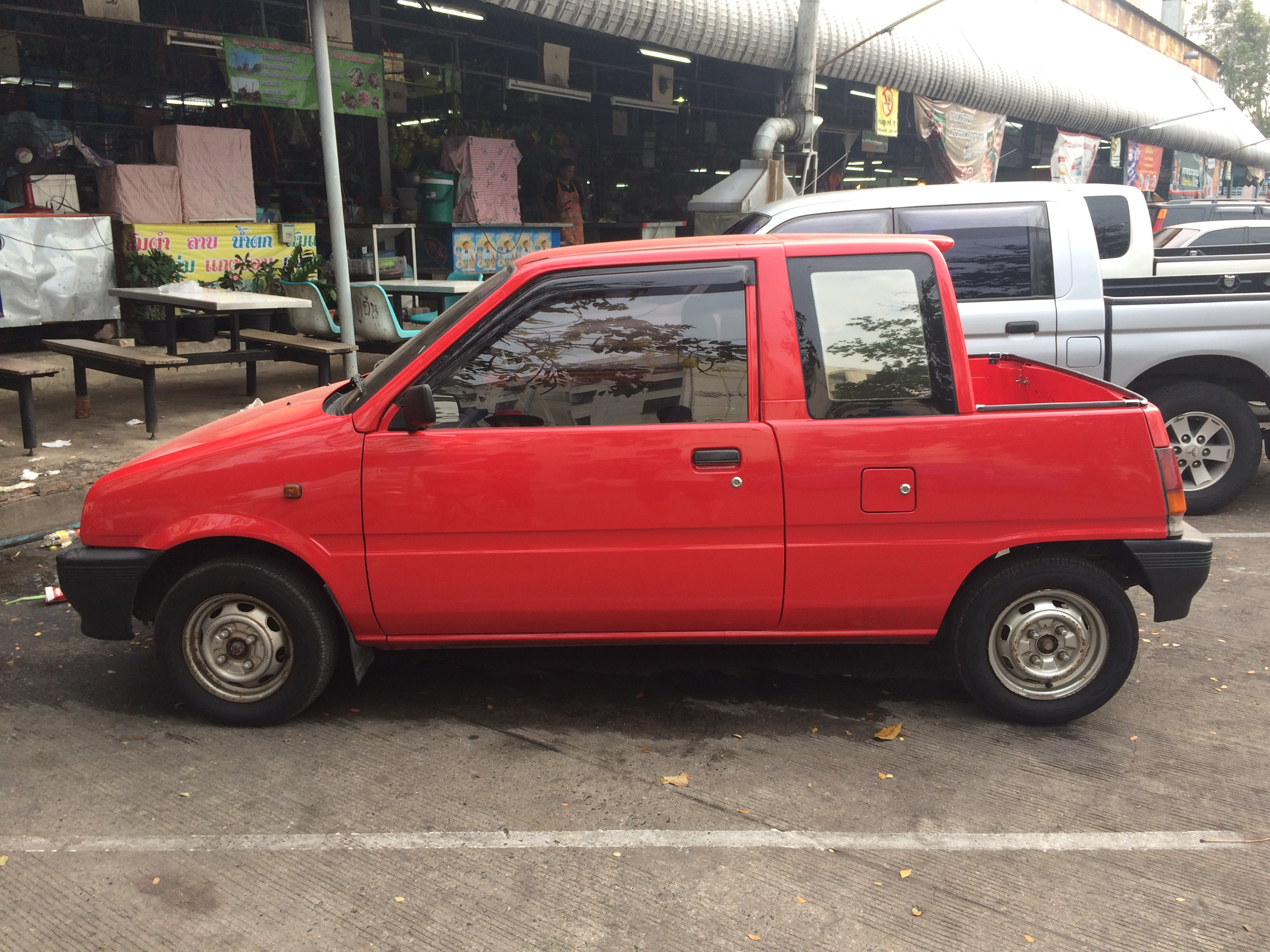
Thai-built Daihatsu Miracab

Daihatsu's Thai arm carried on producing the L70 series after it was replaced in Japan, beginning in the second half of 1990. These were built by Daihatsu Phra Nakhon Motor, a joint venture between Daihatsu, Phra Nakhon Automobile, and the C. Itoh trading company. In addition to assembling the regular version, they also developed a ute version for the pickup-hungry Thai domestic market called the Mira P1, which was built from 1990 to 1995. This featured a pickup bed, tailgate, and redesigned taillights. The Mira pickup was extremely popular, with Daihatsu's Thai sales jumping by 50% as a result. Coming full circle, and mirroring the development of the SUV, Daihatsu Phra Nakhon also developed the Mira P4 - a roofed four-seater wagon version of this micro-ute. Some P4s retained the pickup's fold-down tailgate, adding a top-hinged glass, while some had a top-hinged one-piece tailgate. Later, an extended-cab 2+2-seater ute ("Daihatsu Miracab") and a hatchback with an enlarged rear end, called the "Mint", were offered.

While originally using the smaller engines as per the original Japanese specifications, these were too long to be classified as true kei cars. Later cars have the 850-cc engine as used in many other export markets. Nonetheless, the 1997 Asian financial crisis marked the end for Daihatsu in Thailand, as sales plummeted from 4,000 in 1995 to 160 in 1997. Production ended in February 1998, and by March 1998, Daihatsu no longer offered cars in the Thai market.

=== Philippines ===
In 2004, Norkis, a Philippine company (known as the former assembler and distributor of Yamaha motorcycles in the country), revived the Mira Pickup, locally reconditioned from used imports and sold as the Legacy. A panel van version is also available, as is a four-door double cab with a very short bed. Unlike the original L70 Mira, they have the later 659-cc EF engine, which is also available to run on LPG. It is longer and heavier than the original, with the original two-seat pickup weighing in at 900 kg (1,984 lb) and 3,630 mm (143 in) long.

== L200 series (1990) ==
Daihatsu Mira L200
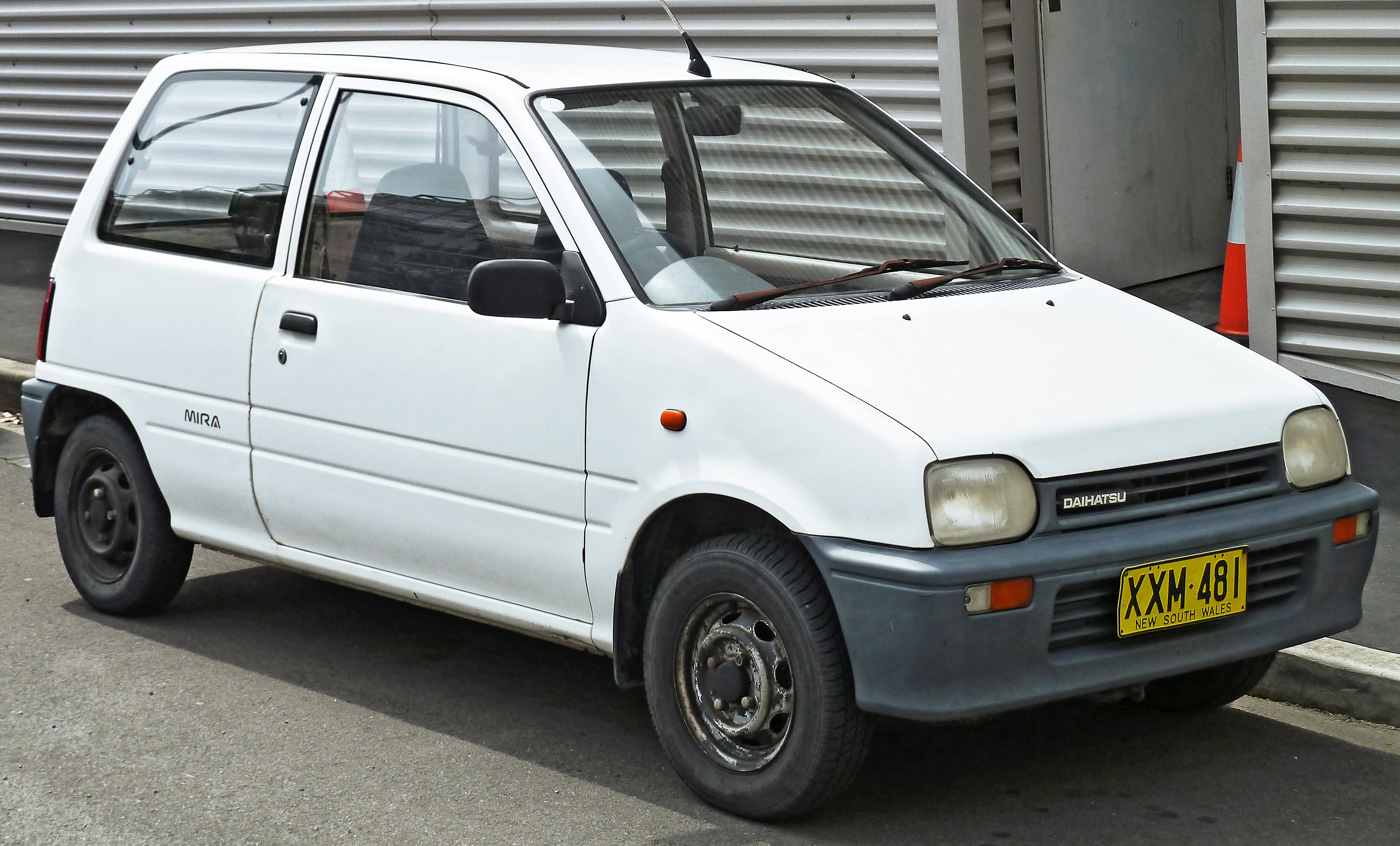
- Daihatsu Mira three-door, Australia

Overview
- Also called: Daihatsu Cuore; Daihatsu Domino; Daihatsu Handivan; Daihatsu Ceria (Indonesia); Perodua Kancil (Malaysia)
- Production: March 1990–September 1994; August 1994–July 2009 (Perodua Kancil)
- Assembly: Japan: Ikeda, Osaka; Malaysia: Rawang, Selangor (PMSB, Perodua Kancil); Indonesia: North Jakarta (ADM, Ceria)

Body and chassis
- Body style: 3/5-door hatchback/van 2-door walk-through van
- Related: Daihatsu Opti (L300)

Powertrain
- Engine: 547 cc EB I3; 659 cc EF I3; 847 cc ED10 I3
- Transmission: 4/5-speed manual 2/3/4-speed automatic

Dimensions
- Wheelbase: 2,280 mm (89.8 in)
- Length: 3,295 mm (129.7 in)
- Width: 1,395 mm (54.9 in)
- Height: 1,415 mm (55.7 in)
- Curb weight: 640 kg (1,411 lb); 670–690 kg (1,477–1,521 lb) (4WD)

The L200/201 was the third and thus far most popular generation of the vehicle, offered in a large number of variants. The Cuore name was dropped in the Japanese domestic market, as the differences between passenger and commercial versions were narrowed. The L200 (front-wheel drive) was produced with the Mira badge from the spring of 1990 until at least 1998, but the platform has lived on under other names. L201 was the chassis code used on export market cars, usually labelled Cuore.

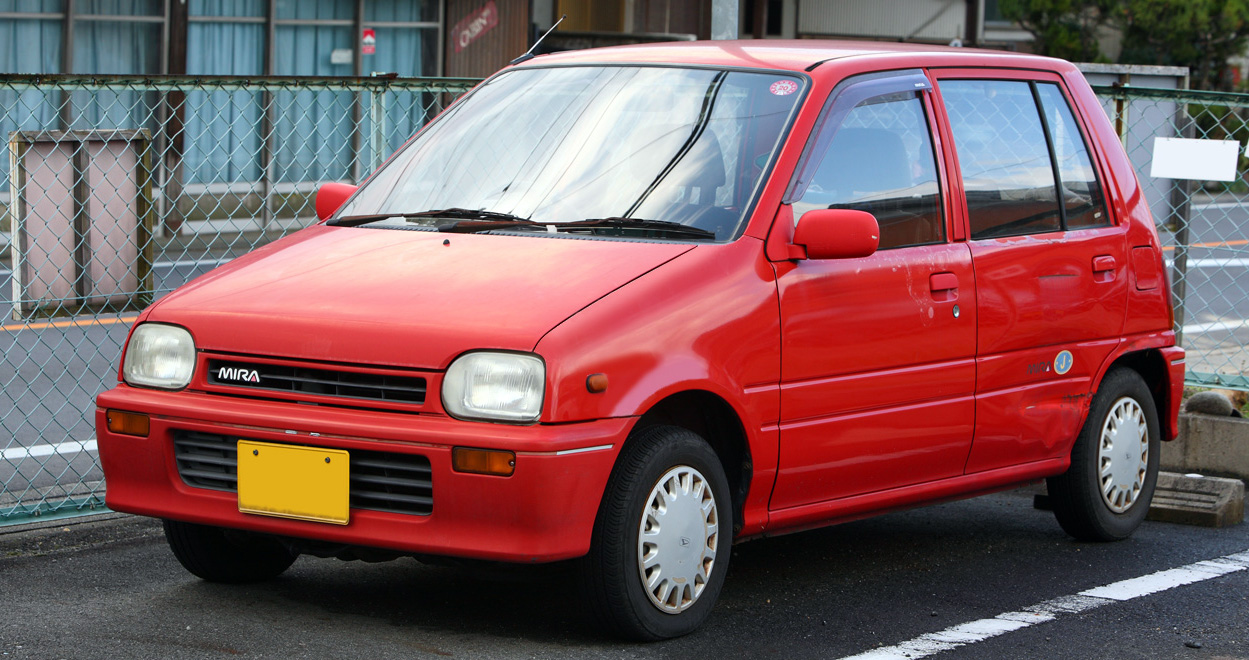
Daihatsu Mira J-type five-door (pre-facelift)

As with most kei cars, the 200-series was built in two primary variants: The "V" Series is a windowed van style intended for light commercial use. This variant featured a fold-down rear bench seat without seat belts. The "S" series, intended for private use, is largely similar, but the larger, more comfortable rear seats are equipped with belts and are further to the rear of the vehicle with more leg room. While the seats still fold down, unlike the "V", the "S" does not offer a flat loading floor. These characteristics are due to Japanese tax preferences for commercial vehicles, which only allow for temporary accommodation in the rear and demand a flat loading floor. The top-of-the-line, turbocharged TR-XX model was available both as a passenger car version and as a van, with slightly higher equipment levels for the passenger version, which was fitted with a fuel-injected, 12-valve, turbocharged, and intercooled engine (EF-JL) producing 64 PS (47 kW). The TR-XX van, meanwhile, had less stringent emissions requirements and received a carburetted, six-valve version of the same intercooled turbo engine (EF-XL), producing 61 PS (45 kW) without the passenger version's three-way catalyst.

The range received a very subtle facelift of a more rounded overall appearance for 1993; it included altered front and rear lights, bumpers, and a new bonnet and front seats. This version was available to Japanese customers from August 1992, and also incorporated some changes to the lineup. Turbocharged automatics now received a four-speed transmission. Shortly thereafter, the new RV-4 model appeared. This version, with its crossover pretensions, latched onto the wave of so-called "RVs" (recreational vehicles) that became popular in Japan in the early 1990s. The RV-4 received distinct cladding, somewhat raised suspension, a roof rack and bullbar, as well as a protective plate for the engine.

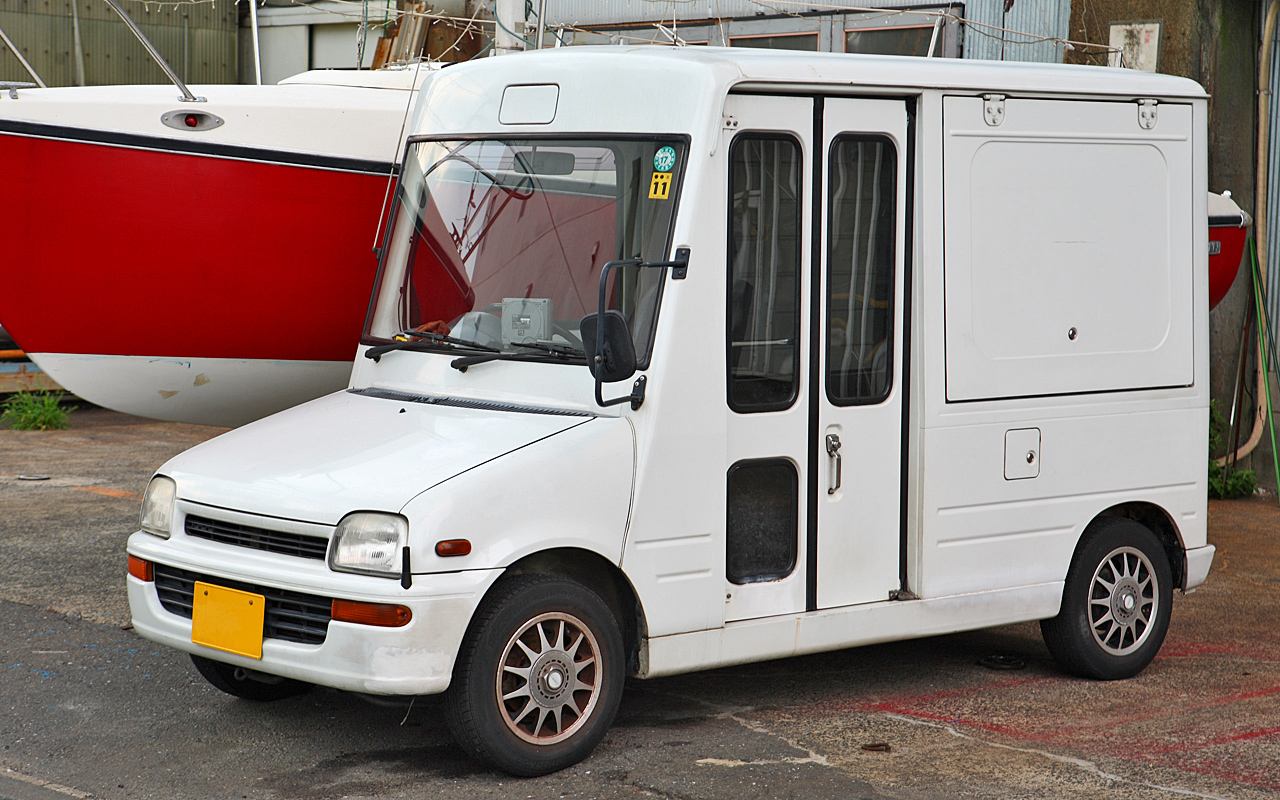
Daihatsu Mira Walk-through Van, facelift model

The Mira could either be equipped with a three-speed automatic, or four- or five-speed manual transmission. A part-time four-wheel drive variant known as the L210 was also available in V or S models, only with the five-speed manual. Also, a version with mechanical four-wheel steering (the L220), so far was the only kei car to feature this option. In November 1990, a version with all-wheel drive (permanent four-wheel drive) appeared, called the X-4. This had the same 64 PS (47 kW) fuel-injected, turbocharged engine as the front-wheel drive-only TR-XX, and shared much of that car's equipment. Sales targets were about 700 cars per month for this version. Along with the August 1992 facelift, the X-4 was incorporated into the TR-XX series, while the TR-XX van was discontinued, reflecting changing tax conditions.

The TR-XX's electronically fuel-injected, SOHC, 12-valve (four per cylinder) turbo was the range topper, whereas the normally aspirated base versions made do with a single-barrel carburetor. To break the stranglehold of the Suzuki Alto Works on the All-Japan Rally Championship, the Mira X4R was developed in 1991. It had a strengthened engine with a forged crankshaft and flywheel and other detail improvements, a close-ratio gearbox, and various chassis improvements. Equipment was stripped, with a minimal interior and diagonal tires since all such parts would be replaced by competitors. The Group A X4R was sold at a rate of about 10 units per month at a price about twenty percent higher than the regular X-4. Noriyuki Hotta won the class championship in 1992.

A taller, highly customizable, two-seat step-van variant (Walk-through Van) with folding side doors on the passenger side and a regular driver's side door was also produced, solely for the Japanese market. This reached the maximum height allowed for kei cars, 2.0 m (6 ft 7 in).

Export

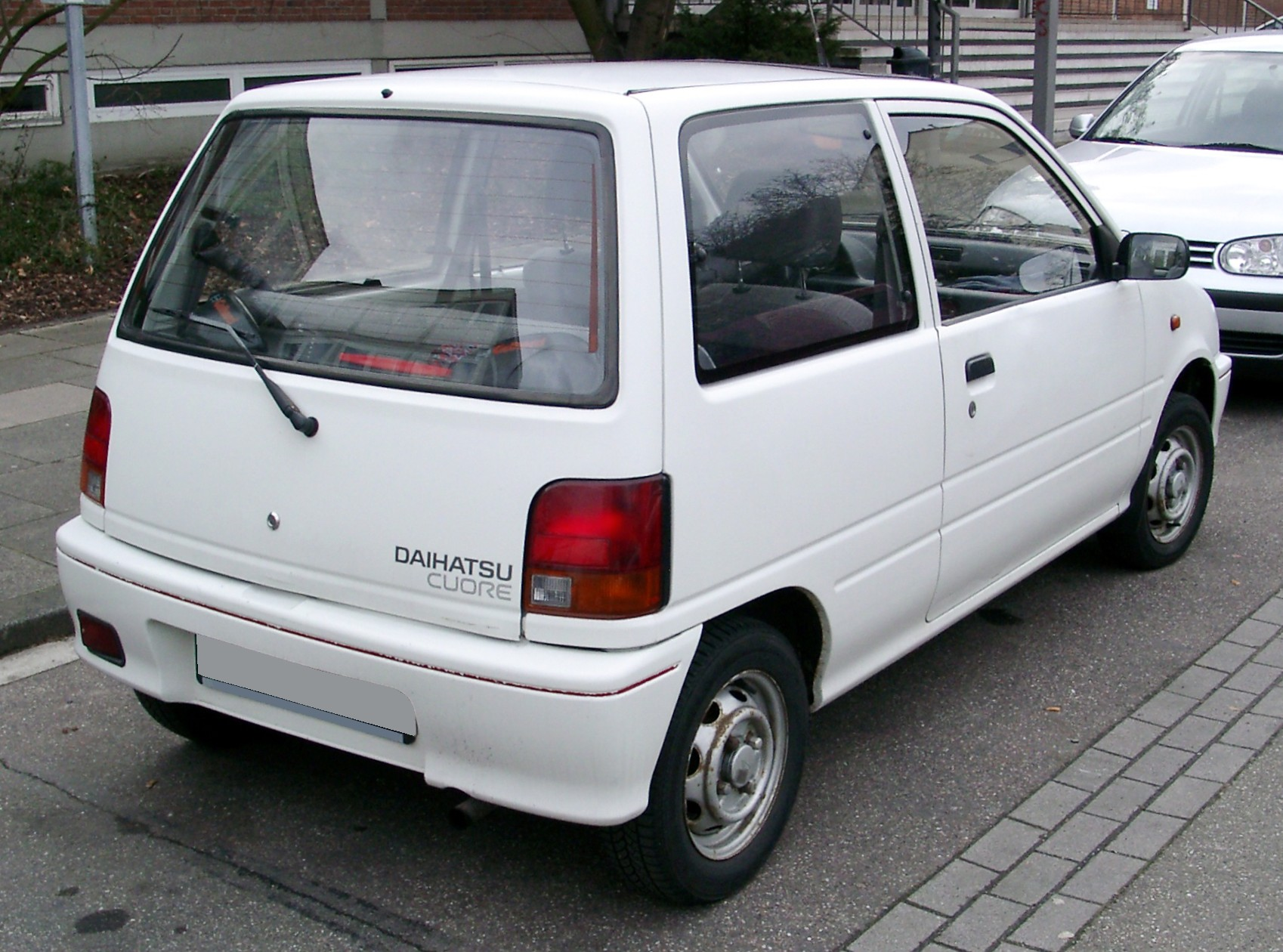
Daihatsu Cuore three-door, Europe

The L201 was sold outside Japan, primarily in Europe, Australia and New Zealand. The three- or five-door L201 retained the larger-displacement engine of 847 cc (ED10K) and a choice of four- or five-speed manual transmissions, or a three-speed automatic option. This carburetted engine produced 41 PS (30 kW) (ECE) at 5500 rpm. Van versions were also available in Australia, called Handivan (later shortened to Handi). The van, sometimes with filled-in rear windows, was also marketed in certain other markets, such as the Netherlands, where the tax structure favoured it.

The L200/L201 had a myriad of market and model differences. Most European-bound models were badged as Cuore, but the name Domino was retained in Belgium and Luxembourg. And despite the Mira badge mostly being used in right-hand drive markets, left-hand drive Mira-badged L201s were sold in the Dominican Republic.

Left-hand drive European-spec L201s received a fog lamp on the left side. When sold in the United Kingdom (where Japan-specification Miras were also available), they had a rear fog lamp mounted on the right side. L200 Miras produced for Japan had no rear fog lamps. Later models of the Mira had fog lamps on both sides. The L201 also had two license-plate lamps, while the L200 had only one.

This generation of the Mira was chosen by Malaysia's Perodua to be rebadged as its first product. The L200 went on sale in Malaysia as the Perodua Kancil in 1994. After several facelifts (around 1997, 2000 and 2002), production of the Kancil finally came to an end in July 2009. The Malaysian-built Kancil was marketed as the Daihatsu Ceria in Indonesia between 2001 and 2006.

== L500 series (1994) ==
Daihatsu Mira L500
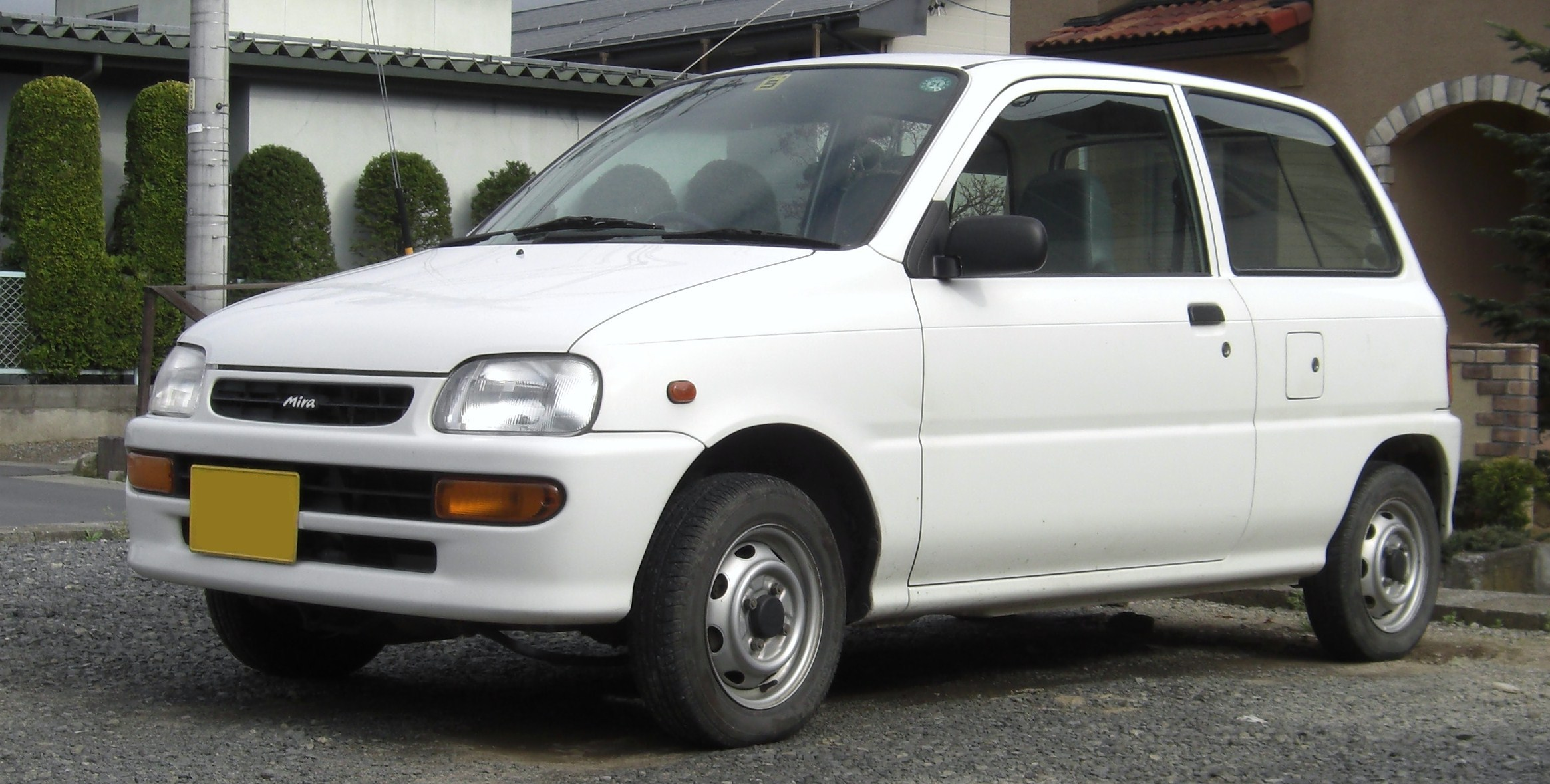
- Daihatsu Mira (Japan; pre-facelift)

Overview
- Also called: Daihatsu Cuore; Daihatsu Handivan; Daihatsu Charade Centro (Australia)
- Production: September 1994 – October 1998; 2000–2012 (Pakistan)
- Assembly: Japan: Ikeda, Osaka; Pakistan: Karachi (Toyota Indus)

Body and chassis
- Body style: 3/5-door hatchback/van
- Related: Daihatsu Move (L600); Daihatsu Opti (L800)

Powertrain
- Engine: 659 cc EF-CL/FL/KL I3; 659 cc EF-EL 12-valve I3; 659 cc EF-JL 12-valve turbo I3; 659 cc JB-EL I4; 659 cc JB-JL turbo I4; 847 cc ED-10/20 I3; 847 cc ED-DE 12-valve DOHC I3
- Transmission: 4/5-speed manual 3/4-speed automatic

Dimensions
- Wheelbase: 2,300 mm (90.6 in)
- Length: 3,295 mm (129.7 in)
- Width: 1,395 mm (54.9 in)
- Height: 1,465 mm (57.7 in)
- Curb weight: 710 kg (1,565 lb)

Production of the L500 Miras started in September 1994. The design of the car was slightly altered throughout, but retained a look similar to that of the L200. The L500 Mira was badged outside Japan primarily as the L501 Cuore. The 200 series Mira ceased sales in Japan, but continued in some other markets, where it received the same engine updates as did the export L500.

In the Japanese market, the Mira Moderno, a separate range of cars (noncommercials), was added in October 1995. This range received a minor facelift in May 1996, which was extended to the rest of the range in May 1997. In August 1997, the Mira Classic was added, a retro-look version. The Classic was available with naturally aspirated engines (40 PS or 29 kW as a front-wheel drive, 55 PS or 40 kW with 4WD) or a turbocharged option with 64 PS (47 kW). The Classic was succeeded by the equally retro-designed Mira Gino, which was based on the fifth generation (L700). In January 1998, in cooperation with Sanrio, a "Hello Kitty" version of the Mira Moderno appeared. This was available in pastel colors and received various Hello Kitty details throughout the car, such as a Hello Kitty ignition key.

The L500 was Daihatsu's first kei-class vehicle to feature a four-cylinder engine, with the option of the new JB-series engine. When equipped with this engine, the model code became L502. The range of models available in the 200 platform more or less carried over to the 500 series. One change was that the export versions received fuel injection as standard, which brought the output of the 847 cc engine up by one, to 42 PS (31 kW). This engine was called the ED-20. The four-speed manual was no longer available, but a four-speed automatic joined the existing three-speed version in the domestic Japanese market. In November 1996 a twin-cam, 12-valve version of the 847 cc three-cylinder was also made available. This, the ED-DE, produced 50 PS (37 kW) at 5,500 rpm.

In Australia, the L500 Mira was sold as the Daihatsu Charade Centro. The model remained in production in Pakistan, as the Daihatsu Cuore. The L500 was produced by Toyota Indus Motor Company between March 2000 and 2012, with the 847-cc, carburetted engine (ED-10), which has been used in export models since 1986. The Pakistani Cuores have 41 PS (30 kW) and were only built with the five-door hatchback bodywork. In all, 2440 cars were built in 2001, although annual capacity was about four times higher.

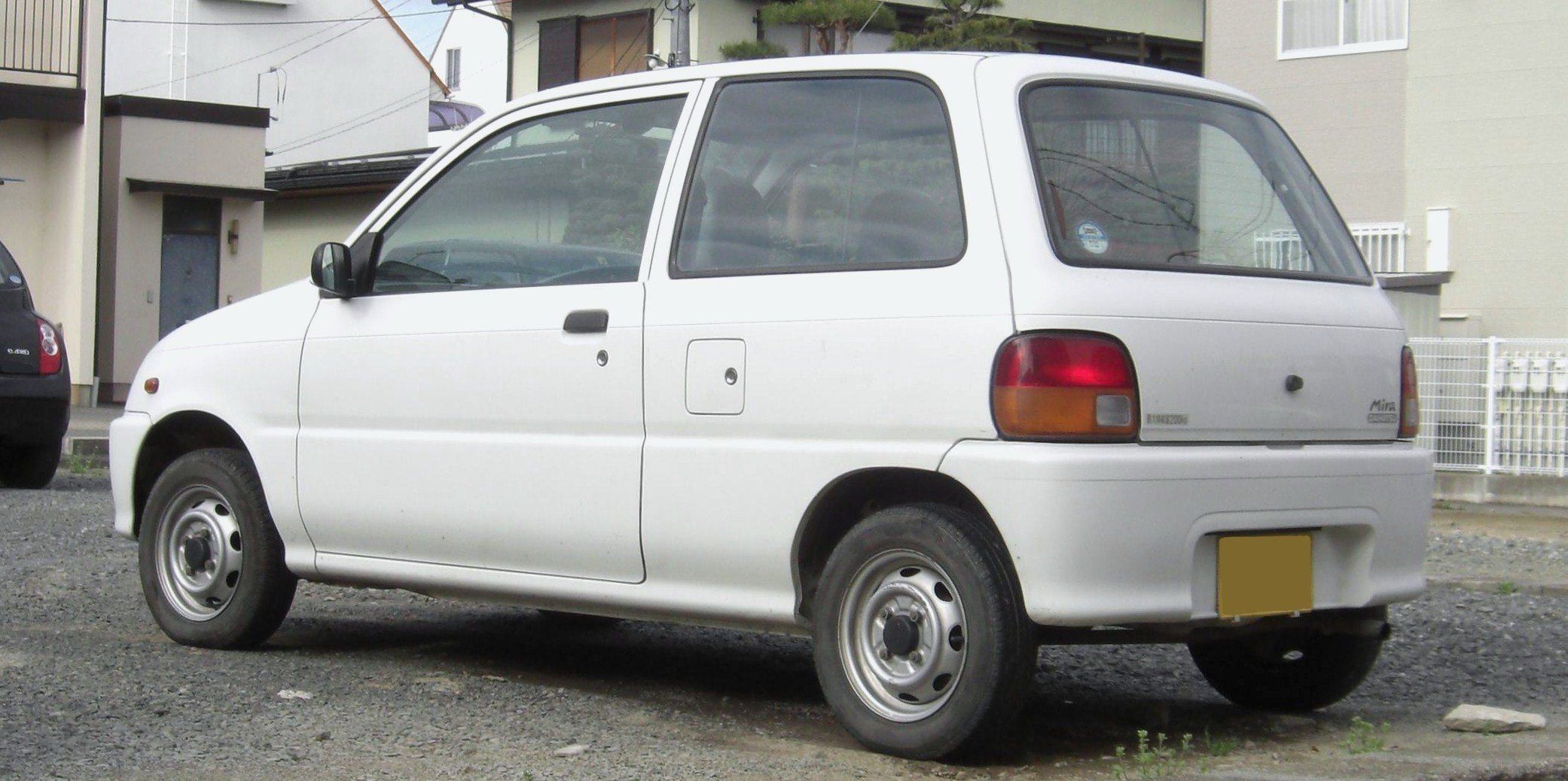
Rear view

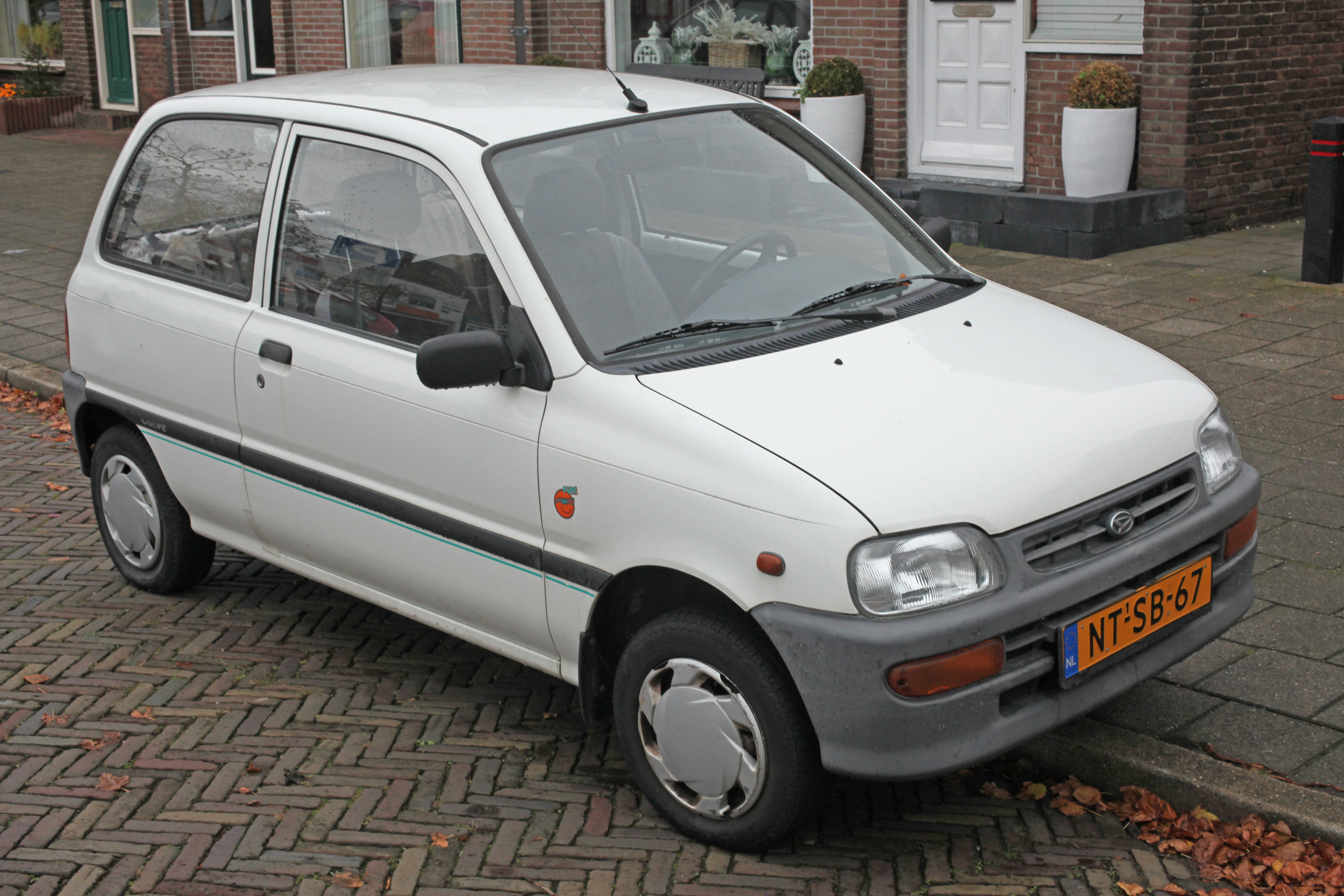
1996 Daihatsu Cuore

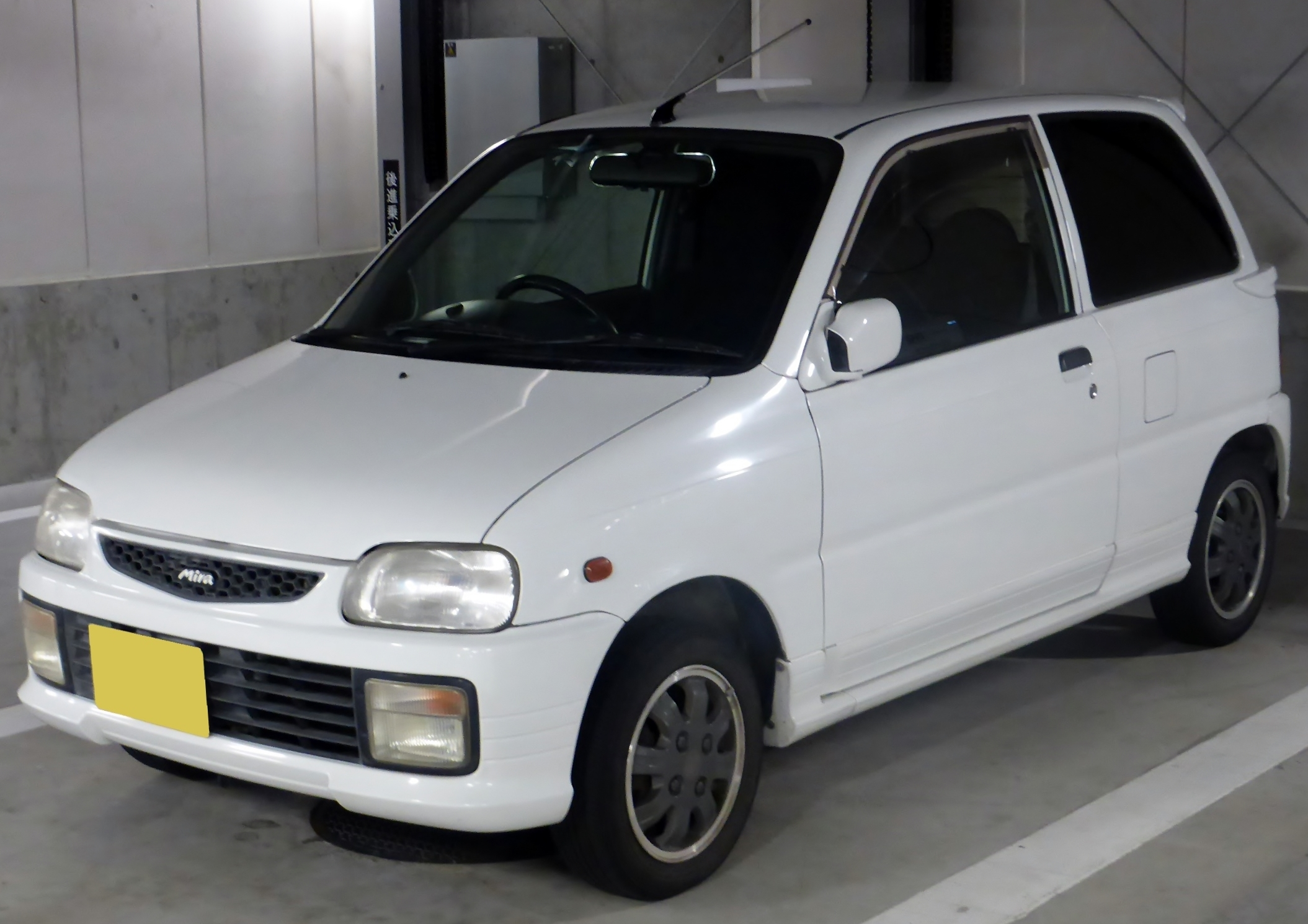
Pre-facelift Mira CL Turbo (1995–96)

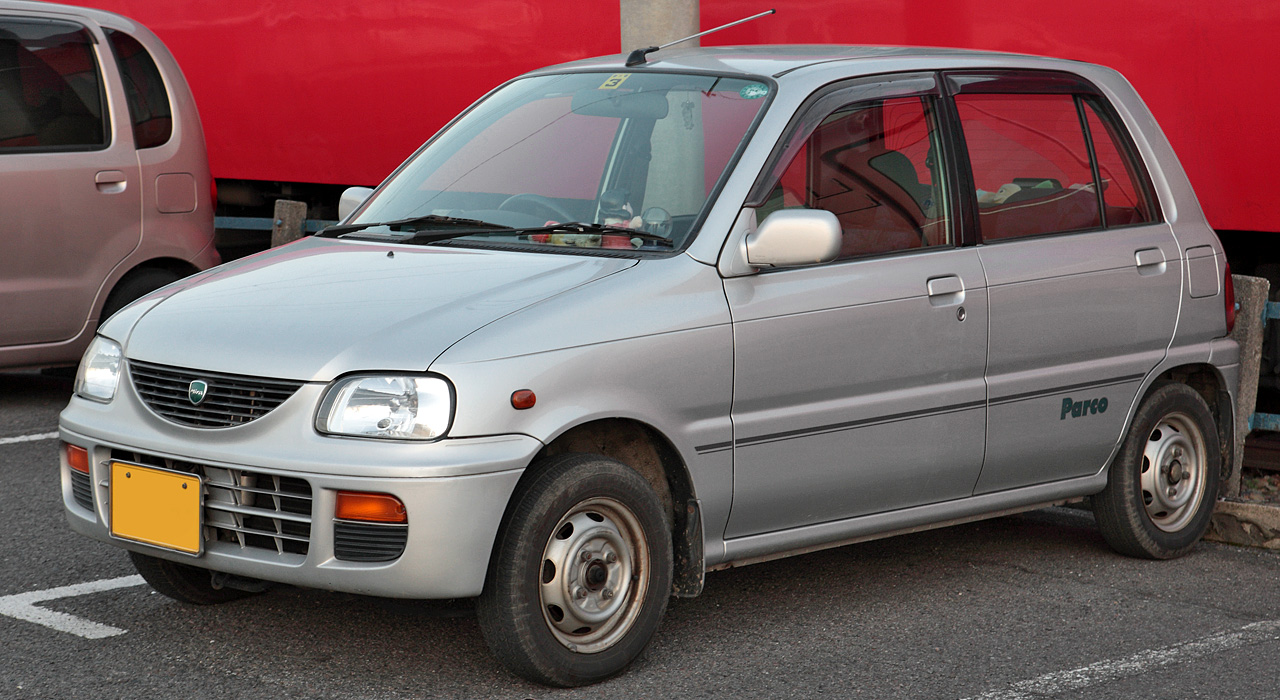
Facelifted Mira Moderno Parco (1996–98)

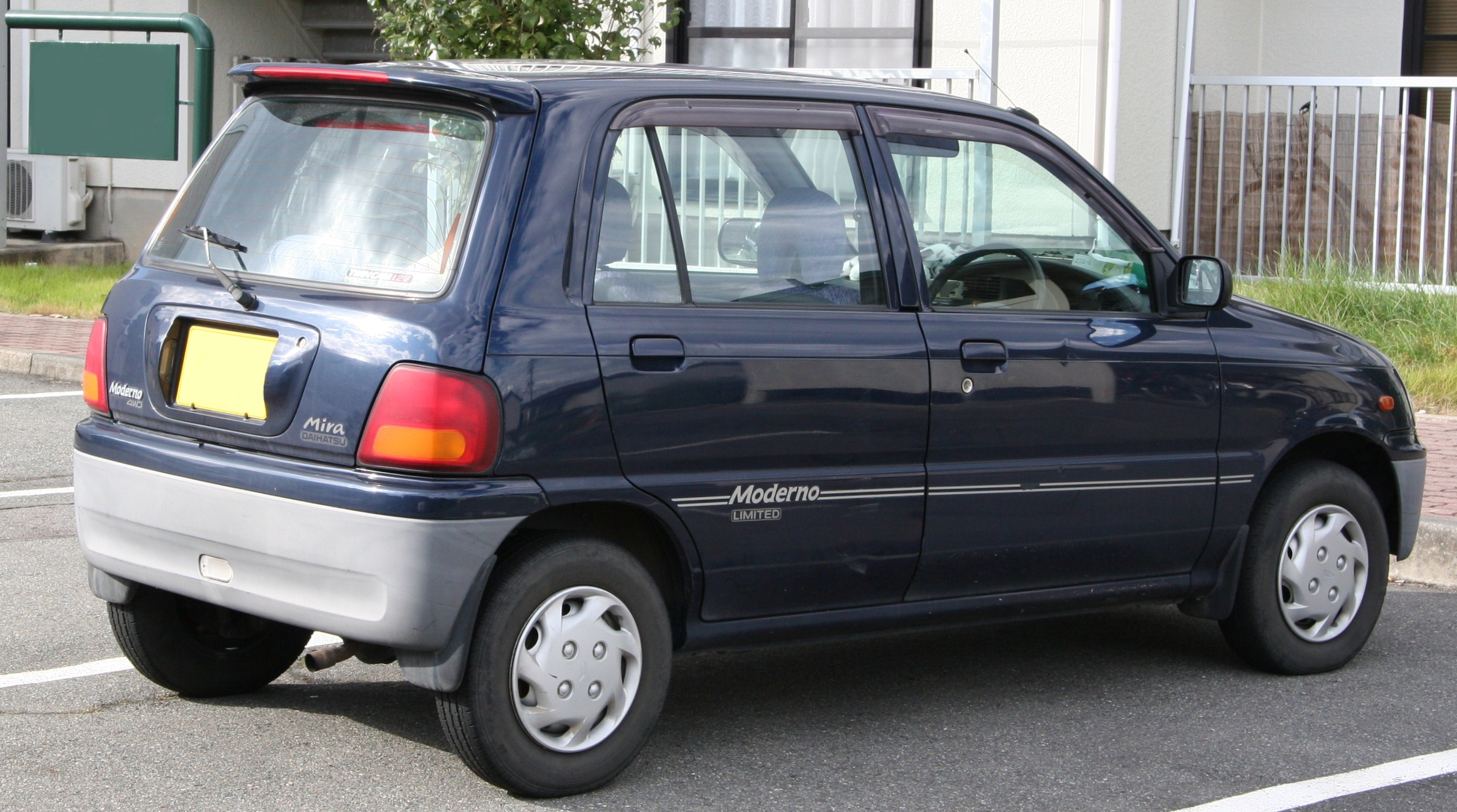
Facelifted Mira Moderno Limited 4WD (1996–98)

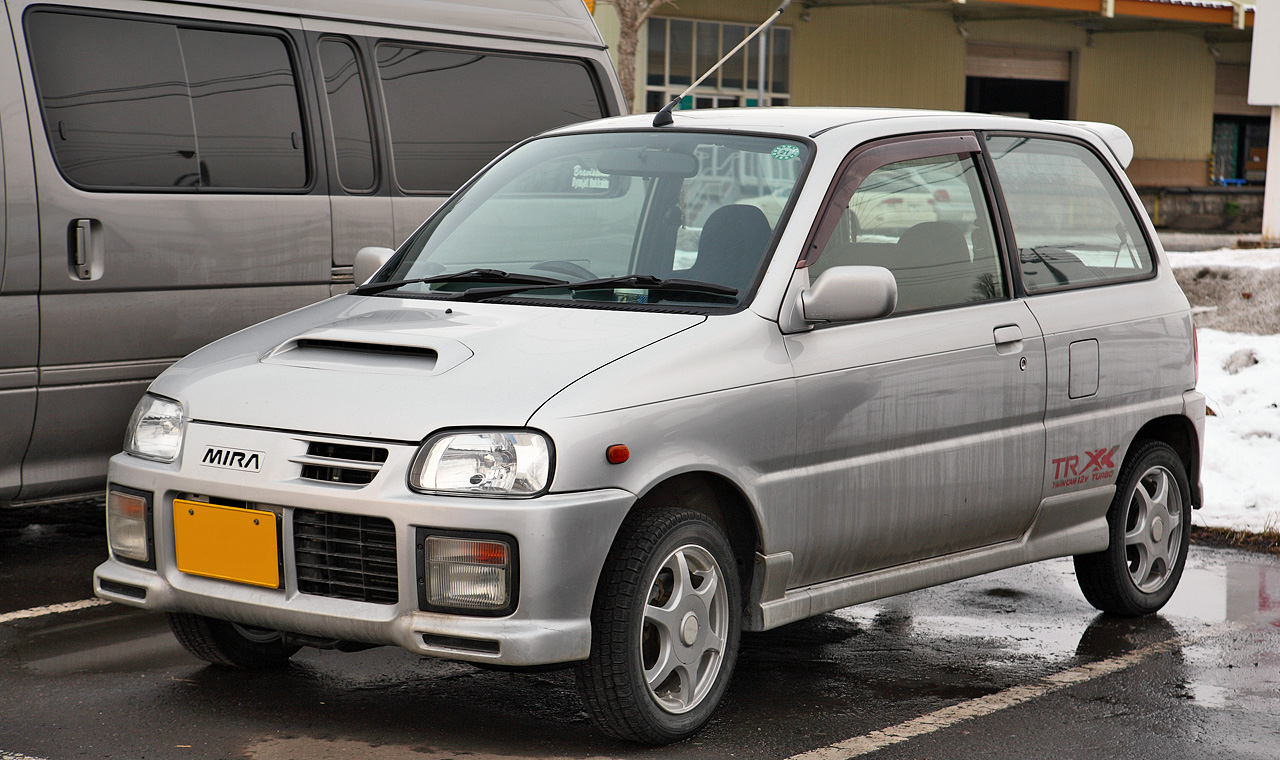
Facelifted Mira TR-XX Avanzato (1996–98)

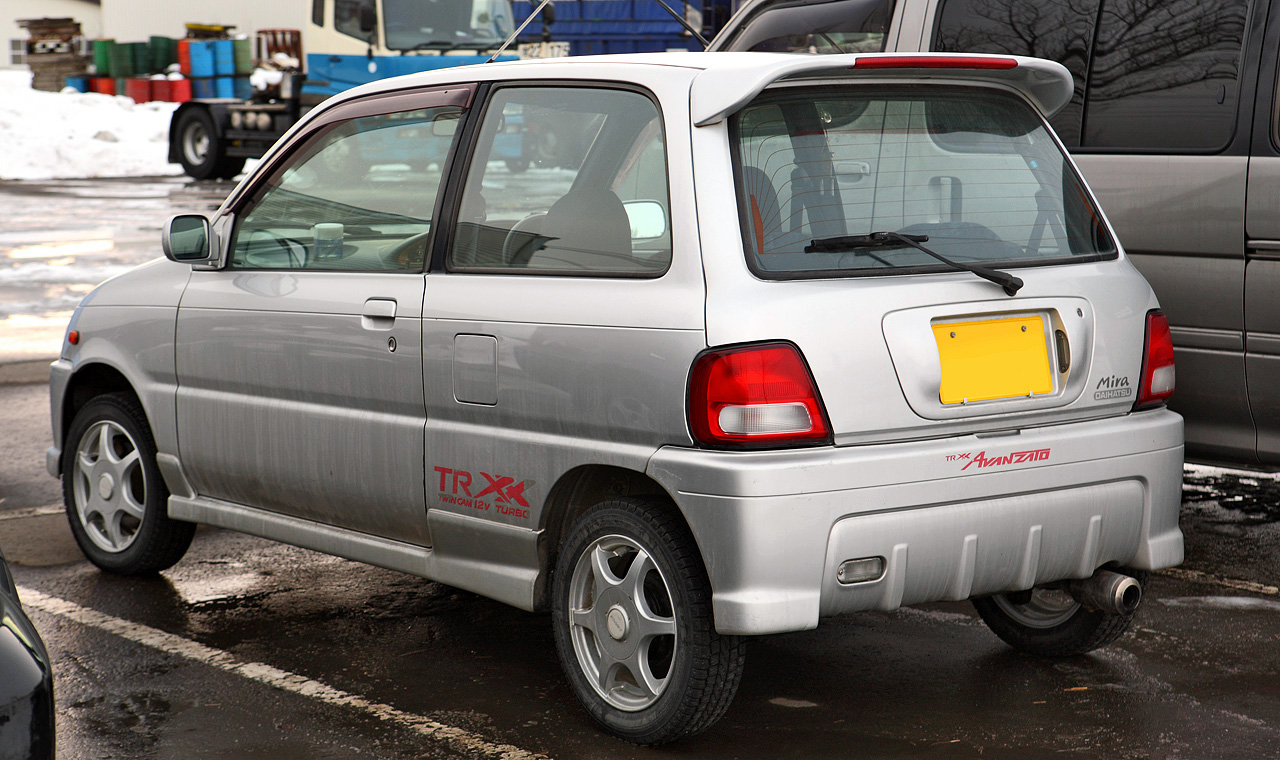
Facelifted Mira TR-XX Avanzato (1996–98)

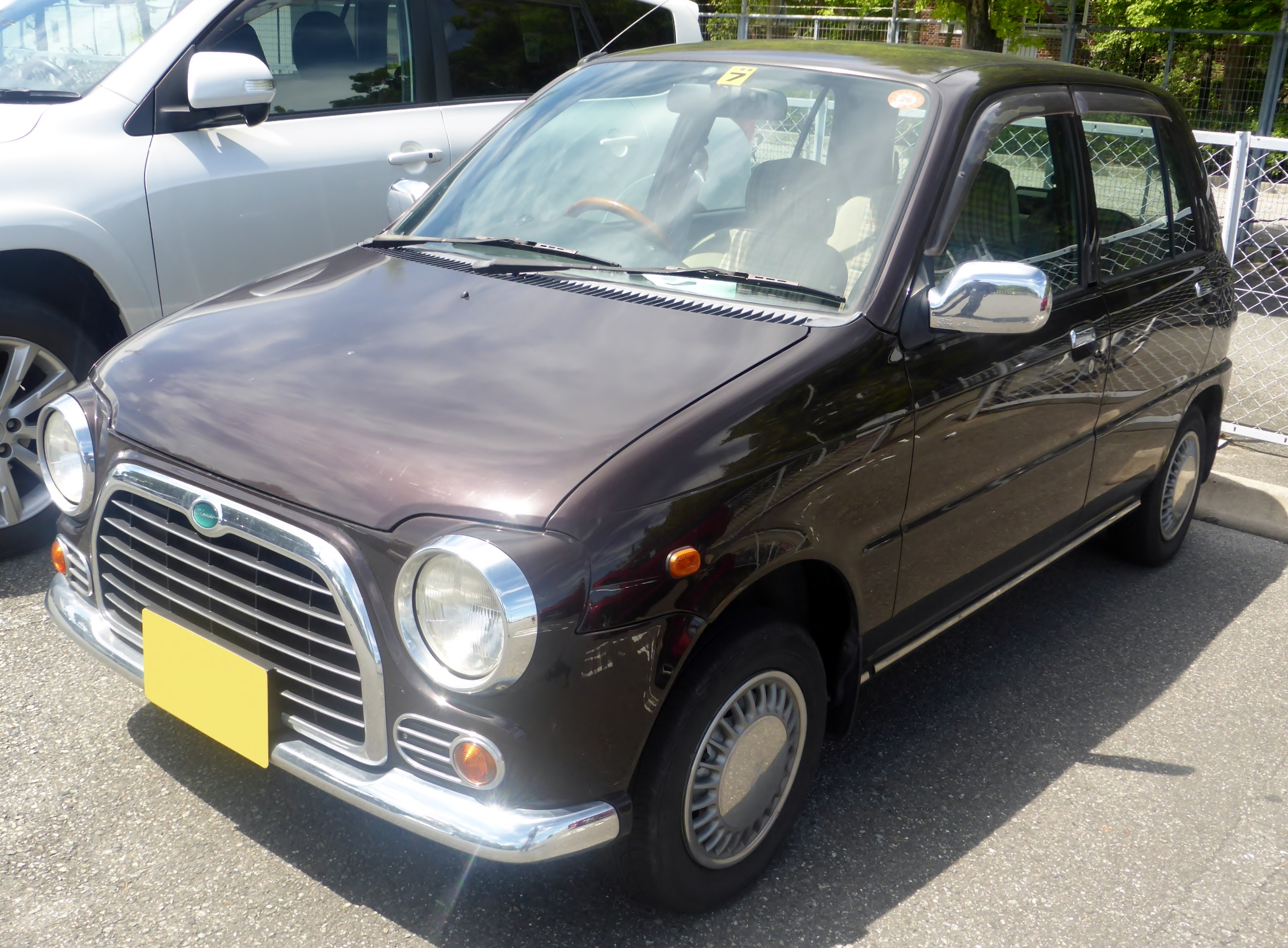
Daihatsu Mira Classic (1997–98)

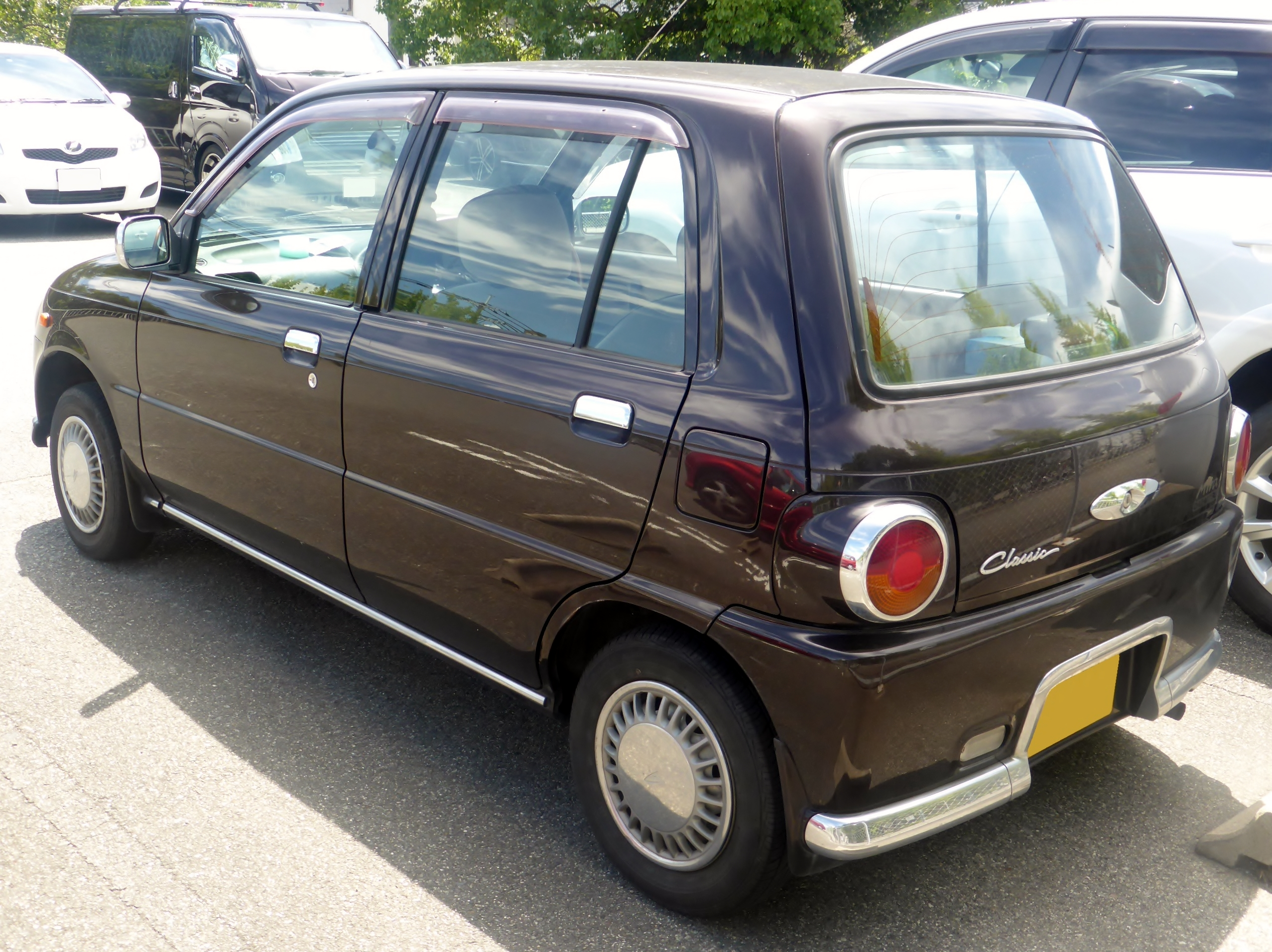
Daihatsu Mira Classic (1997–98)

== L700 series (1998) ==
Daihatsu Mira L700
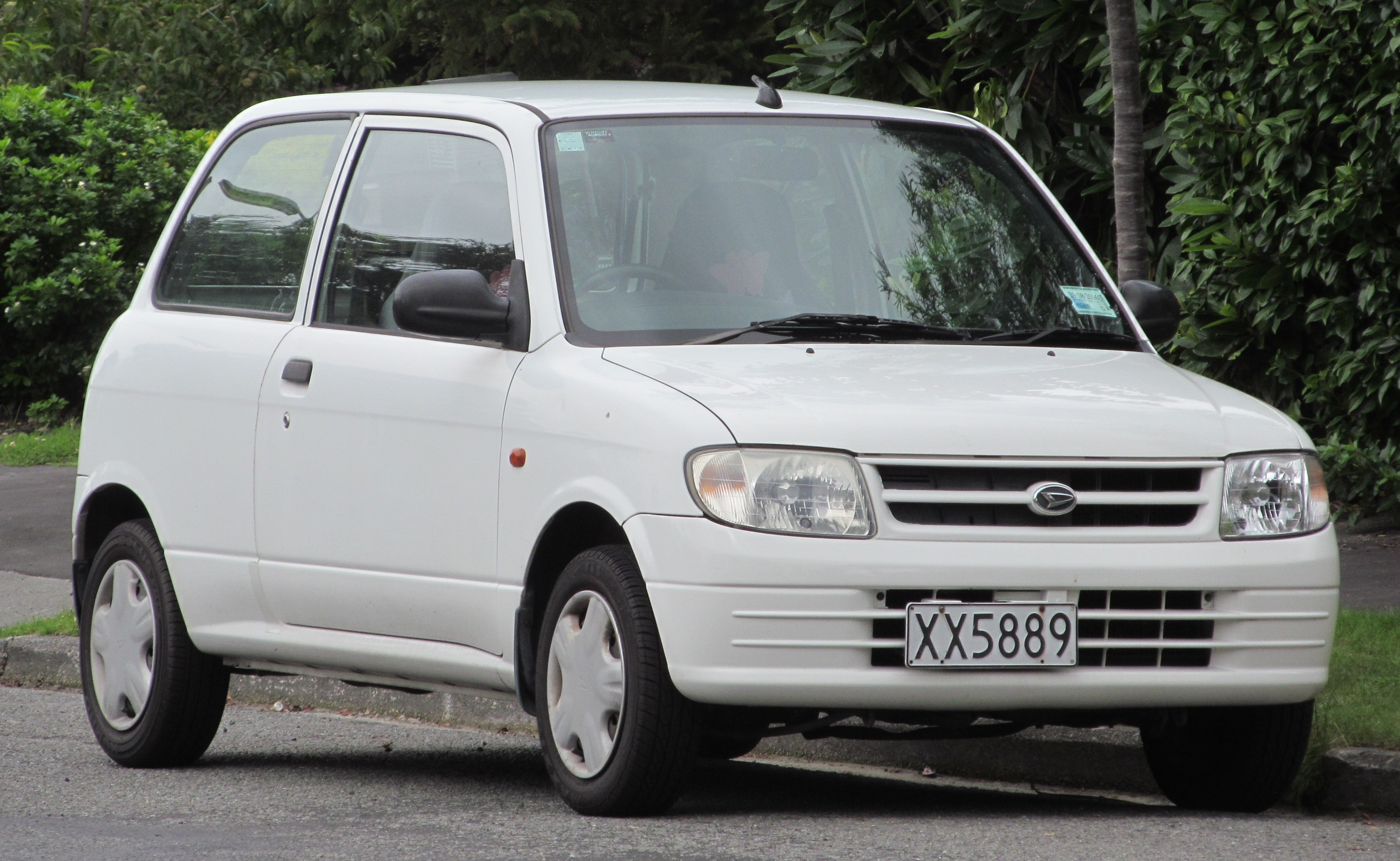
- 1999 Daihatsu Mira LS (New Zealand; pre-facelift)

Overview
- Also called: Daihatsu Cuore; Daihatsu Domino (Cyprus); Daihatsu Handivan; Perodua Kelisa (Malaysia)
- Production: October 1998 – December 2002; 2001–2007 (Perodua Kelisa)
- Assembly: Japan: Ikeda, Osaka; Malaysia: Rawang, Selangor (PMSB, Perodua Kelisa)

Body and chassis
- Body style: 3/5-door hatchback/van
- Related: Daihatsu Mira Gino (L700); Daihatsu Naked; Daihatsu Move (L900)

Powertrain
- Engine: 659 cc EF-SE I3 (L700/710); 659 cc EF-VE DOHC 12v I3 (L700/710); 659 cc EF-DET DOHC 12v turbo I3 (L700/710); 847 cc ED-DE I3; 989 cc EJ-DE/VE I3 (L701/711)
- Transmission: 5-speed manual 3/4-speed automatic CVT

Dimensions
- Wheelbase: 2,360 mm (92.9 in)
- Length: 3,395 mm (133.7 in)
- Width: 1,475 mm (58.1 in)
- Height: 1,425 mm (56.1 in)
- Curb weight: 670–810 kg (1,477–1,786 lb)

The fifth-generation Cuore received the chassis code L700, with L710 being used for four-wheel drive versions. The new model appeared in the fall of 1998. While the engines of cars sold in the domestic Japanese market had to stay beneath the 659-cc threshold, export versions (L701/711) received a new engine: the 989-cc EJ-DE was a 12-valve, DOHC, three-cylinder producing 56 PS (41 kW) at 5200 rpm. Also new for export models was the availability of a three-speed automatic. After a facelift in 2001, the car was equipped with a new, more powerful engine code EJ-VE engine with 58 PS (43 kW) and VVT-i. For some markets the previous, 850 cc ED-DE engine was retained.

The Japanese market Mira received fuel injected 659 cc engines from the EF family. Base models received an SOHC 6-valve engine with 45 PS (33 kW), upscale models had a 12-valve DOHC variant with DVVT and 58 PS (43 kW), and the sporty TR version received a turbocharged and intercooled derivative with double overhead cams and four valves per cylinder. Claimed power was 64 PS (47 kW); the maximum allowed for kei cars because of a gentlemen's agreement. In December 1998, the fuel-economy oriented TV model was introduced, fitted with CVT and a high compression version of the EF-VE engine producing 52 PS (38 kW) and allowing a fuel mileage of 27.0 km/L (3.7 L/100 km; 64 mpg_{‑US}) in the standard Japanese test cycle. In October 2000, the turbocharged Mira TR was discontinued (leaving only the Mira Gino to be fitted with the turbo engine), while the low-end EF-SE engine was upgraded and now produced 48 PS (35 kW).

=== Overseas production ===
Production of the L700 Mira was picked up in Malaysia in 2001, where it was sold alongside the Perodua Kancil as the Perodua Kelisa with the familiar Daihatsu E-series engines of 850 and 1,000 cc. Perodua ended production of the model in 2007.

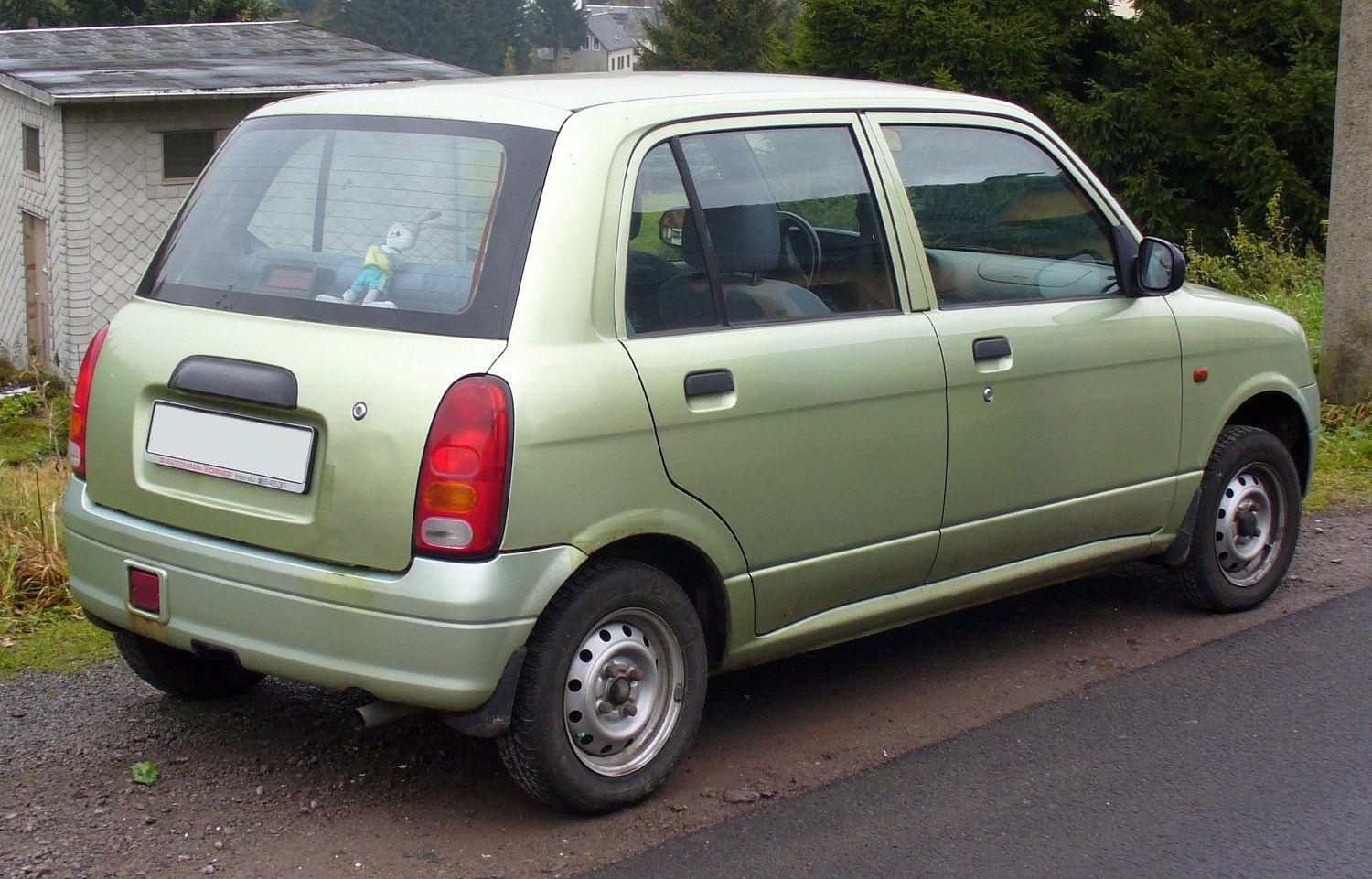
Cuore five-door (Europe; pre-facelift)

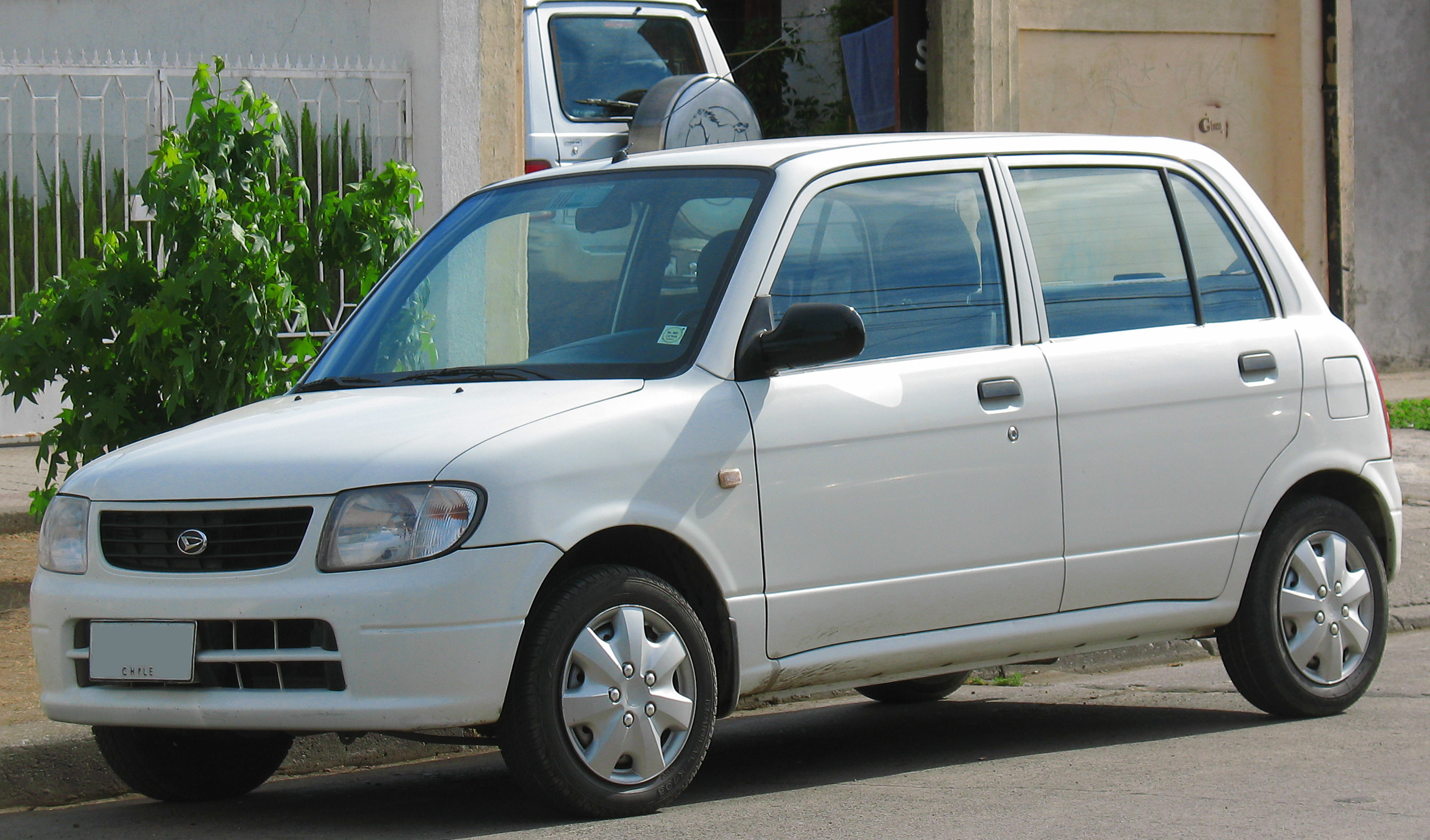
Cuore five-door (Chile; facelift)

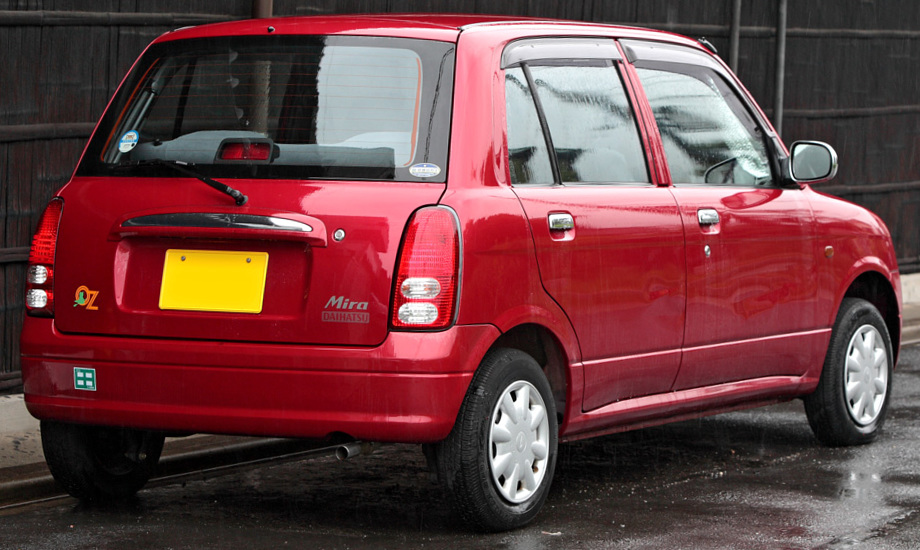
Mira five-door (Japan; facelift)

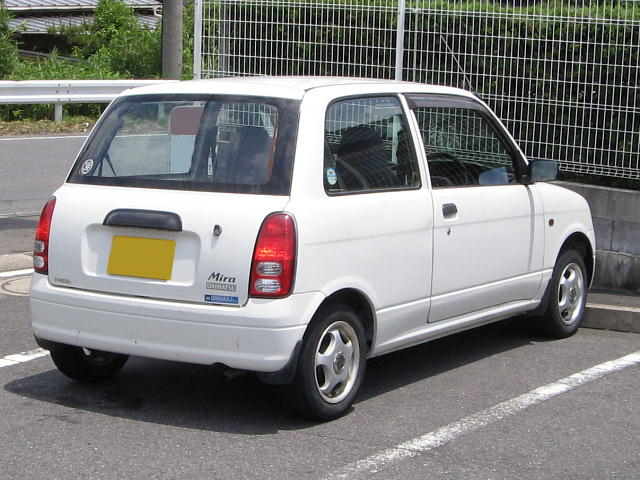
Mira three-door van (Japan; facelift)

=== Mira Gino ===
A retro version of the Daihatsu Mira based on the L700 platform began production in 1999, replacing the preceding Mira Classic. The Mira Gino received features and options similar to those of the regular variant, but was styled with a retro look. The Mira Gino was originally only offered with a 659-cc engine in Japan, but the 1-litre EJ-VE engine (as for the export market L700s) was briefly available in Japan as the Mira Gino 1000. A car based on the succeeding, second-generation Gino (which was a stand-alone lineup with its own model code of L650/L660) with a 1.0-L engine was sold as the Daihatsu Trevis in export markets.

== L250 series (2002) ==
Daihatsu Mira (L250/L260)
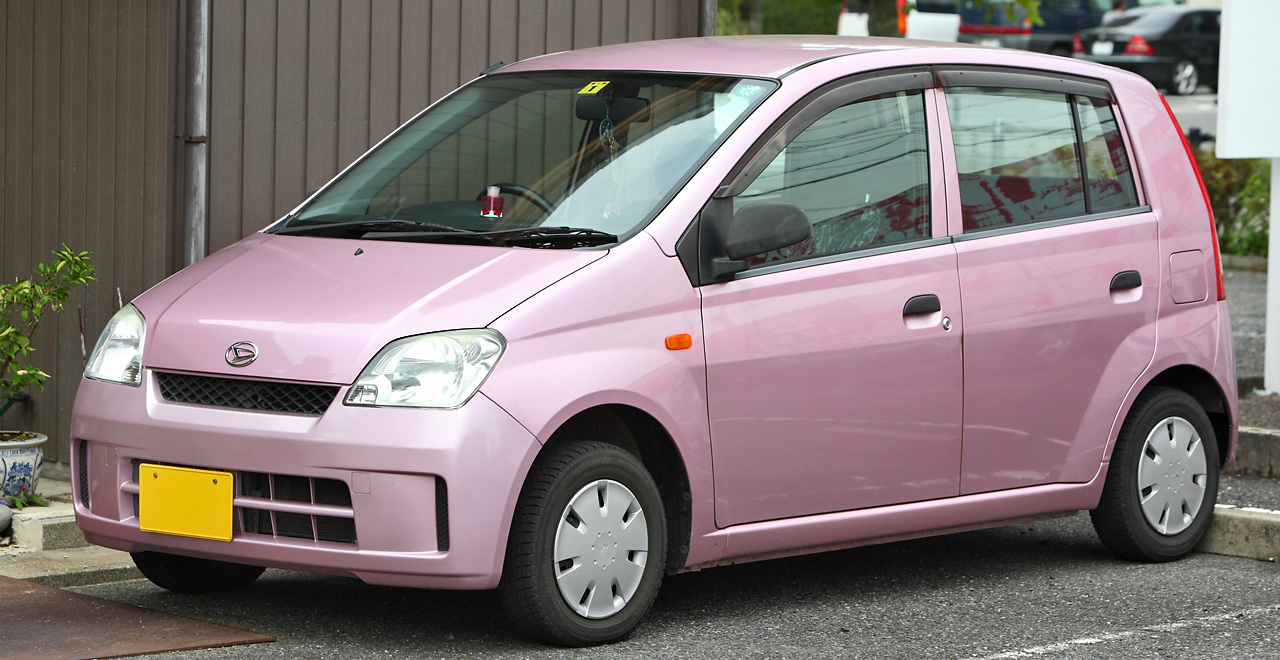
- Daihatsu Mira

Overview
- Also called: Daihatsu Charade; Daihatsu Cuore; Perodua Viva (Malaysia)
- Production: December 2002 – December 2006; November 2005 – August 2009 (Mira Friend-Matic); May 2007 – September 2014 (Perodua Viva)
- Assembly: Japan: Ikeda, Osaka; Malaysia: Rawang, Selangor (PMSB, Perodua Viva)

Body and chassis
- Body style: 3/5-door hatchback/van
- Related: Daihatsu Mira Gino (L650); Daihatsu Move (L150)

Powertrain
- Engine: 659 cc EF I3; 989 cc EJ I3
- Transmission: 5-speed manual 3/4-speed automatic or CVT

Dimensions
- Wheelbase: 2,390 mm (94.1 in)
- Length: 3,395 mm (133.7 in)
- Width: 1,475 mm (58.1 in)
- Height: 1,500 mm (59.1 in)
- Curb weight: 700–770 kg (1,543–1,698 lb)

The L250/L260 Mira, unrelated to the earlier 200-series, is the sixth generation of the car. It is produced as the Mira in Japan. The L250 was labeled Daihatsu Charade in the United Kingdom, South Africa, Australia and Gulf States. Elsewhere, this was badged and sold as the Cuore. Export versions, equipped with the 1.0-litre EJ engine as first seen in the previous generation, are L251, while L260 is used on four-wheel drive versions (for the Japanese domestic market only). After the sixth-generation Mira was replaced in late 2006, the production line was shifted to Malaysia, where production of this car as the Perodua Viva commenced in May 2007.

In Japan, a sportier Mira Avy version also is available. The range underwent a very minor facelift in August 2005. A special needs-friendly (Mira Friend-Matic) version appeared in November 2005. This car could be driven directly from a special self-powered wheelchair (the Mira Self-Matic), with a driver's door that could open at 90° and a fully automated entry and exit system. Buyers of the Self-Matic would receive government assistance. The Friend-Matic version continued to be available until August 2009, long after the rest of the L250 range had been replaced.

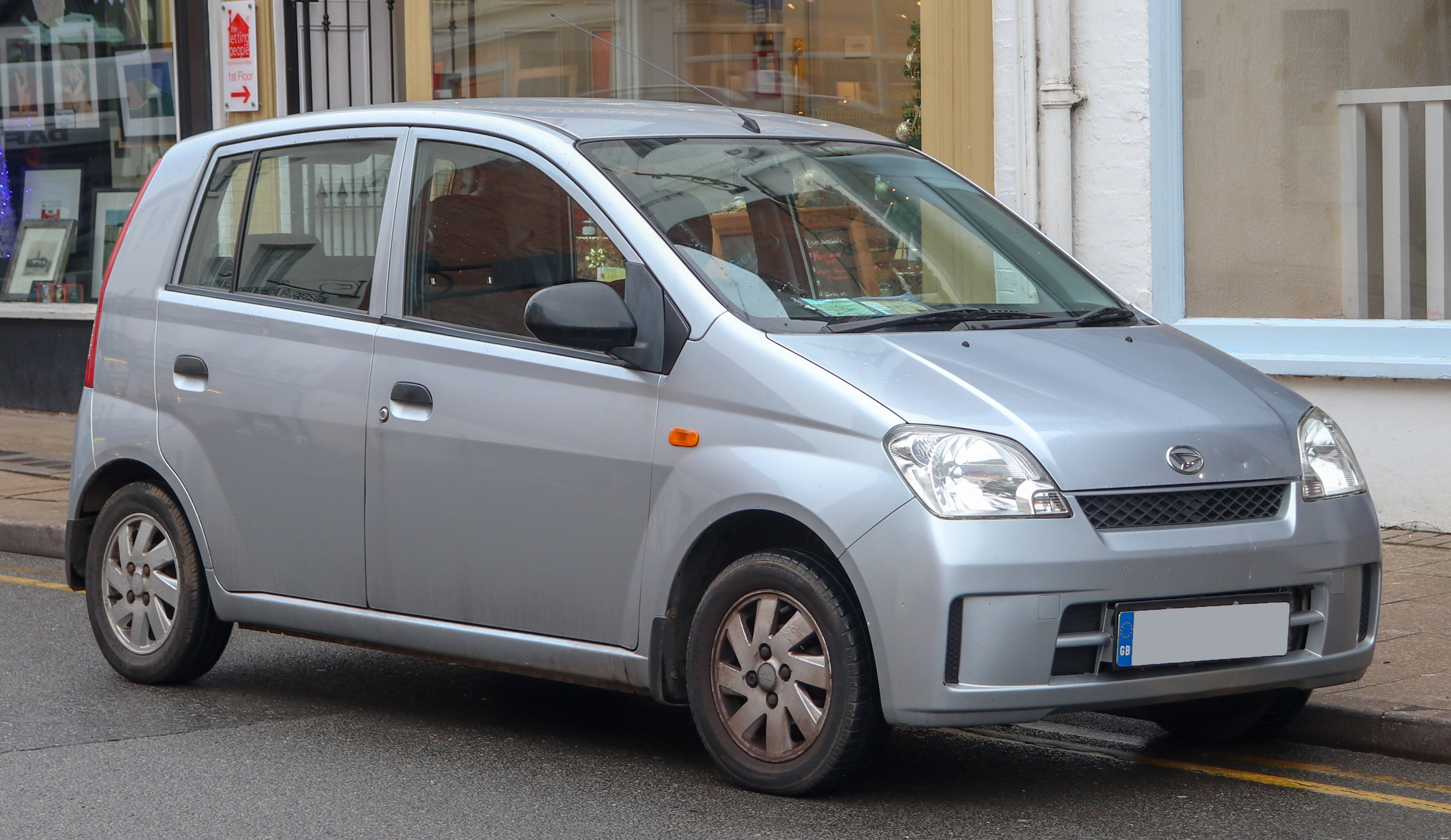
2004 Daihatsu Charade SL (UK)

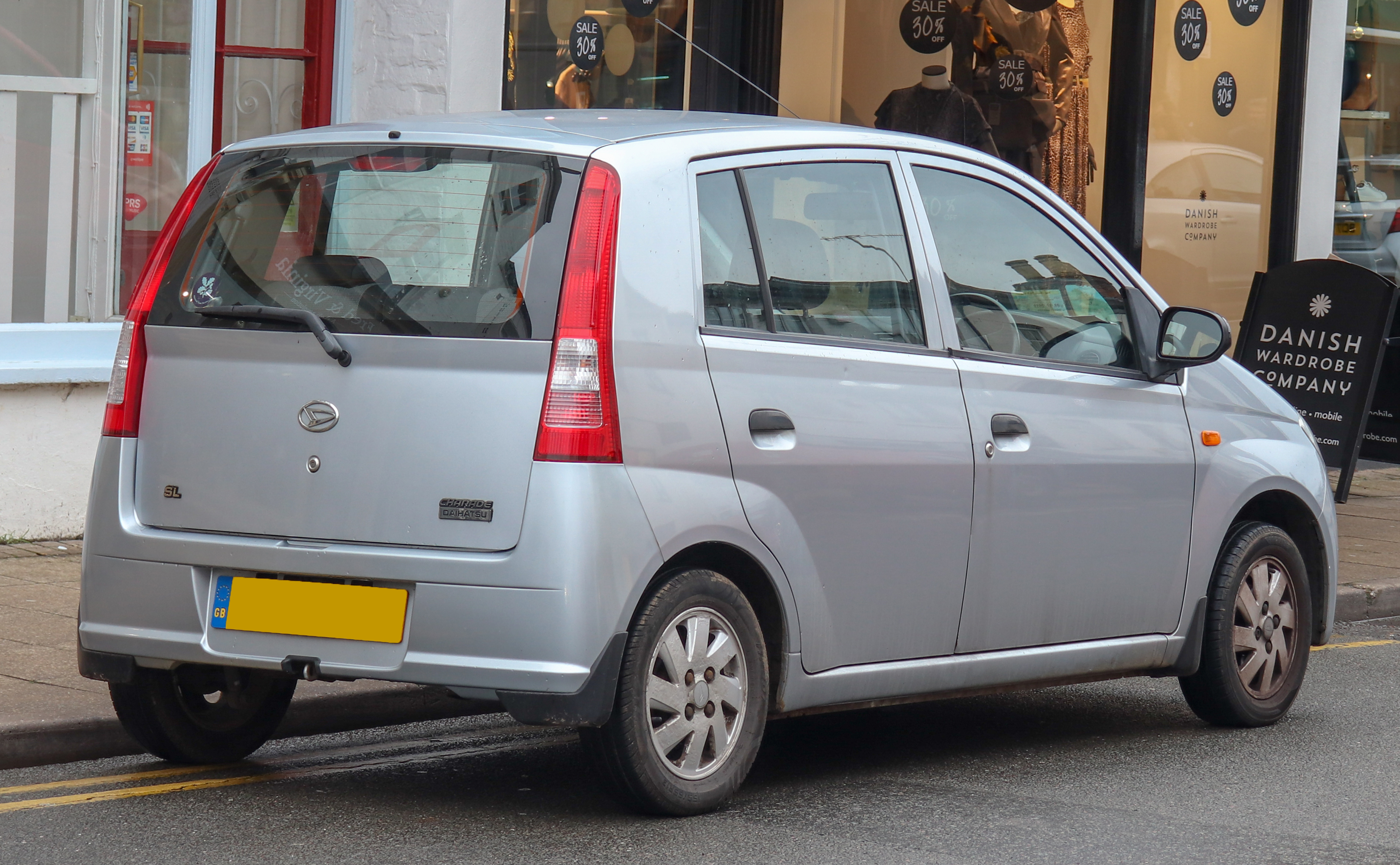
2004 Daihatsu Charade SL (UK)

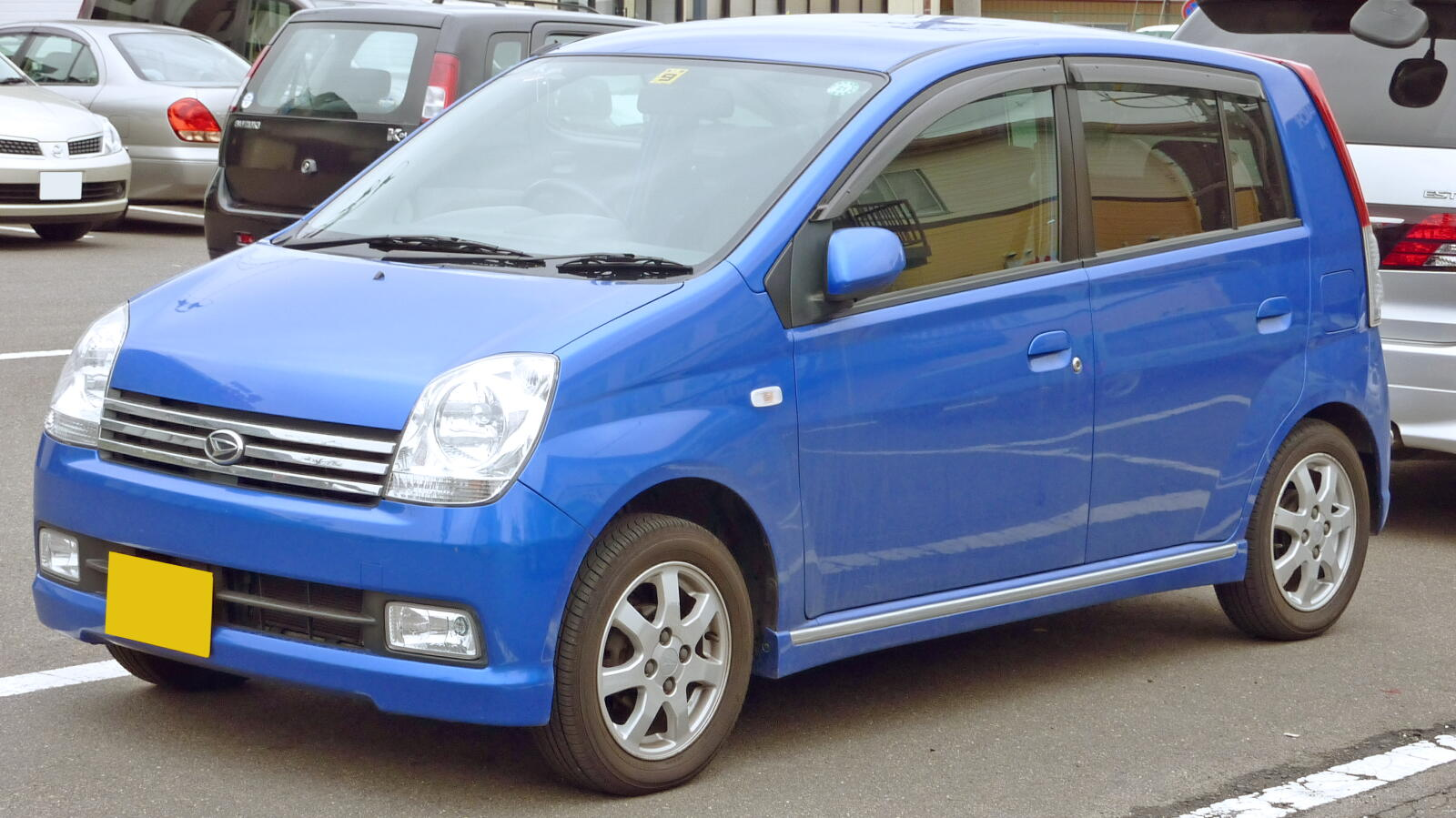
Daihatsu Mira Avy

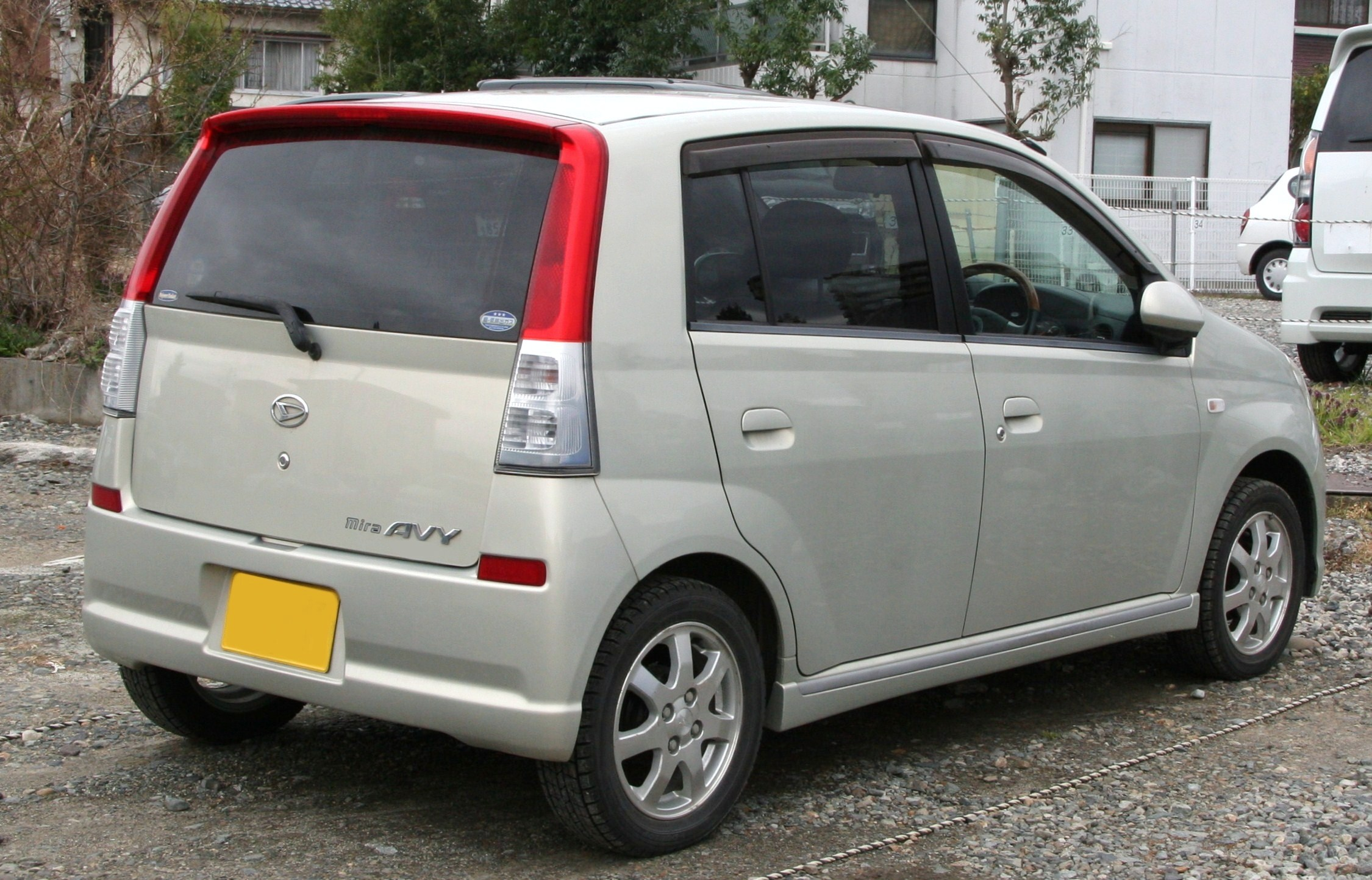
Daihatsu Mira Avy

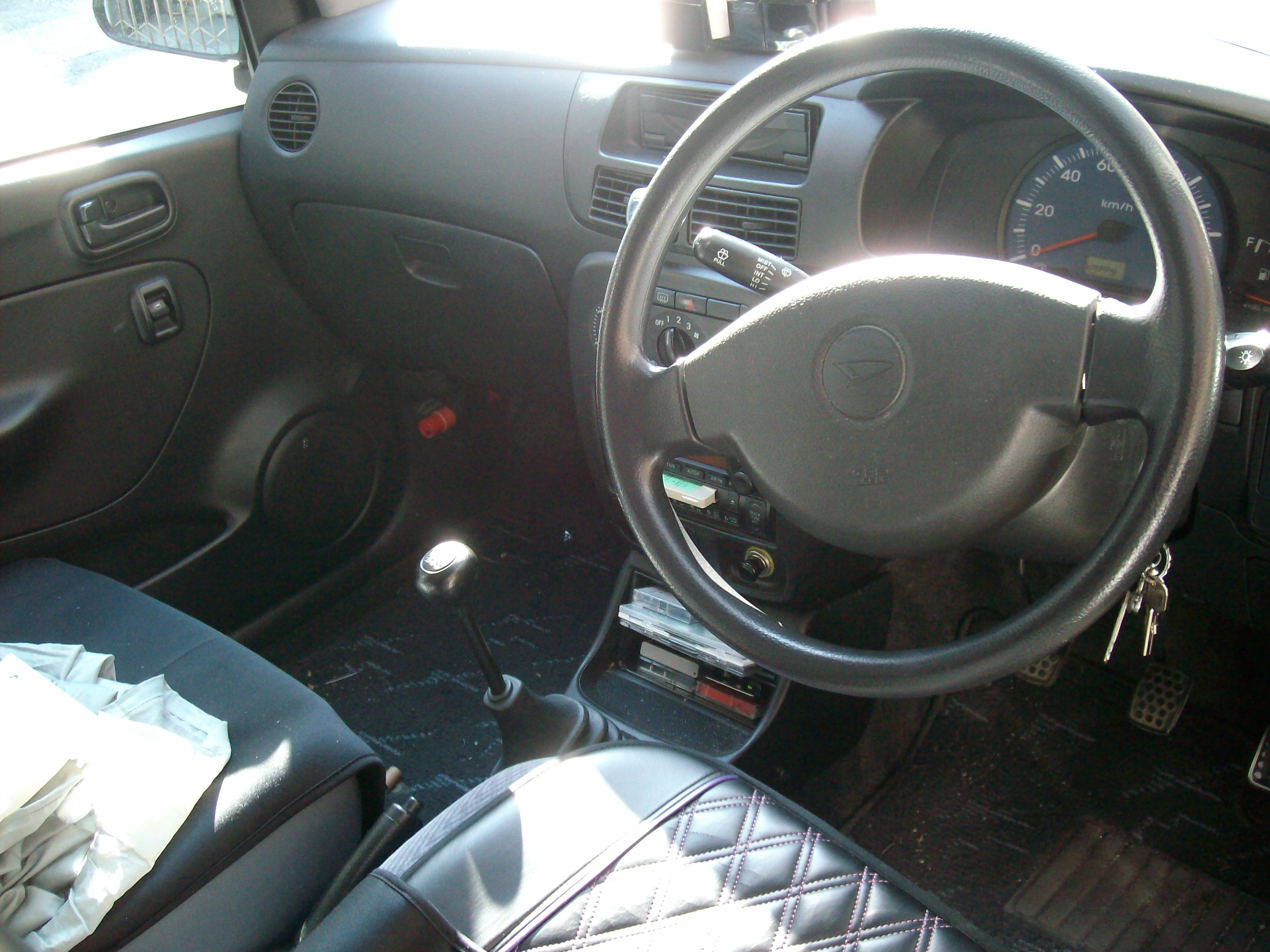
Interior

== L275 series (2006) ==
Daihatsu Mira L275/L285
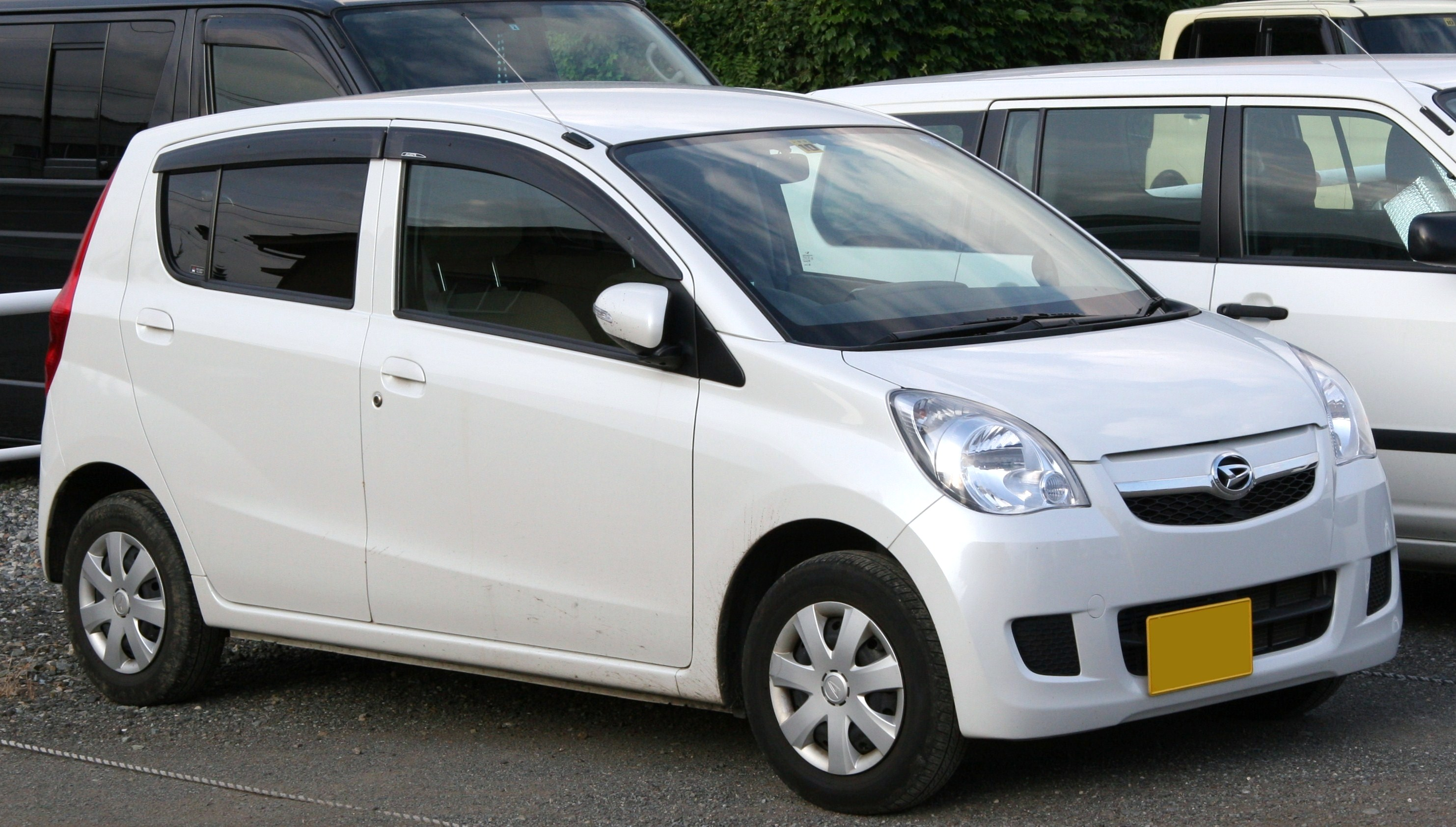
- Daihatsu Mira X five-door

Overview
- Model code: L275/276/285
- Also called: Daihatsu Charade (South Africa); Daihatsu Cuore (Europe)
- Production: December 2006 – March 2018
- Assembly: Japan: Osaka
- Designer: Yukinobu Morioka, Akira Sakabe and Jirou Matsueda

Body and chassis
- Body style: 3-door hatchback/van 5-door hatchback
- Related: Daihatsu Mira Cocoa; Daihatsu Esse; Daihatsu Move (L175)

Powertrain
- Engine: 658 cc KF-VE I3; 658 cc KF-DET Turbo I3; 996 cc 1KR-FE I3 (export)
- Transmission: 5-speed manual 3/4-speed automatic CVT

Dimensions
- Wheelbase: 2,490 mm (98.0 in)
- Length: 3,395 mm (133.7 in); 3,470 mm (136.6 in) (Cuore/Charade)
- Width: 1,475 mm (58.1 in)
- Height: 1,540 mm (60.6 in); 1,530 mm (60.2 in) (Cuore/Charade)
- Curb weight: 820 kg (1,808 lb)

In December 2006, the L275, the seventh-generation Mira, was presented. Initially only available as a passenger version with a five-door body, the three-door van derivative appeared in December 2007. As usual, four-wheel drive versions received a different model code (L285). Two Topaz Neo KF engines are available: a 658-cc KF-VE twin-cam, DVVT, three-cylinder engine of 43 kW (58 PS), and the KF-DET turbo engine of same displacement that produces 47 kW (64 PS). The naturally aspirated engine is available with five-speed manual transmission, three- or four-speed automatic transmission or continuously variable transmission. Export models (L276) first appeared in September 2007 and receive the very light Toyota KR engine, an inline-three of 1.0-litre displacement.

Under the Japanese 10–15 test cycle, fuel economy varies from 21 km/L (59 mpg_{‑imp}; 49 mpg_{‑US}) for three-speed automatic transmissions to 25.5 km/L (72 mpg_{‑imp}; 60 mpg_{‑US}) for continuously variable transmissions. For cars with the "Smart Drive package", which come with a new idle start-stop system, fuel economy increases to 27 km/L (76 mpg_{‑imp}; 64 mpg_{‑US}).

Inside, the gear shift has been moved from between the front seats to centre dash. An optional sliding rear seat, with a range of 255 mm, allows for more luggage room or extra knee room.

Sales of the export 1.0-litre model in South Africa (as Daihatsu Charade) ended in 2011, followed by the European version (Daihatsu Cuore) in 2013.

The Mira, alongside the Mira Cocoa, was discontinued in Japan on 30 March 2018 as it would not be able to pass upcoming safety standards. With it, Daihatsu left the bonneted light van market, where it had been represented by the Mira for 38 years.

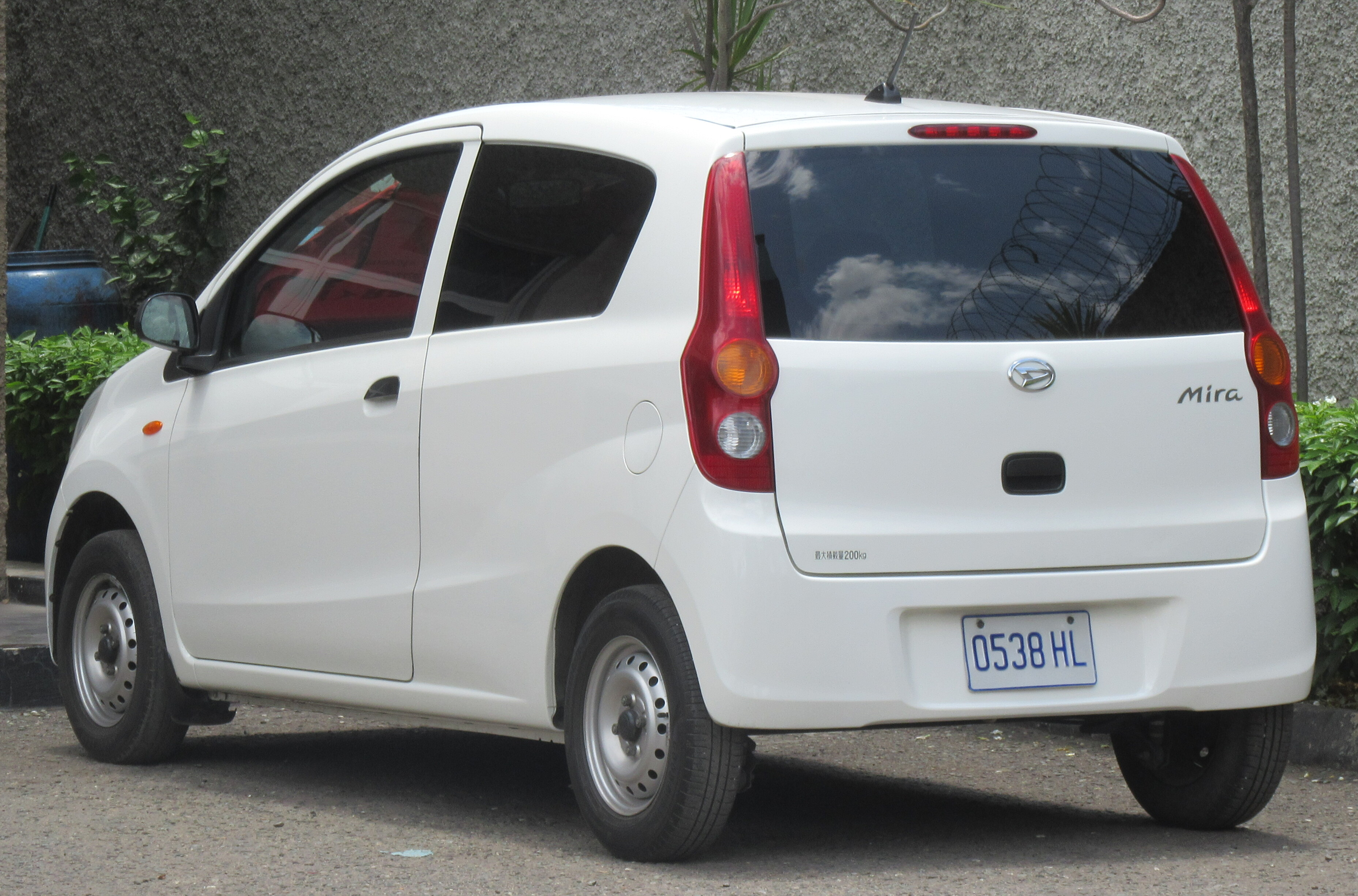
Daihatsu Mira Van TX three-door

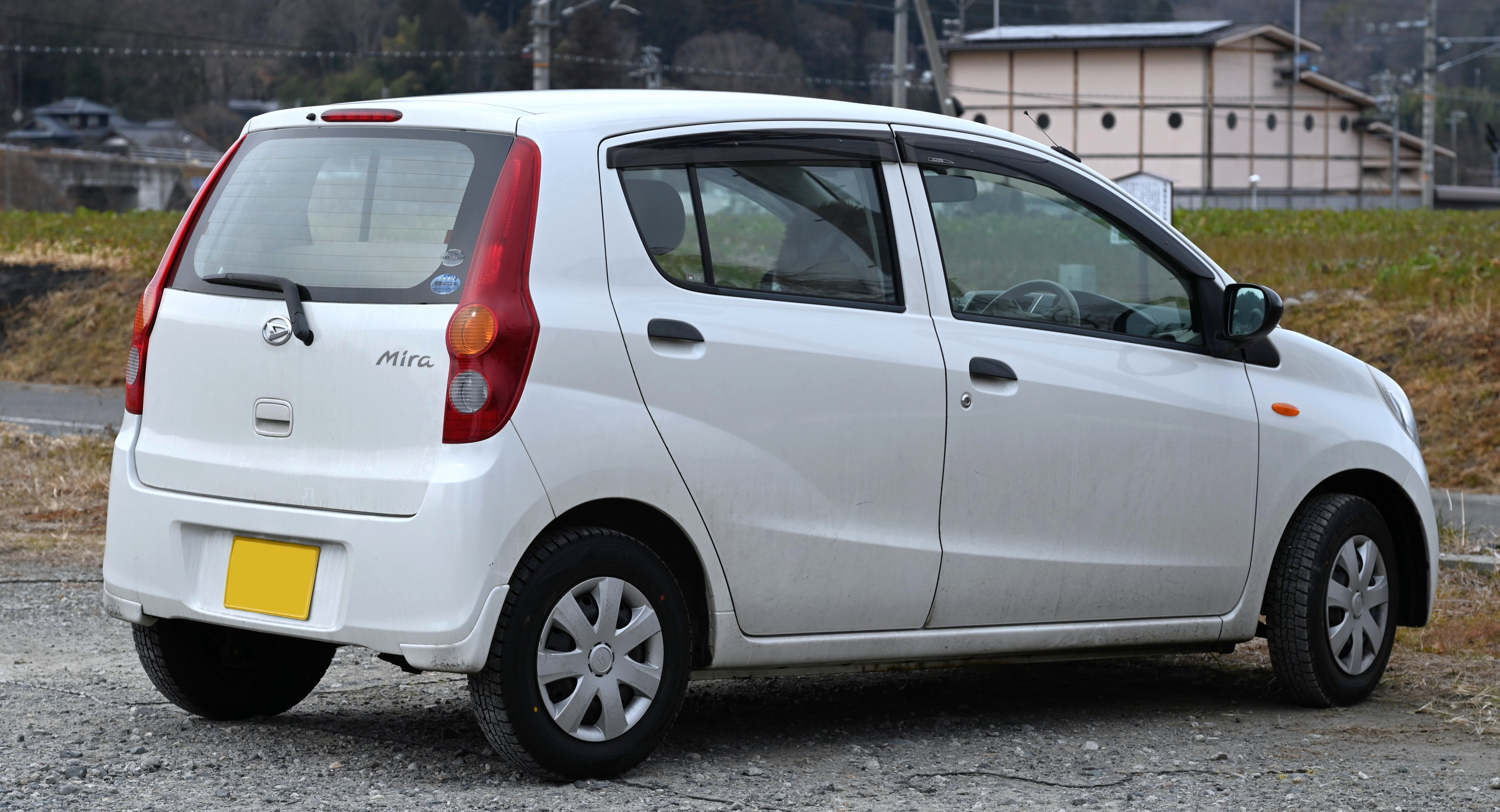
Daihatsu Mira X five-door

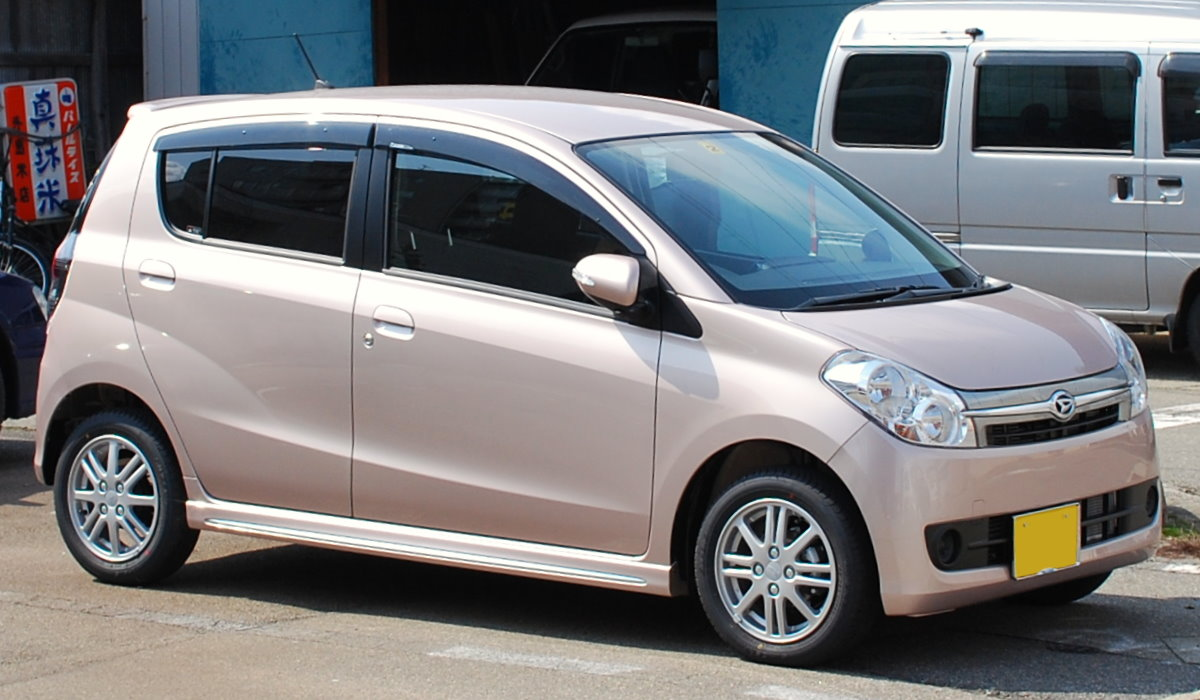
2008 Daihatsu Mira Custom

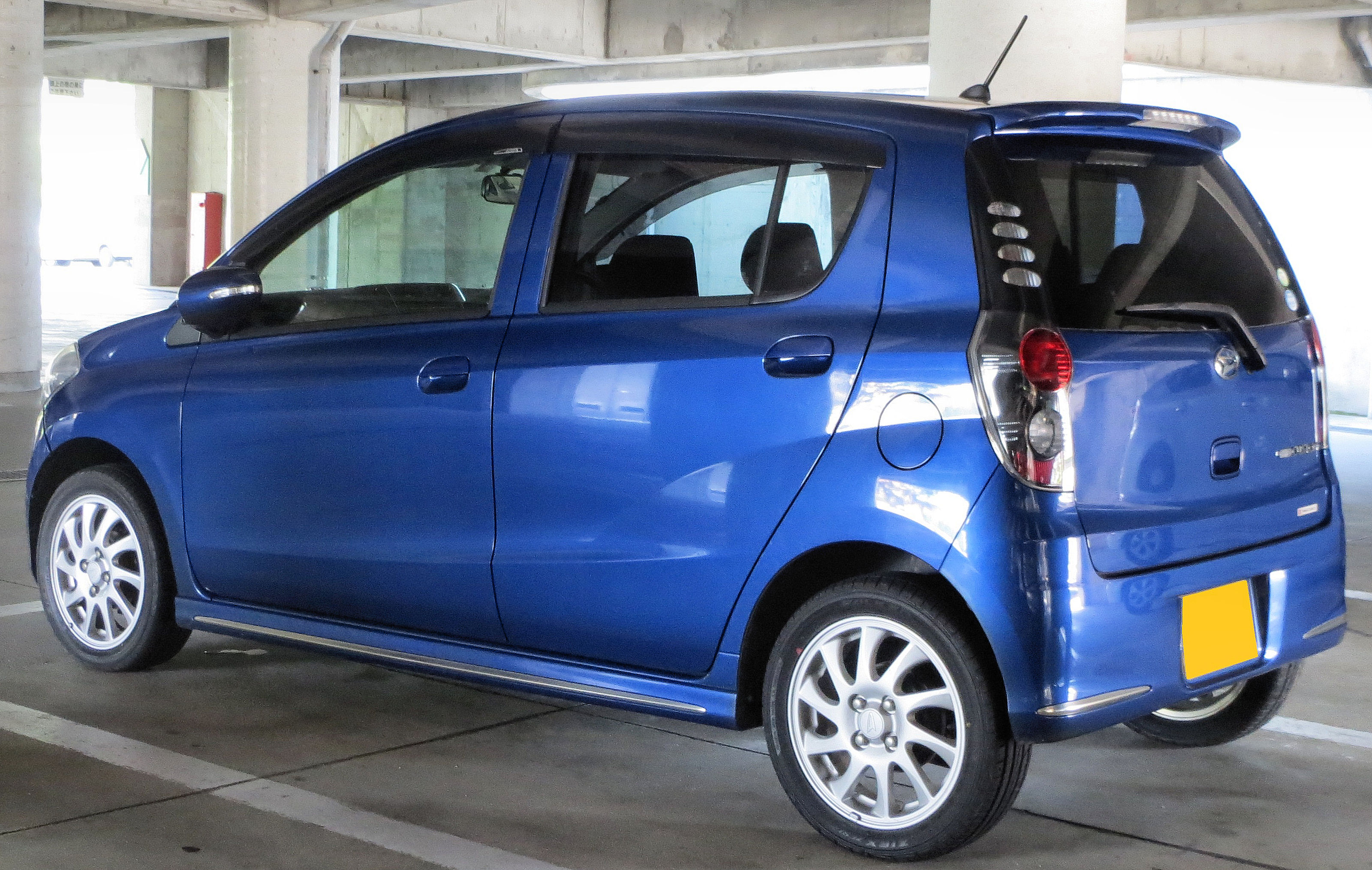
Daihatsu Mira Custom RS

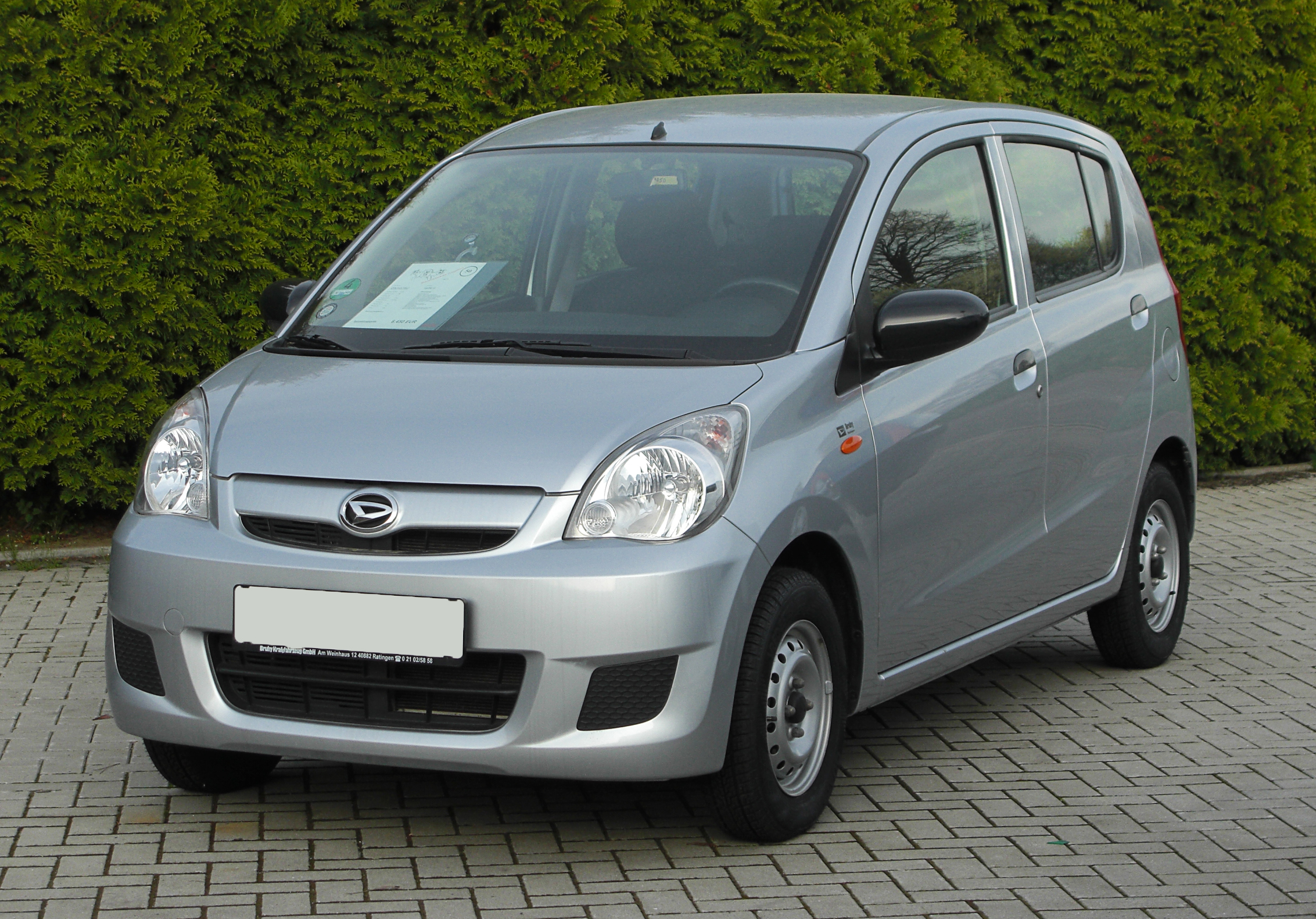
Daihatsu Cuore (Germany) with longer front bumper

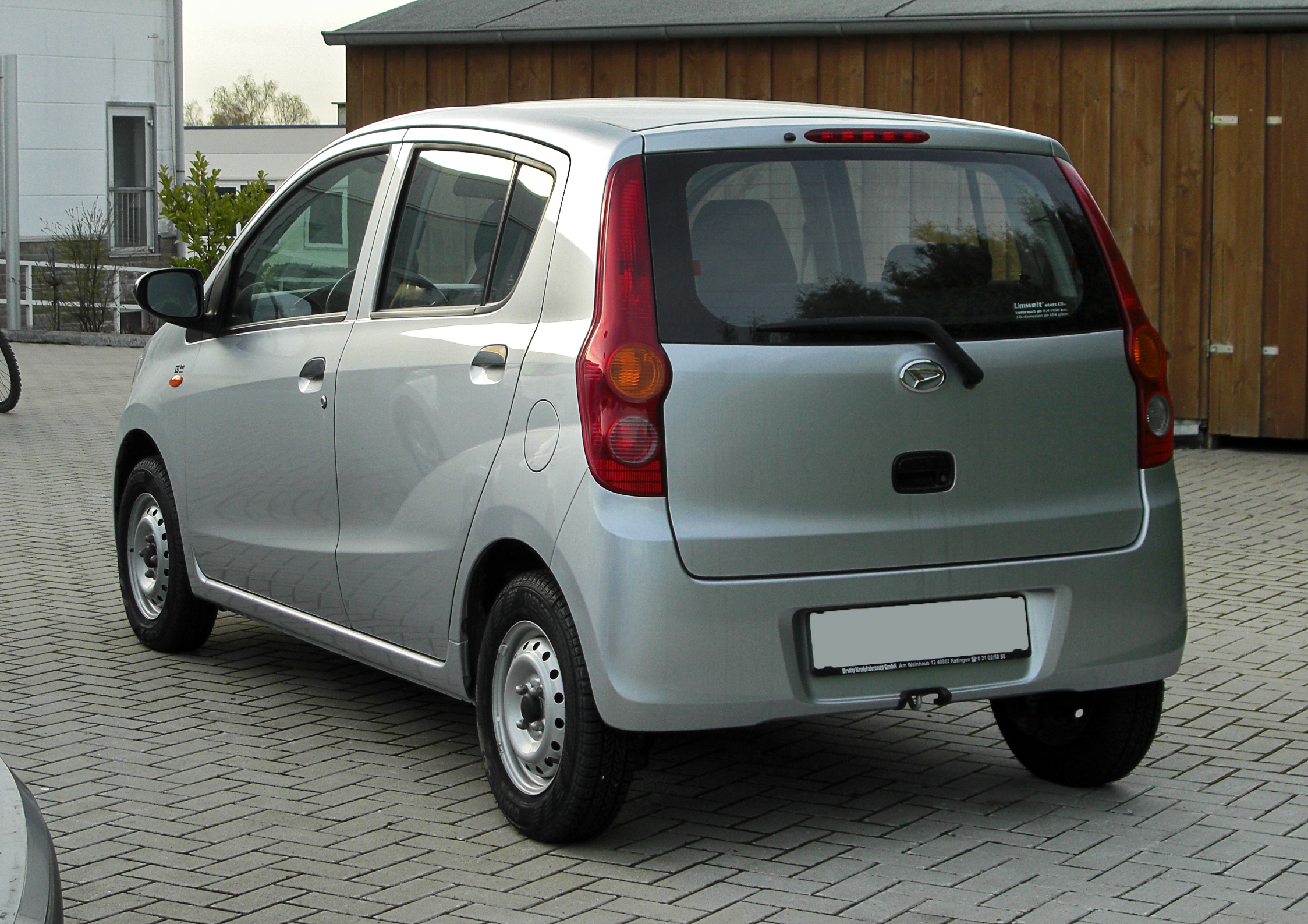
Daihatsu Cuore (Germany)

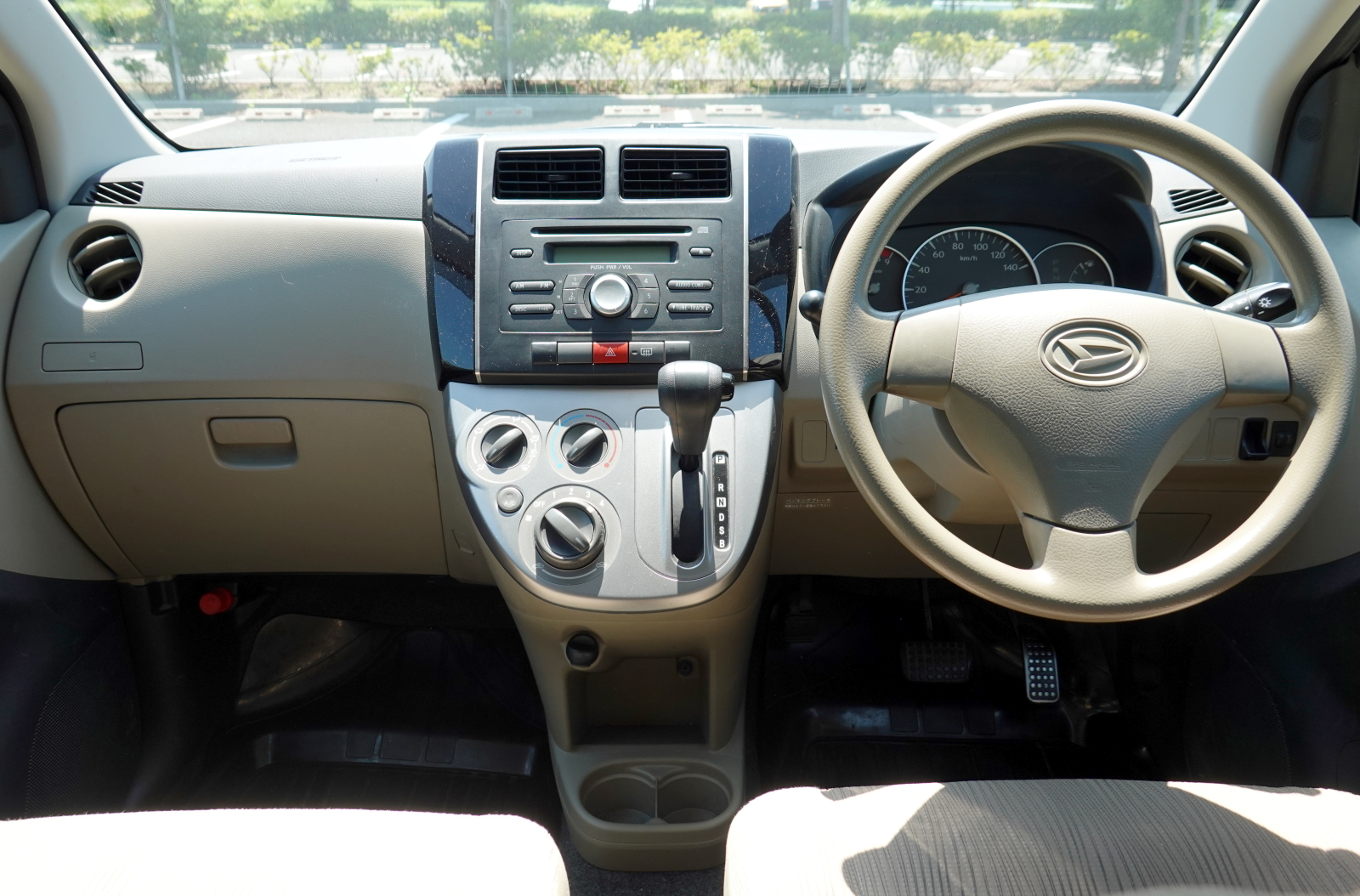
Interior

== In popular culture ==
- The Mira TR-XX appears alongside several of its kei sports-car contemporaries in Kat's Run: Zen-Nippon K Car Senshuken for the Super Famicom.
- The YouTube channel show Mighty Car Mods featured multiple L700 Cuores, namely a blue-colored, two-door 2002 Daihatsu Mira, which due to severe neglected state it was found in when bought by one of the show's hosts, was affectionately called "The Blue Turd". Despite the nickname, subsequent modifications (including an engine swap from a larger Daihatsu Sirion) have elevated the model's reputation among affordable DIY car enthusiasts who watch the show. An L200 Mira TR-XX was used in their film Kei To The City. In season 9, they imported the Mira as a "halfcut", due to Australian import regulations preventing it being brought into the country as a working car. Using an Australian-bought Mira as a base car, and as much of the Japanese halfcut Mira as possible, the duo were aiming to recreate the TR-XX in Australia. The car was finally finished and revealed on 8 September 2019.
- The car was also reviewed by Jeremy Clarkson on Top Gear.

== See also ==
- Perodua Kancil - a rebadged third-generation of Daihatsu Mira (based on L200 chassis)
- Perodua Kelisa - a rebadged fifth-generation of Daihatsu Mira (based on L700 chassis)
- Perodua Viva – a rebadged sixth-generation of Daihatsu Mira (based on L250 chassis)
- Perodua Axia – heavily inspired by the Daihatsu Mira e:S
- Lada Oka - heavily inspired by the Daihatsu Mira
