= Daihatsu Ayla =

City car produced by Daihatsu

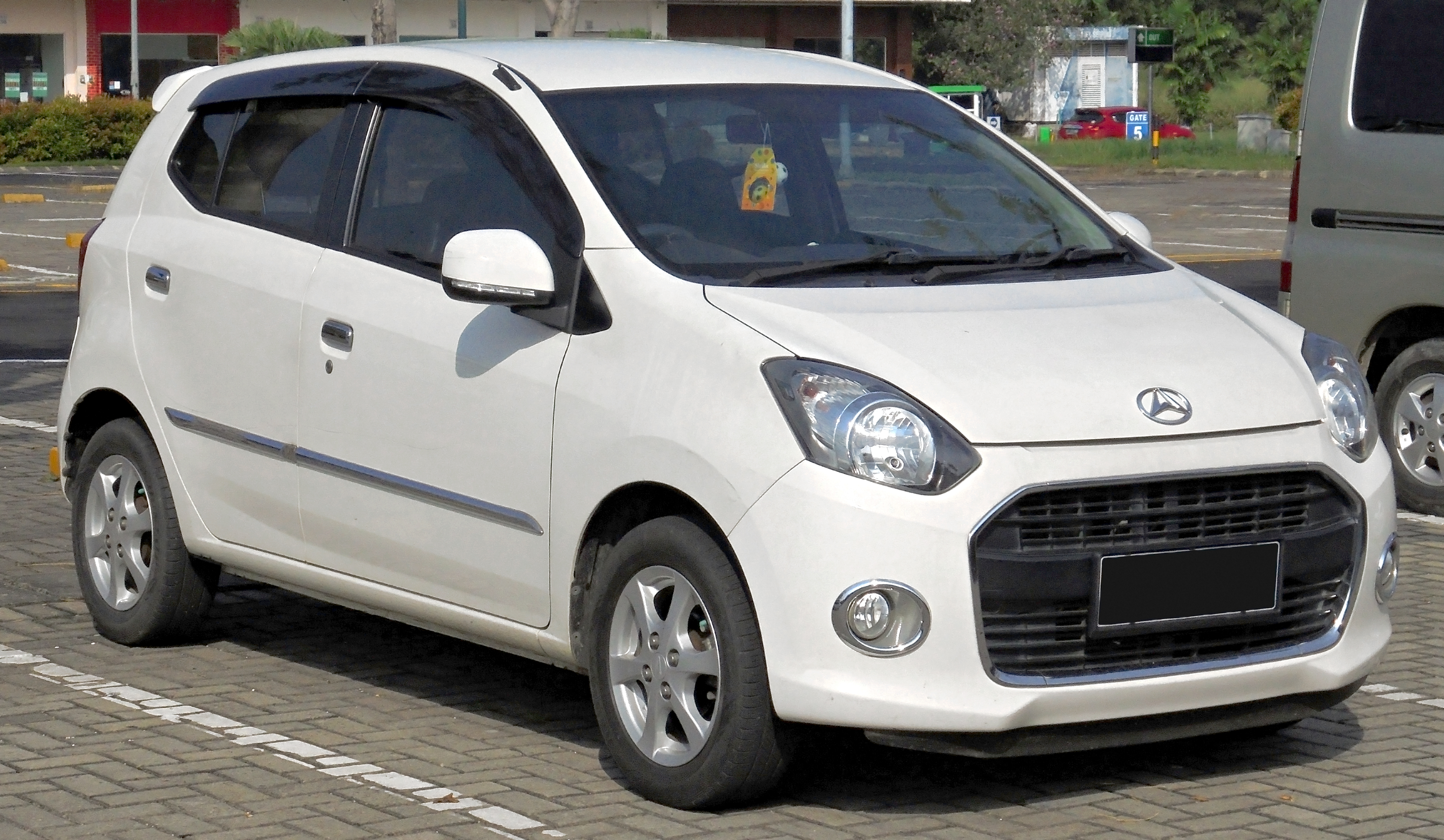
- 2014 Daihatsu Ayla 1.0 X (B100RS, Indonesia)

Overview
- Manufacturer: Daihatsu
- Also called: Toyota Agya; Toyota Wigo; Perodua Axia
- Production: September 2013 – present
- Assembly: Indonesia: Karawang, West Java (ADM)

Body and chassis
- Class: City car (A)
- Body style: 5-door hatchback
- Layout: Front-engine, front-wheel-drive

The Daihatsu Ayla is a city car designed by Daihatsu and manufactured by Astra Daihatsu Motor in Indonesia since 2013, primarily developed for emerging markets. The Ayla has also been sold by Toyota (Daihatsu's parent company since 2016) as the Toyota Agya in Indonesia, South Africa, Tunisia and Americas (except North America), and the Toyota Wigo in the Philippines, Sri Lanka, Brunei and Vietnam through an OEM agreement. The car is also slightly reengineered and manufactured in Malaysia by Perodua as the Perodua Axia.

The first-generation Ayla and Agya were first unveiled at the 20th Indonesia International Motor Show in September 2012 and went on sale a year later, in September 2013. The second-generation models were unveiled in February 2023 and went on sale a month afterwards.

The name Ayla was taken from the Sanskrit word meaning 'light', while Agya means 'fast'. The name was chosen to comply with the Indonesian government-endorsed Low Cost Green Car (LCGC) tax exemption program which requires an Indonesian-inspired name. The program also requires for an Indonesian-inspired badge to be used, with the Ayla using an A-shaped front logo while the Agya for the Indonesian market opting for a Garuda-inspired front badge (except for the second-generation Agya GR Sport which is not eligible for the LCGC program).

== First generation (B100; 2013) ==
First generation
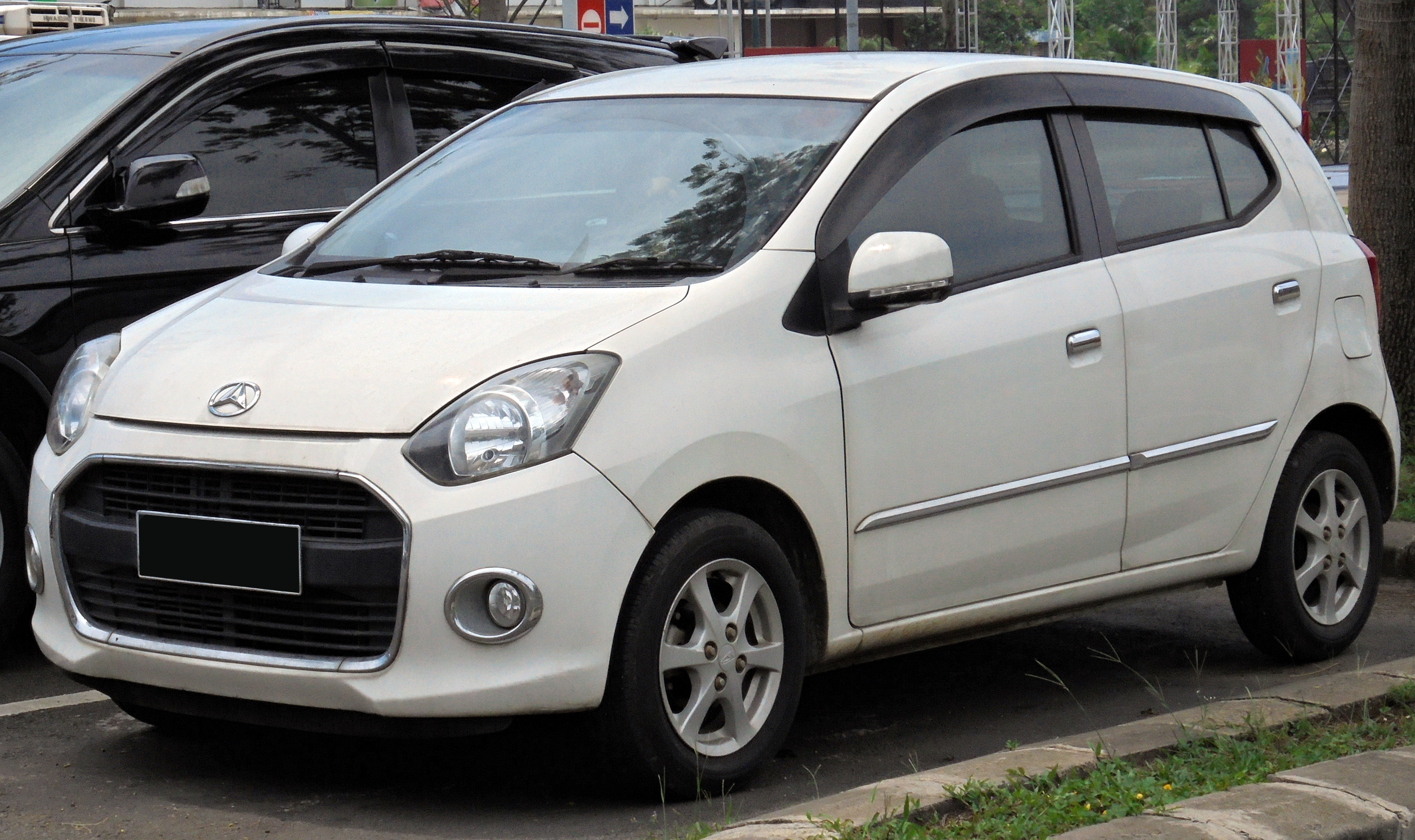
- 2014 Ayla 1.0 X (B100RS; pre-facelift, Indonesia)

Overview
- Model code: B100
- Also called: Toyota Agya; Toyota Wigo; Perodua Axia (Malaysia & Singapore)
- Production: September 2013 – 2023
- Designer: Mark Widjaja, Nobuhiko Ono and Jirou Matsueda

Body and chassis
- Platform: Daihatsu Global A-Segment Platform
- Related: Perodua Bezza; Daihatsu Sigra

Powertrain
- Engine: Petrol: 998 cc 1KR-DE I3 (B100); 998 cc 1KR-VE VVT-i I3 (B100; Agya/Wigo only); 1197 cc 3NR-VE I4 (B101)
- Power output: 48 kW (64 hp; 65 PS) (1KR-DE); 50 kW (67 hp; 68 PS) (1KR-VE); 65 kW (87 hp; 88 PS) (3NR-VE)
- Transmission: 5-speed manual; 4-speed automatic

Dimensions
- Wheelbase: 2,450–2,455 mm (96.5–96.7 in)
- Length: 3,600–3,700 mm (141.7–145.7 in)
- Width: 1,600–1,620 mm (63.0–63.8 in)
- Height: 1,520 mm (59.8 in)
- Kerb weight: 730–880 kg (1,609–1,940 lb)

Chronology
- Predecessor: Toyota Aygo (Agya, South Africa)
- Successor: Toyota Vitz (Agya, South Africa)

The first-generation Ayla and Agya was first announced and displayed at the 20th Indonesia International Motor Show in September 2012 as Daihatsu and Toyota's joint response to the Indonesian government's plan for the Low Cost Green Car (LCGC) program which eliminates luxury goods tax for eligible vehicles. The ratification of the LCGC program by the government was delayed by a year, which also delayed the mass production and market launch in September 2013. Early models were solely powered by a 998 cc 1KR-DE three-cylinder engine.

In 2014, Toyota Motor Philippines (TMP) introduced the car as the Toyota Wigo.

=== 2017 facelift ===
The first-generation Ayla and the Indonesian market Agya received their first facelift on 7 April 2017, with its development led by chief engineer Nobuhiko Ono. This facelift includes redesigned front and rear fascias (also with extended bonnet for 1.2-litre Ayla and all Agya variants), improved interior quality, among other improvements. The 1.0-litre Ayla variants retained the same headlights design from the previous version. The facelift also includes additional engine options: the 998 cc 1KR-VE three-cylinder engine with VVT-i (Agya only) and the 1.2-litre 3NR-VE four-cylinder engine with Dual VVT-i. The 1.0-litre Ayla variants kept the previous 1KR-DE engine.

The first facelift Wigo was launched on 10 May 2017.

=== 2020 facelift ===
The first-generation Ayla (1.2-litre variants) and the Indonesian market Agya received their second facelift on 19 March 2020. This facelift includes an updated front bumper design, redesigned side mirrors, digital air conditioner controls, among other improvements. The 1.0-litre Ayla variants retained the same design from the previous version. On 9 August 2021, the TRD S trim of the Indonesian market Agya was renamed to GR Sport. The 1.0-litre Agya variants were also removed as well in November 2021.

The second facelift Wigo was launched on 15 June 2020 in the Philippines.

=== Specifications ===
==== Ayla ====
The Ayla is only available in Indonesia, in eleven trim levels:

- 1.0 D (only with 5-speed manual transmission, no power steering, 2012–2023)
- 1.0 D+ (only with 5-speed manual transmission, 2012–2023)
- 1.0 M (with 5-speed manual and 4-speed automatic transmission, 2012–2020)
- 1.0 M Sporty (with aero kit, 2013–2017)
- 1.0 X (with 5-speed manual and 4-speed automatic transmission, 2012–2023)
- 1.0 X Elegant (with aero kit, 2013–2017)
- 1.0 X Deluxe (with aero kit, 2017–2023)
- 1.0 X Airbag (with dual airbags, 2017–2020)
- 1.2 X (with 5-speed manual and 4-speed automatic transmission, 2017–2023)
- 1.2 R (with 5-speed manual and 4-speed automatic transmission, 2017–2023)
- 1.2 R Deluxe (with aero kit, 2017–2023)

Pre-facelift

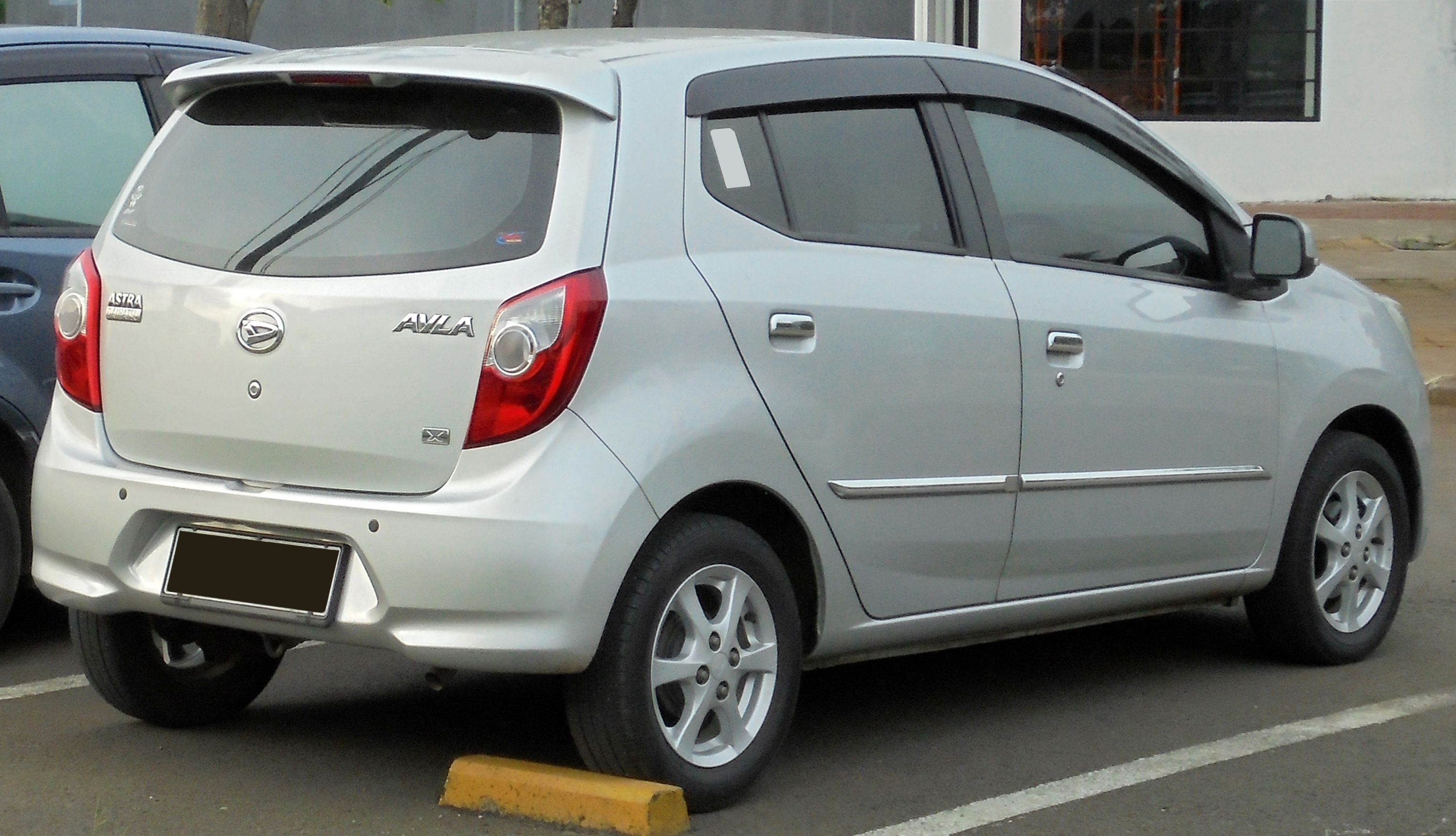
2014 Ayla 1.0 X (B100RS, Indonesia)

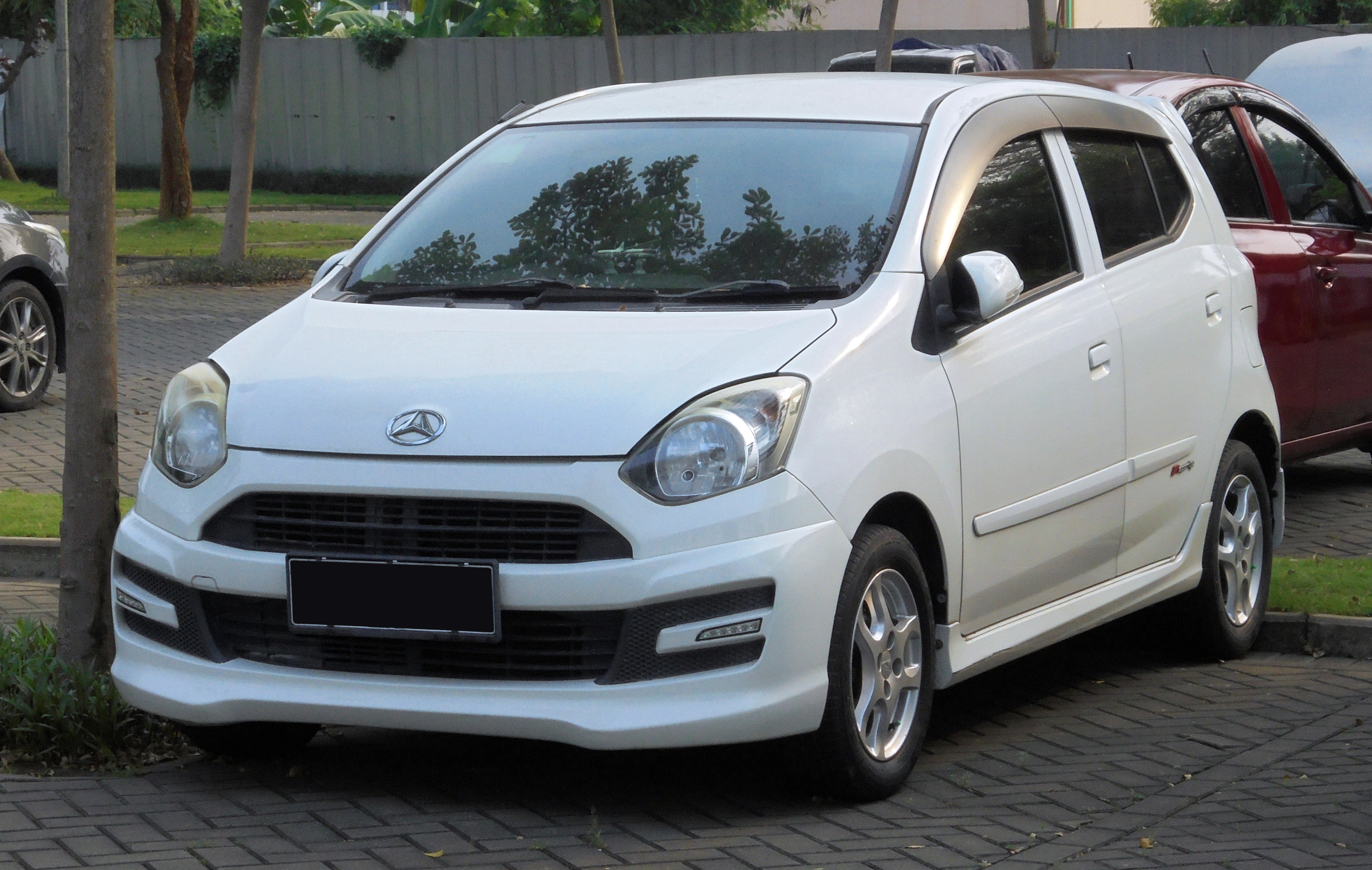
2015 Ayla 1.0 M Sporty (B100RS, Indonesia)

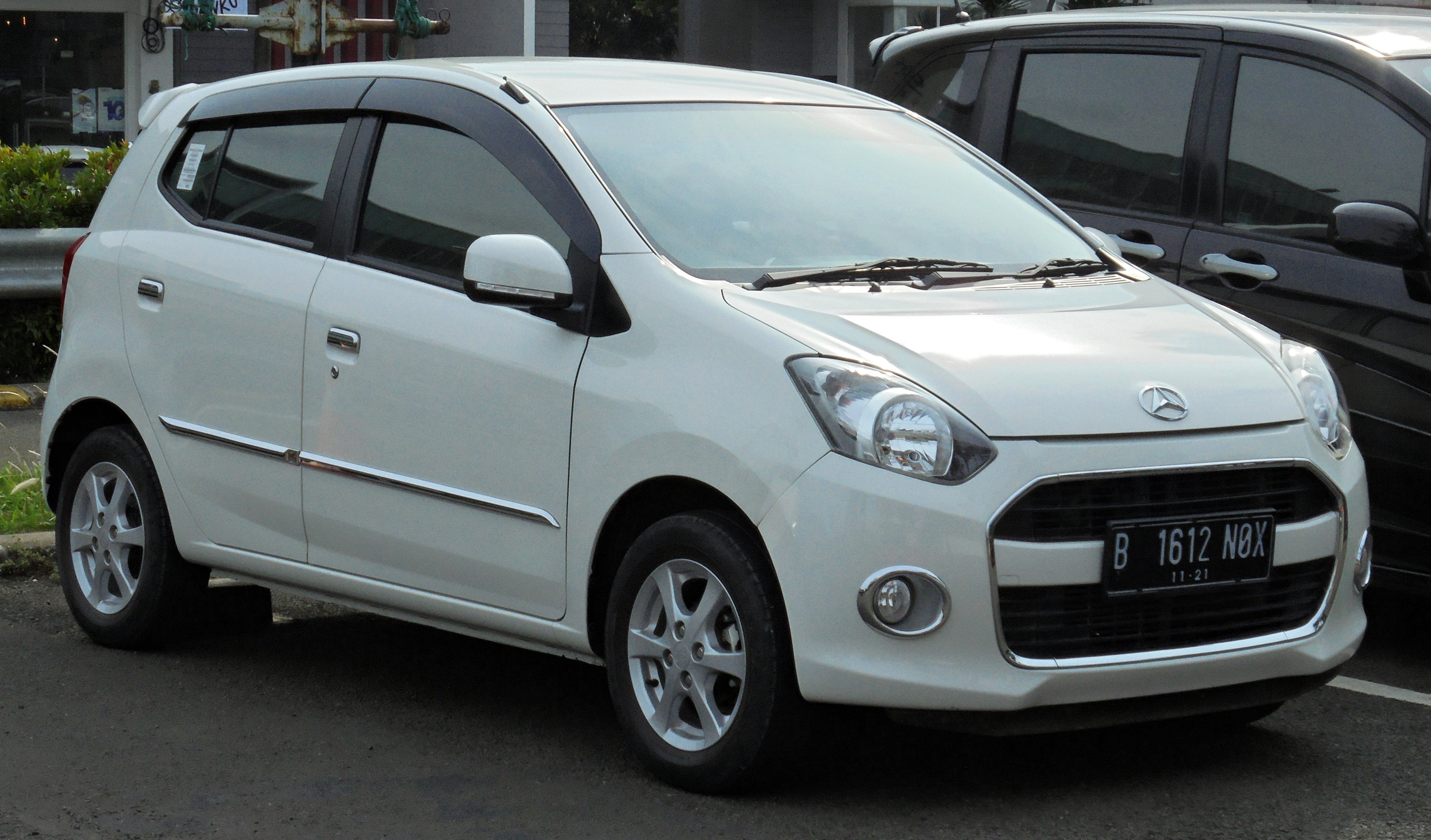
2016 Ayla 1.0 X (B100RS, Indonesia)

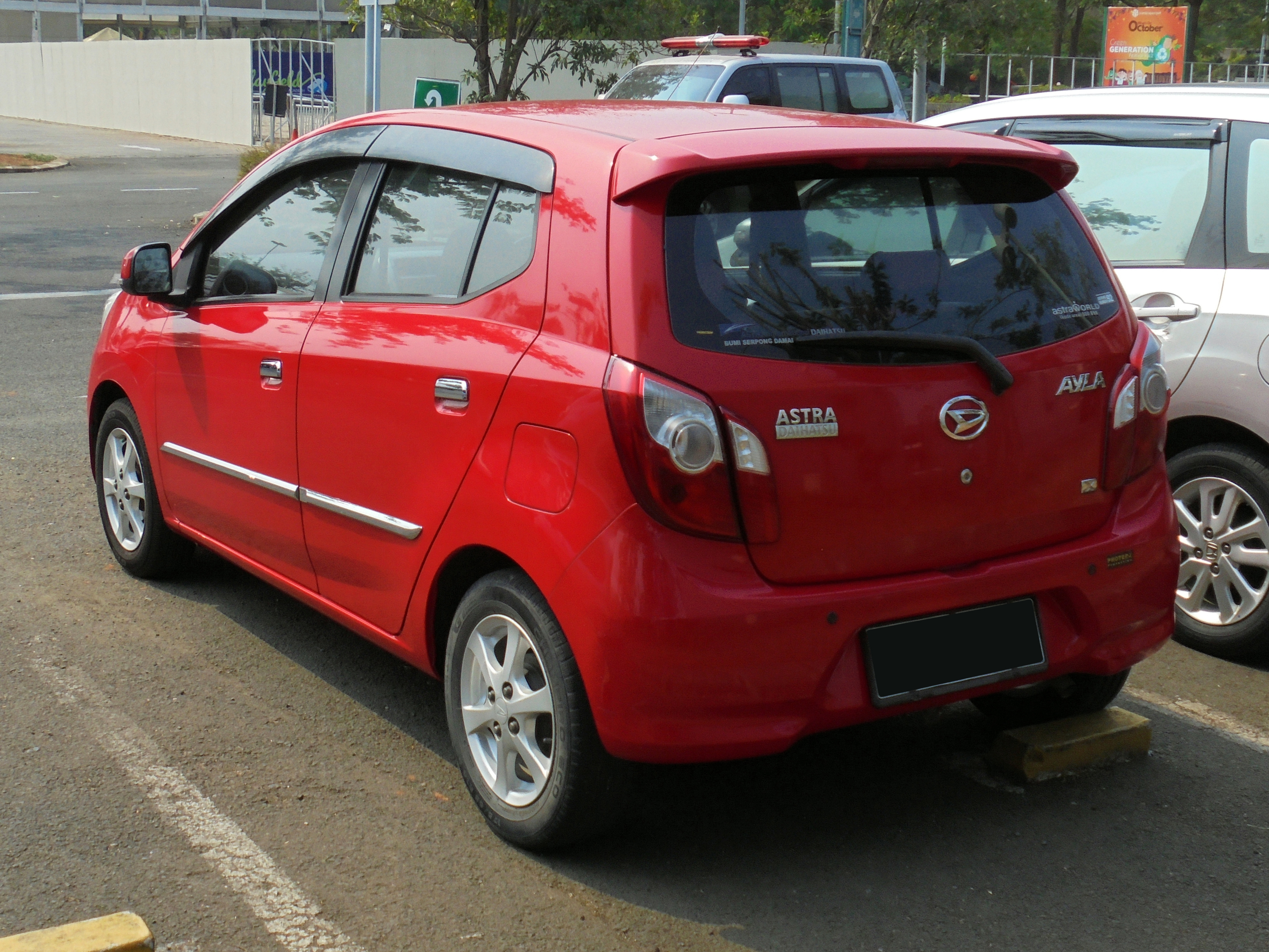
2015 Ayla 1.0 X (B100RS, Indonesia)

First facelift

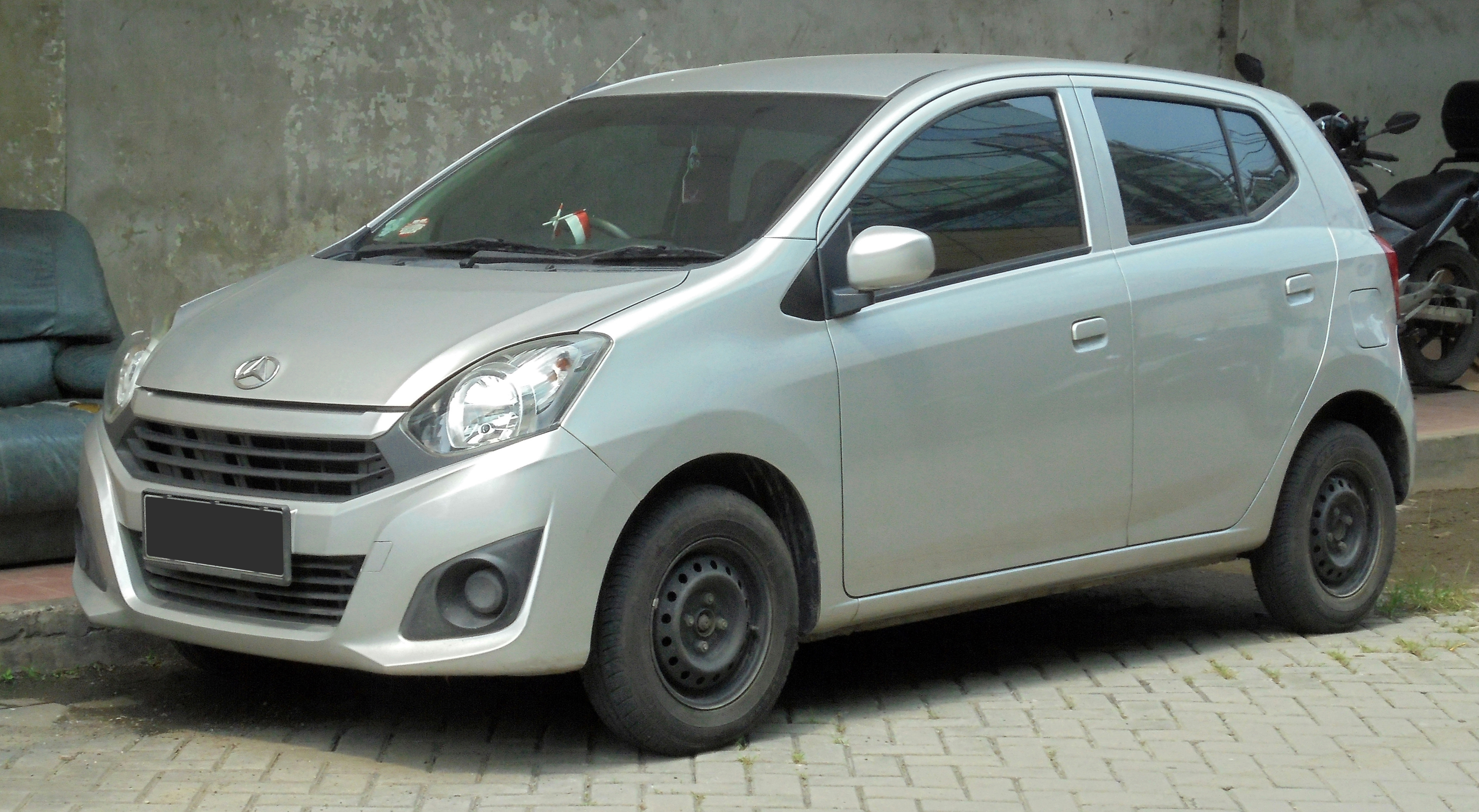
2017 Ayla 1.0 M (B100RS, Indonesia)

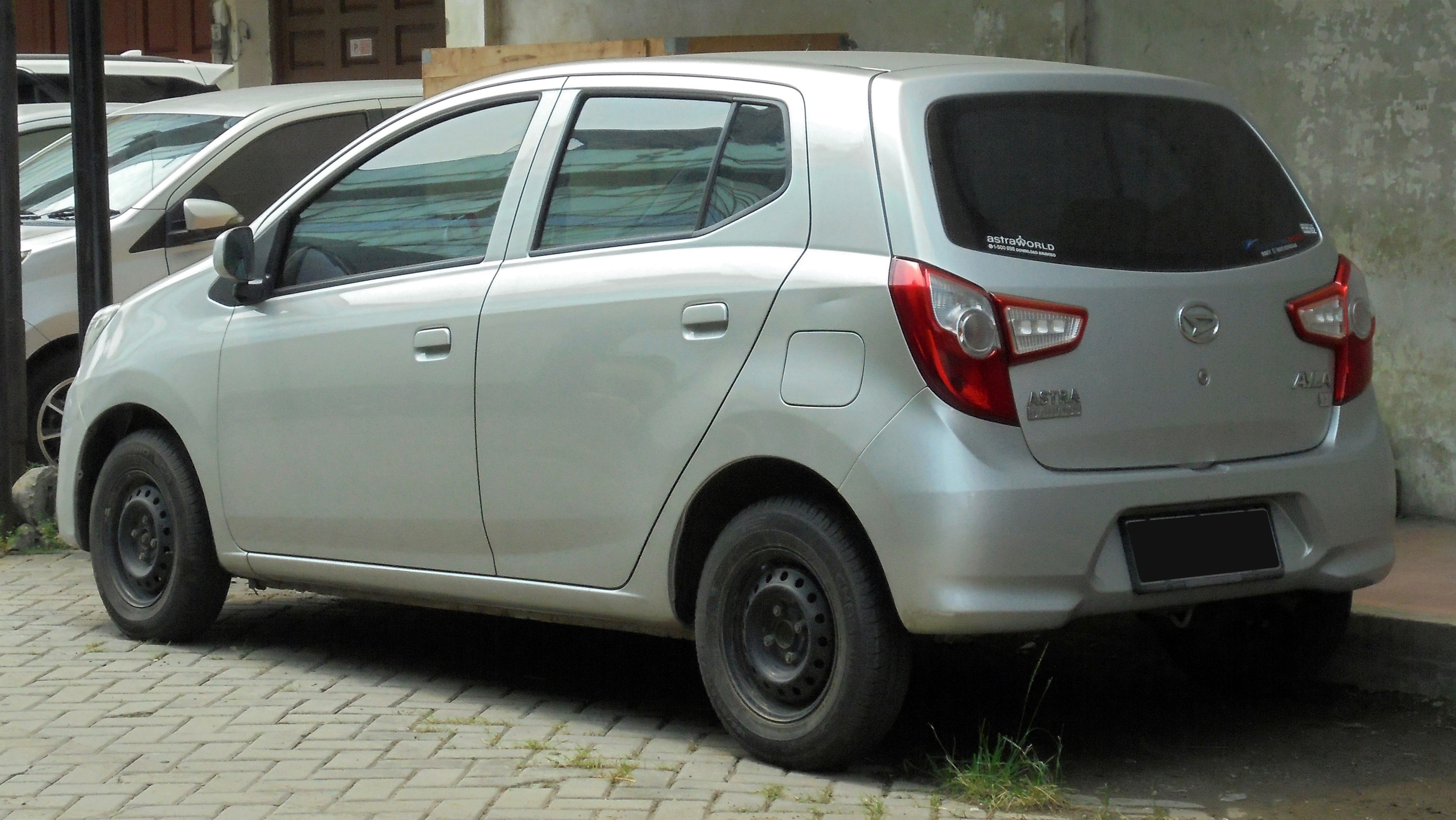
2017 Ayla 1.0 M (B100RS, Indonesia)

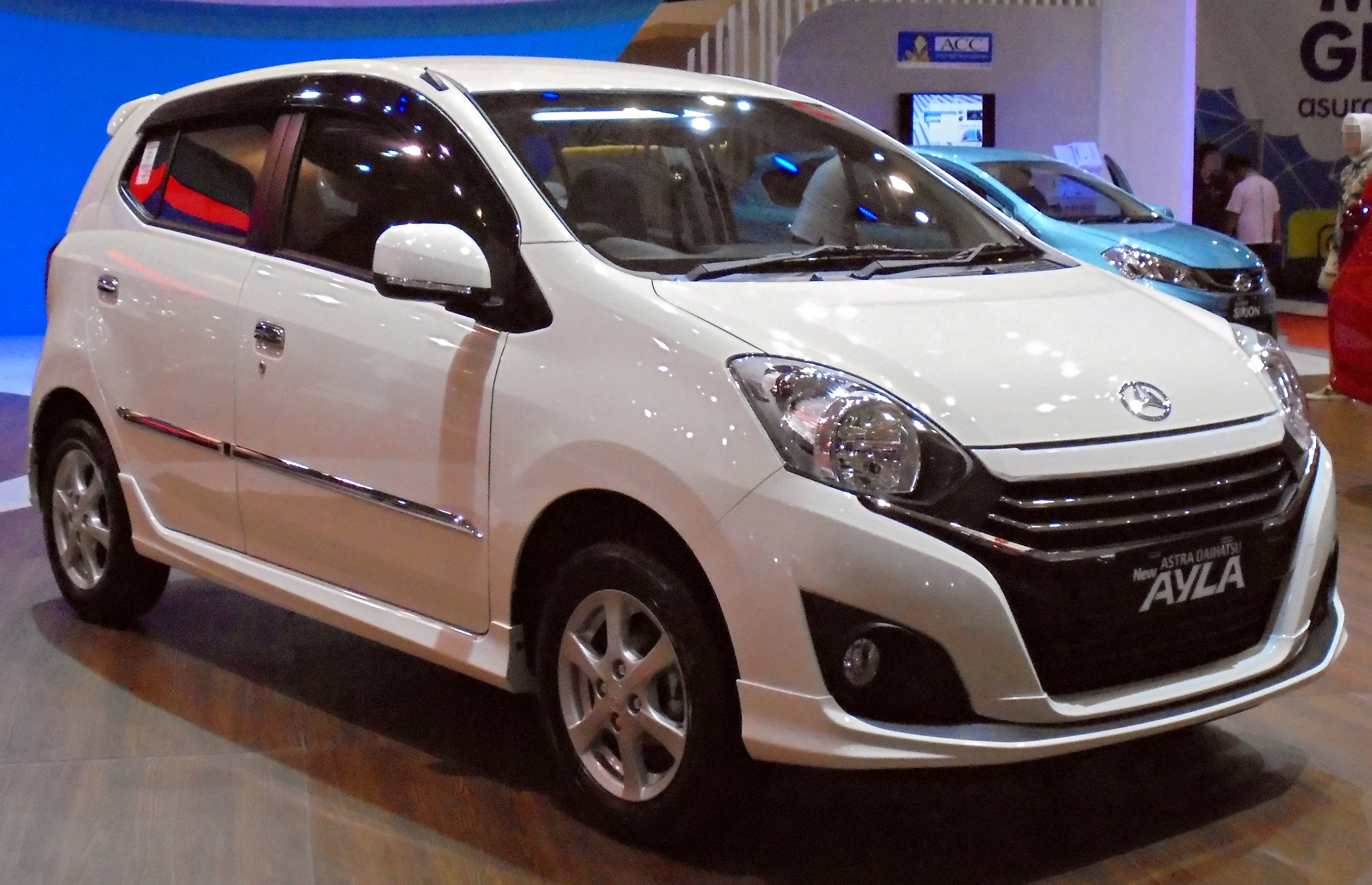
2019 Ayla 1.0 X Deluxe (B100RS, Indonesia)

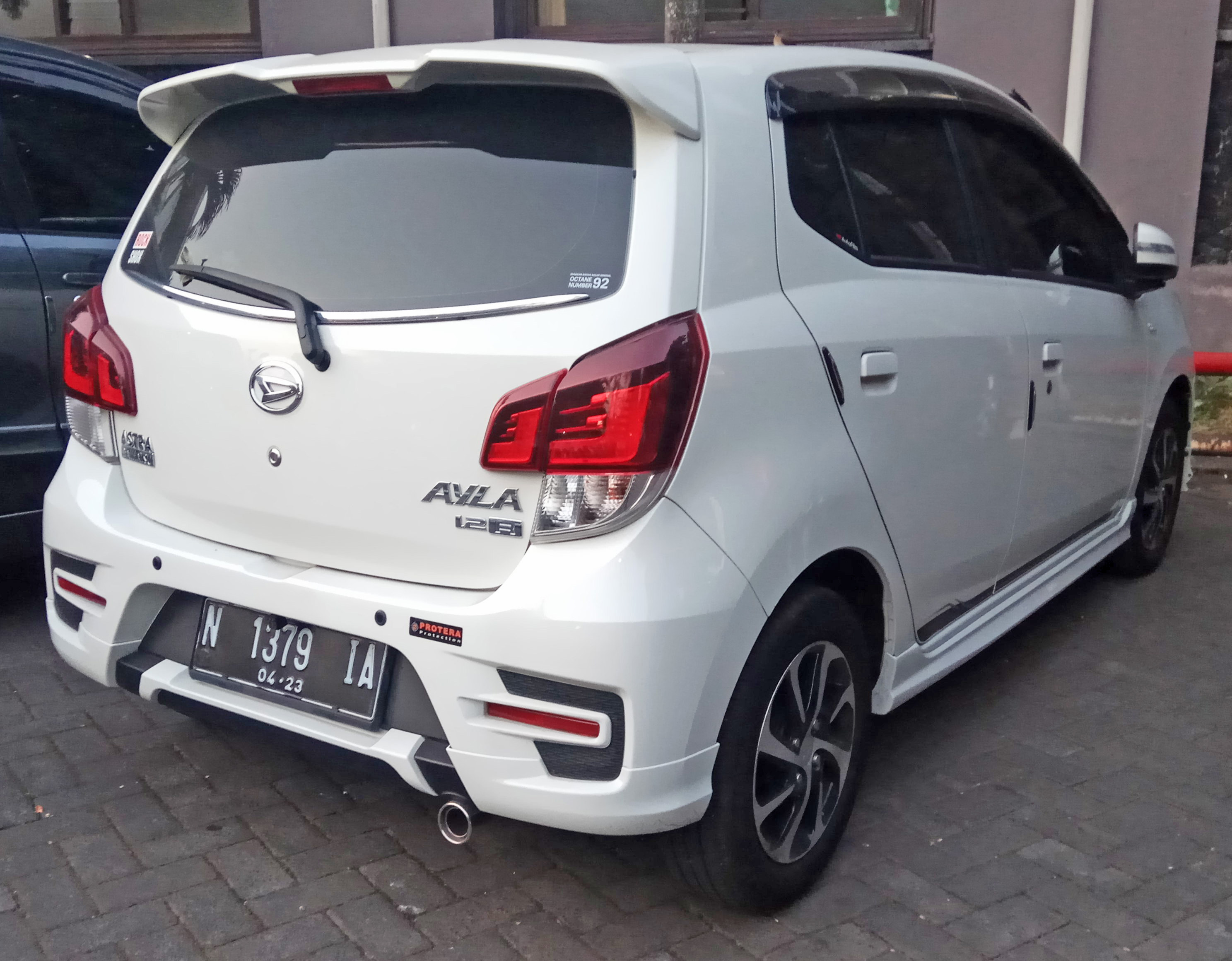
2018 Ayla 1.2 R Deluxe (B101RS, Indonesia)

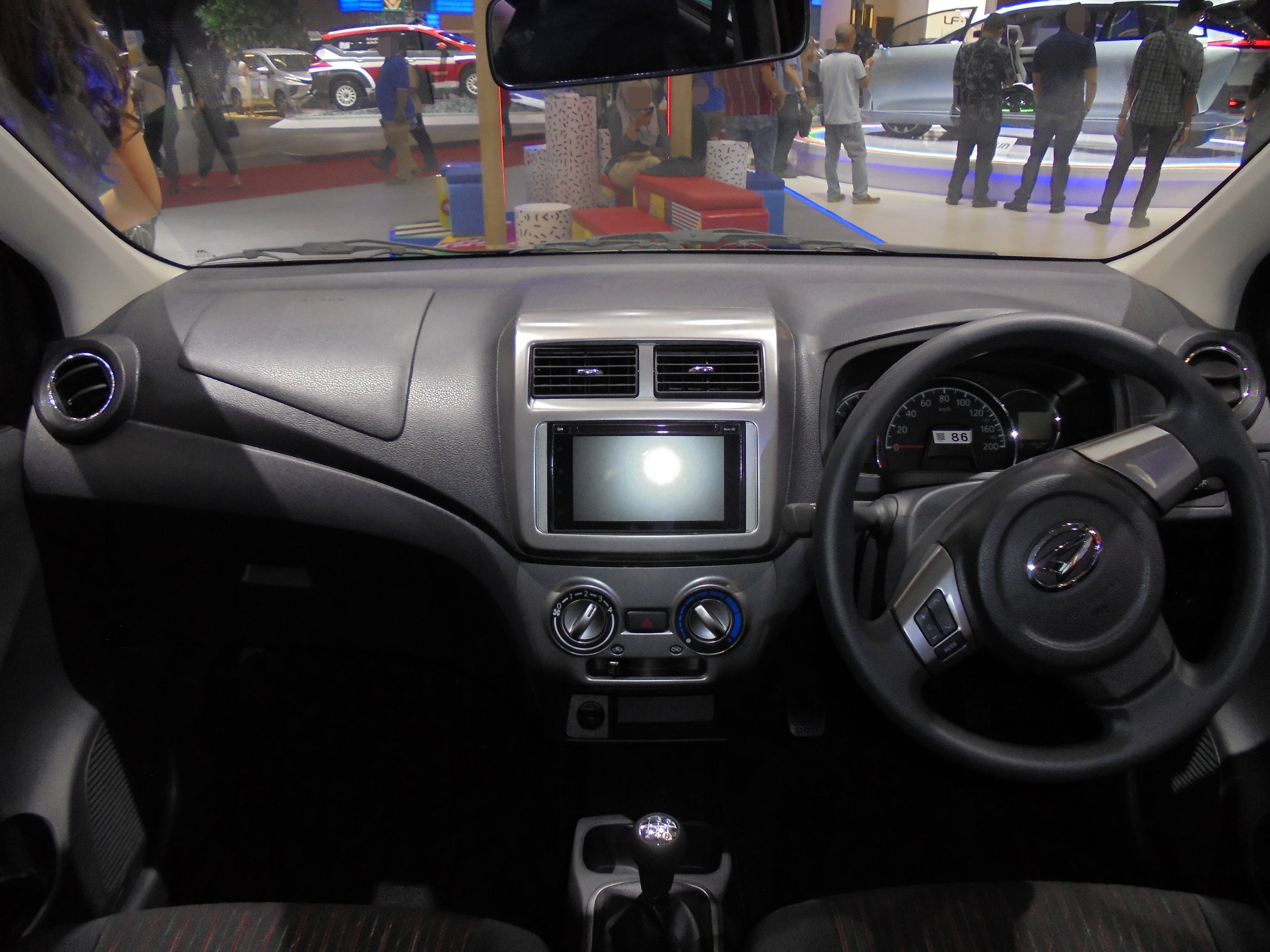
2019 Ayla 1.2 R Deluxe interior (Indonesia)

Second facelift

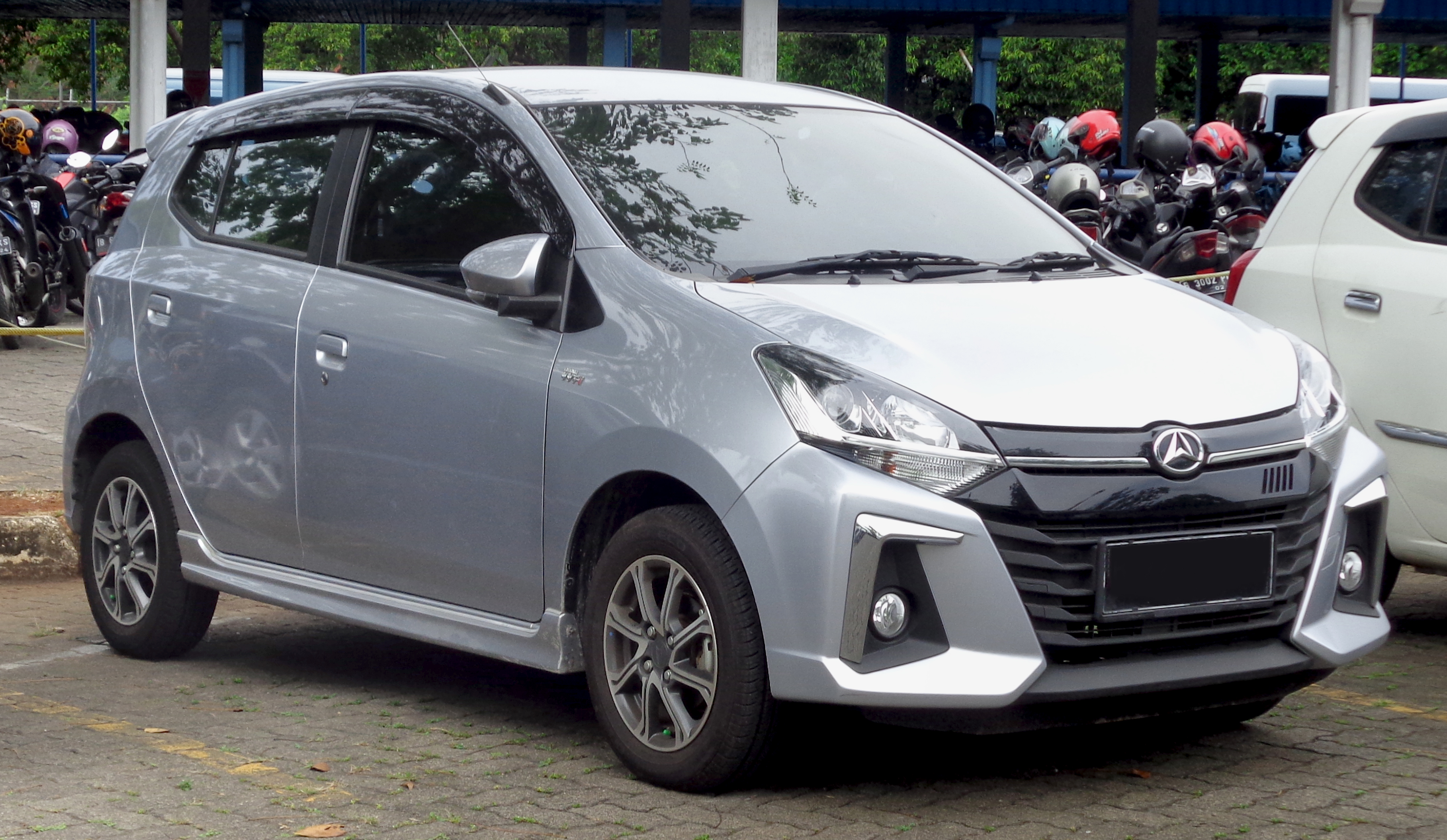
2021 Ayla 1.2 R (B101RS, Indonesia)

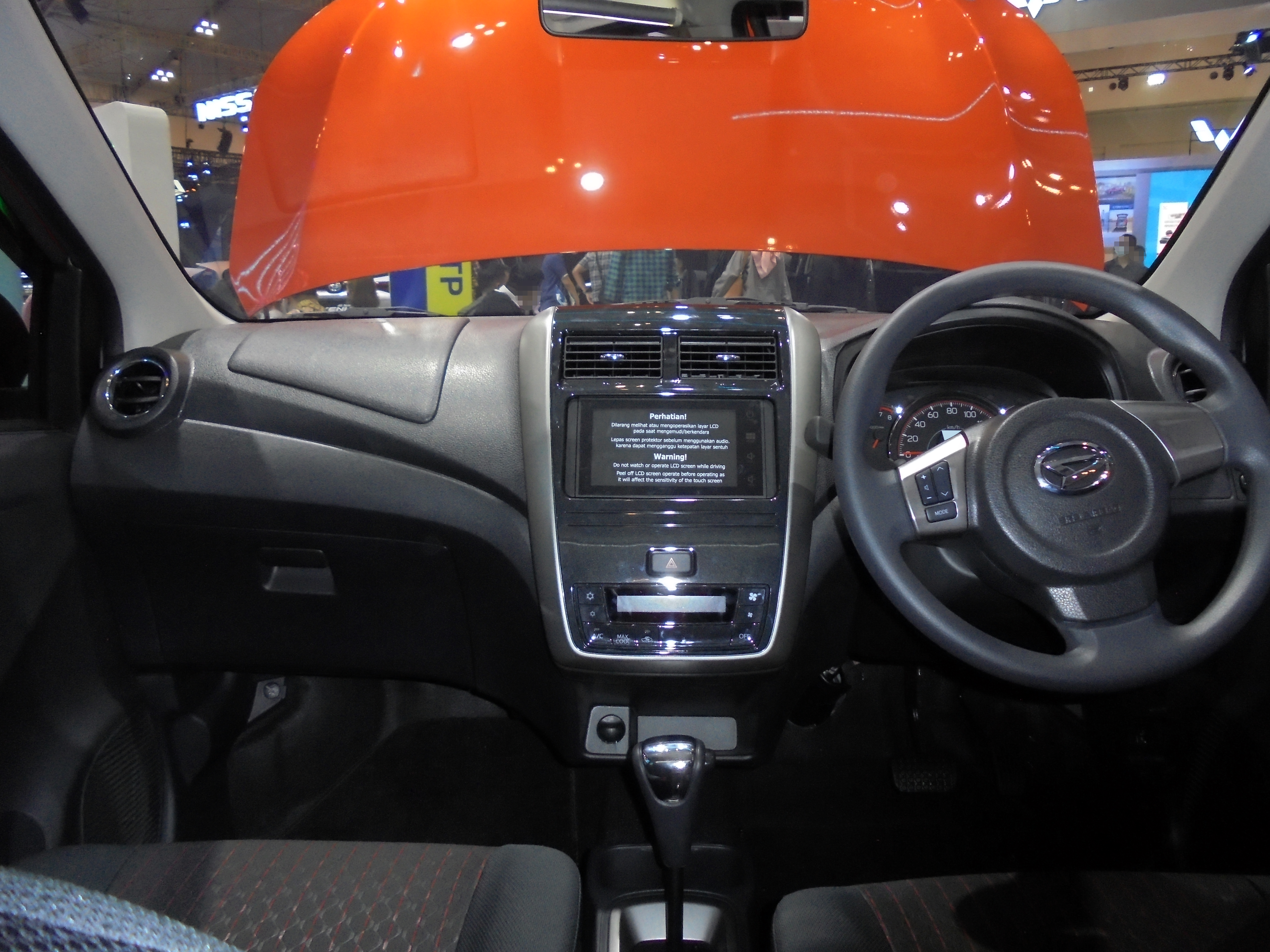
2021 Ayla 1.2 R Deluxe interior (Indonesia)

==== Toyota Agya ====
In Indonesia, the Agya was initially available in three trim levels: E, G and TRD S. Below are the complete breakdown of all trim levels:

- 1.0 E (only with 5-speed manual transmission, 2012–2020)
- 1.0 G (with 5-speed manual and 4-speed automatic transmission, 2012–2021)
- 1.0 TRD S (with 5-speed manual and 4-speed automatic transmission, 2012–2017)
- 1.2 G (with 5-speed manual and 4-speed automatic transmission, 2017–2023)
- 1.2 TRD S (with 5-speed manual and 4-speed automatic transmission, 2017–2021)
- 1.2 GR Sport (with 5-speed manual and 4-speed automatic transmission, 2021–2023)

Pre-facelift

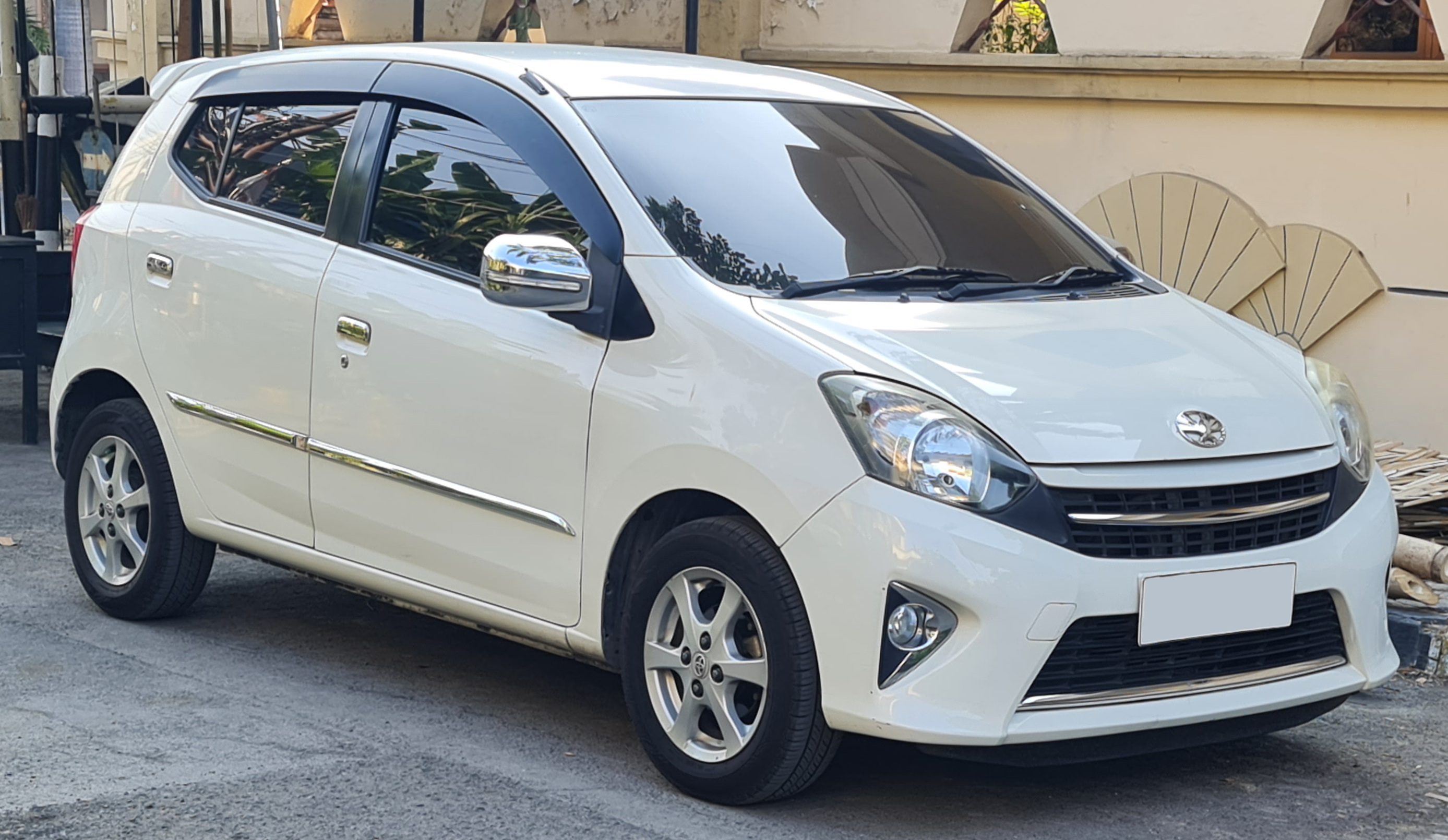
2013 Toyota Agya 1.0 G (B100RA, Indonesia)

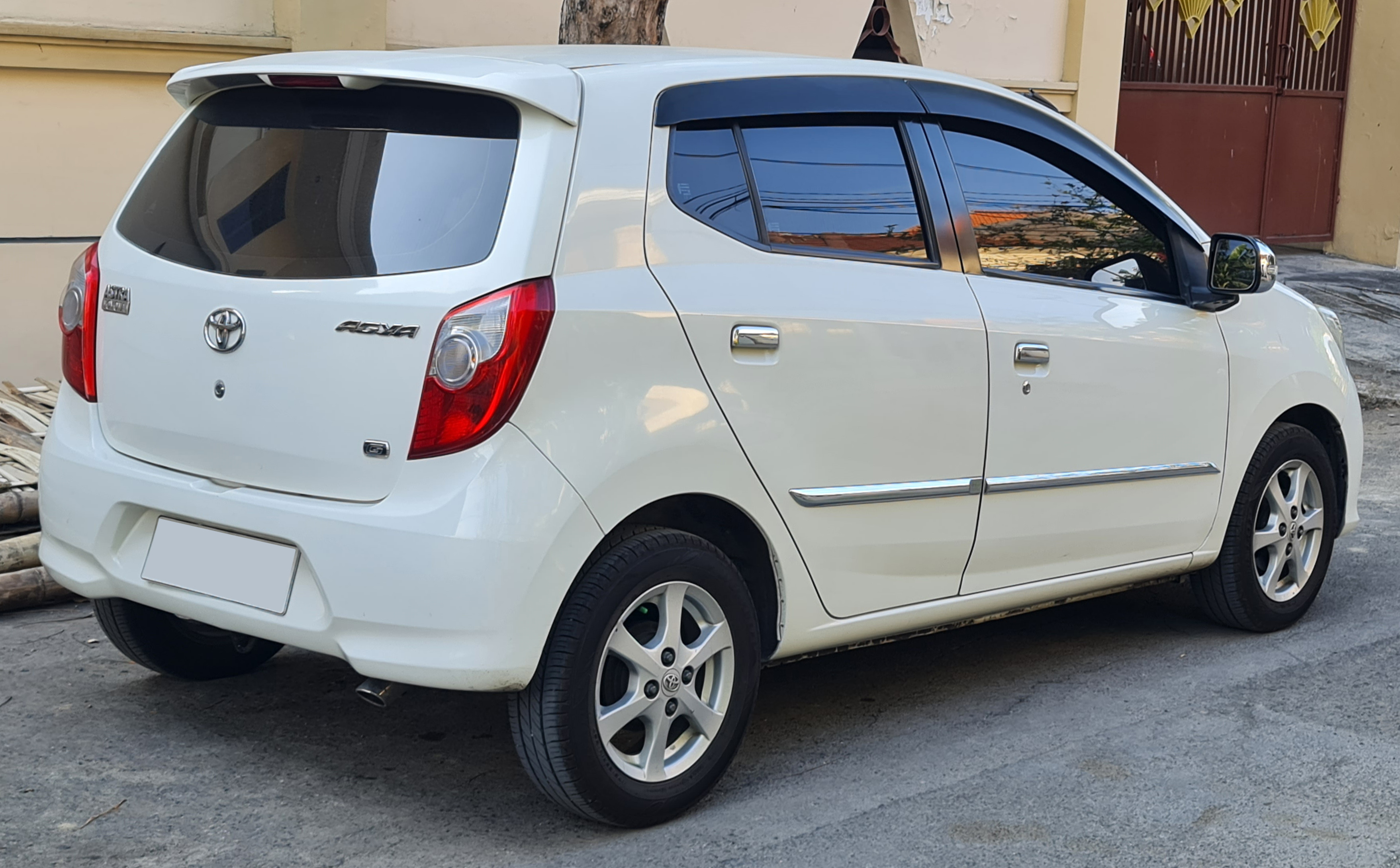
2013 Agya 1.0 G (B100RA, Indonesia)

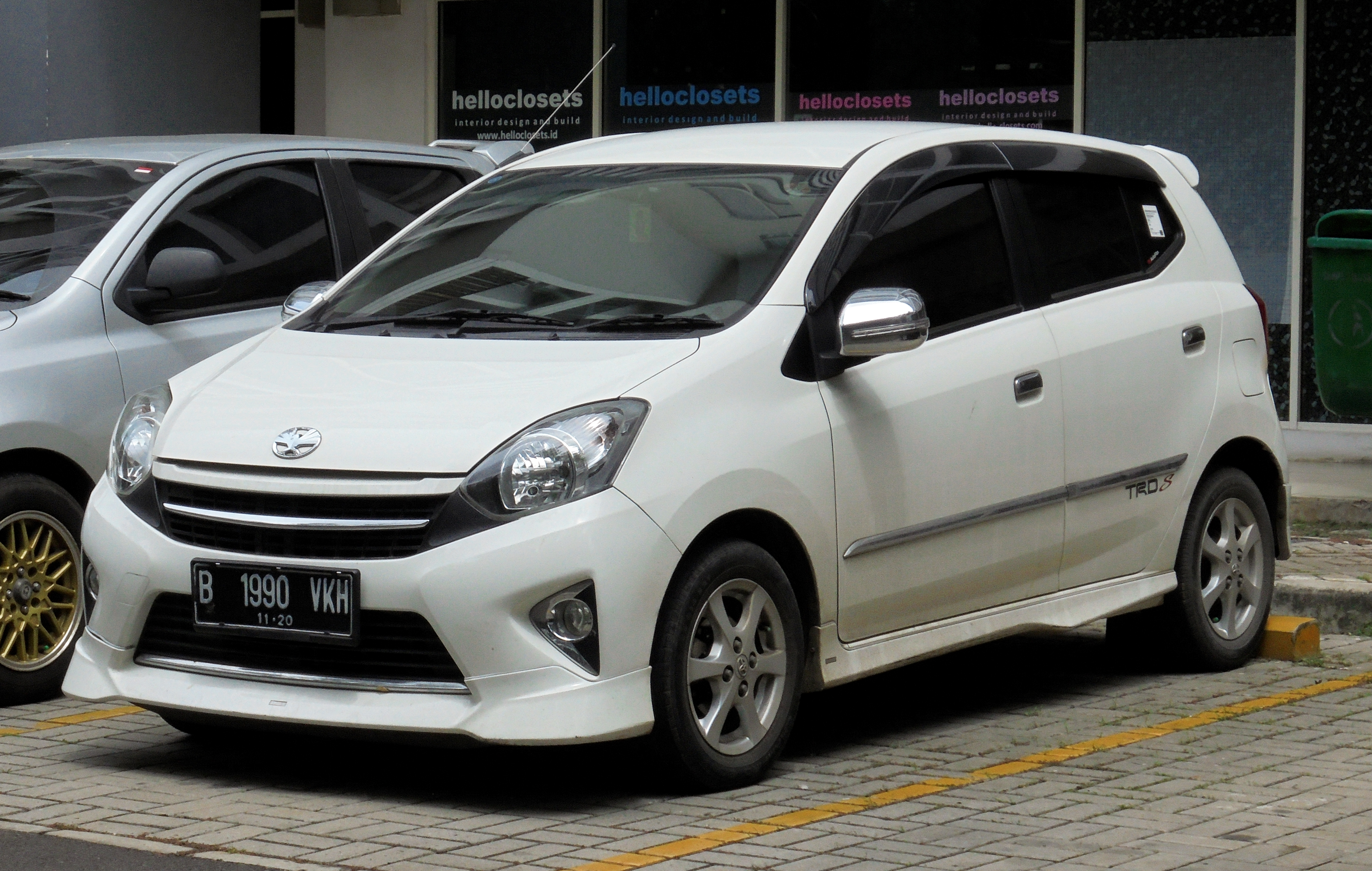
2015 Agya 1.0 TRD S (B100RA, Indonesia)

First facelift

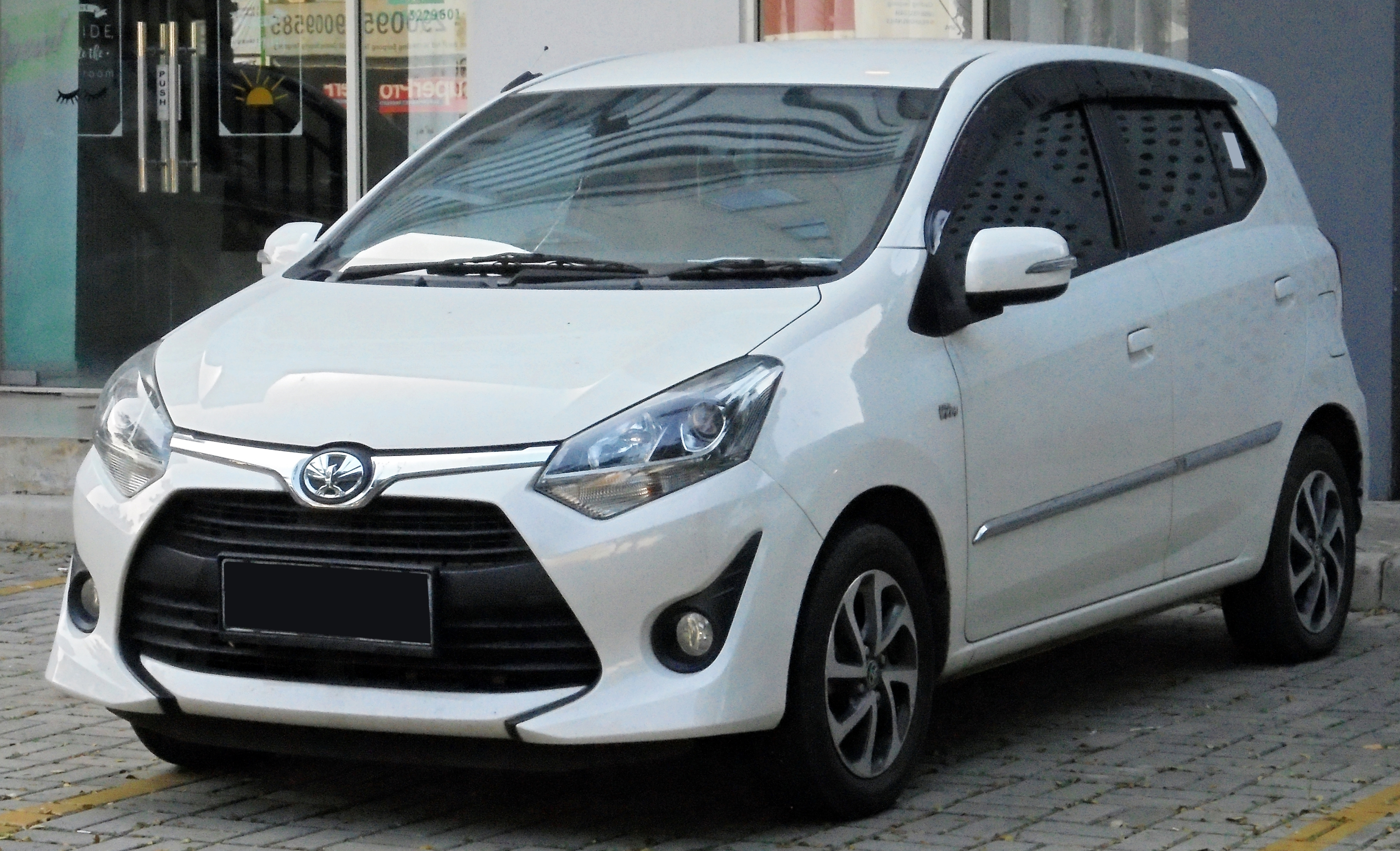
2017 Agya 1.2 G (B101RA, Indonesia)

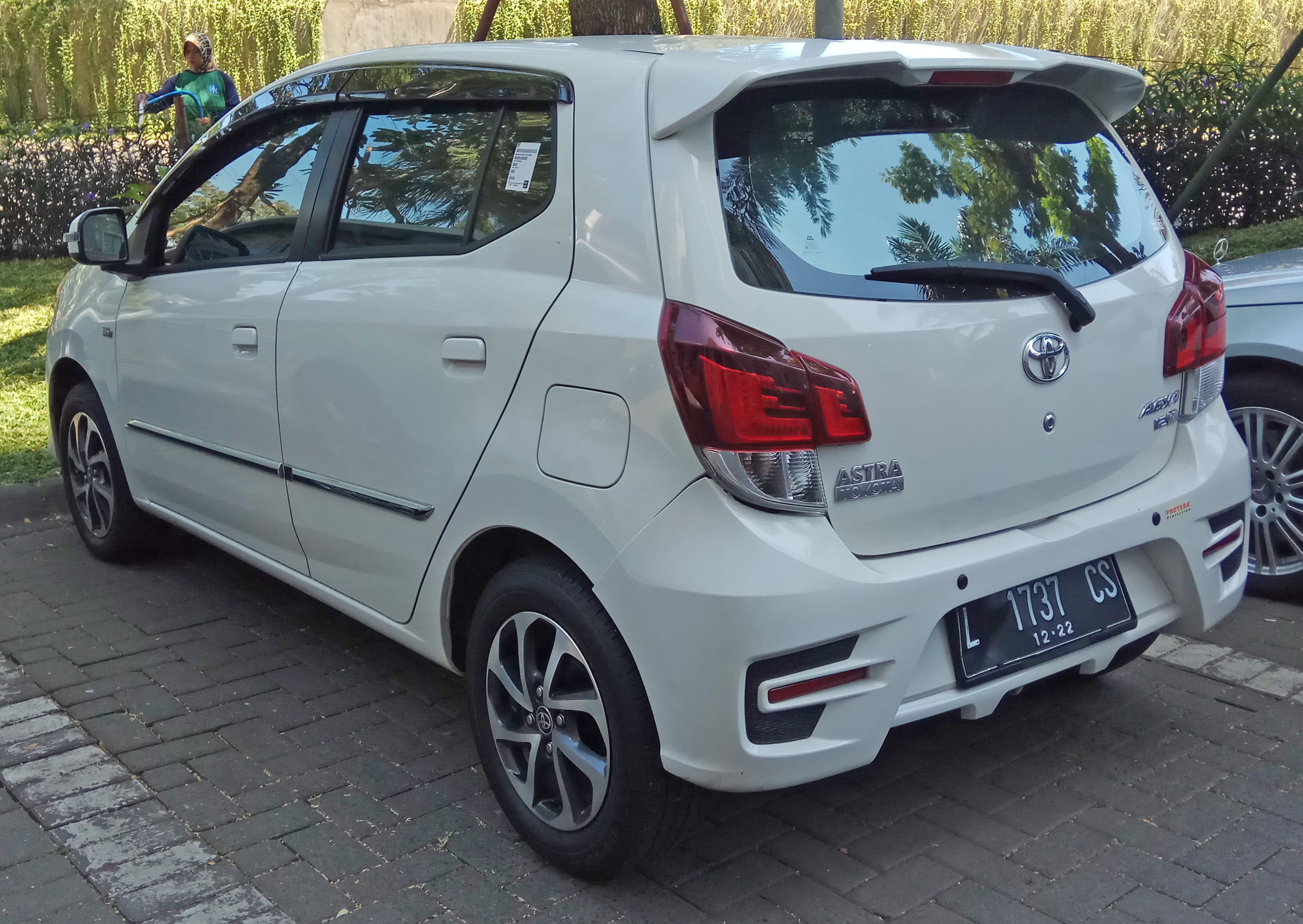
2017 Agya 1.2 G (B101RA, Indonesia)

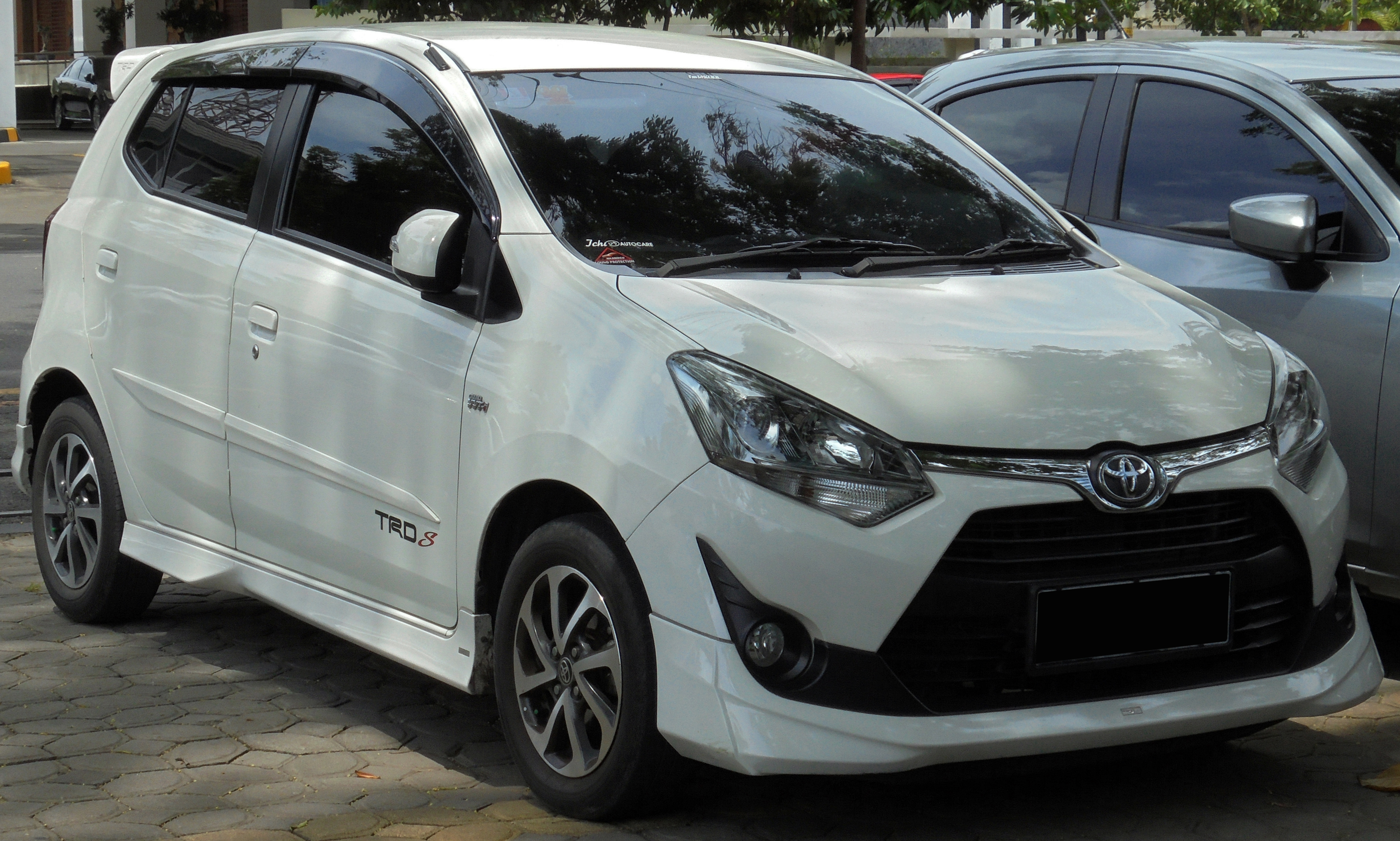
2017 Agya 1.2 TRD S (B101RA, Indonesia)

Second facelift

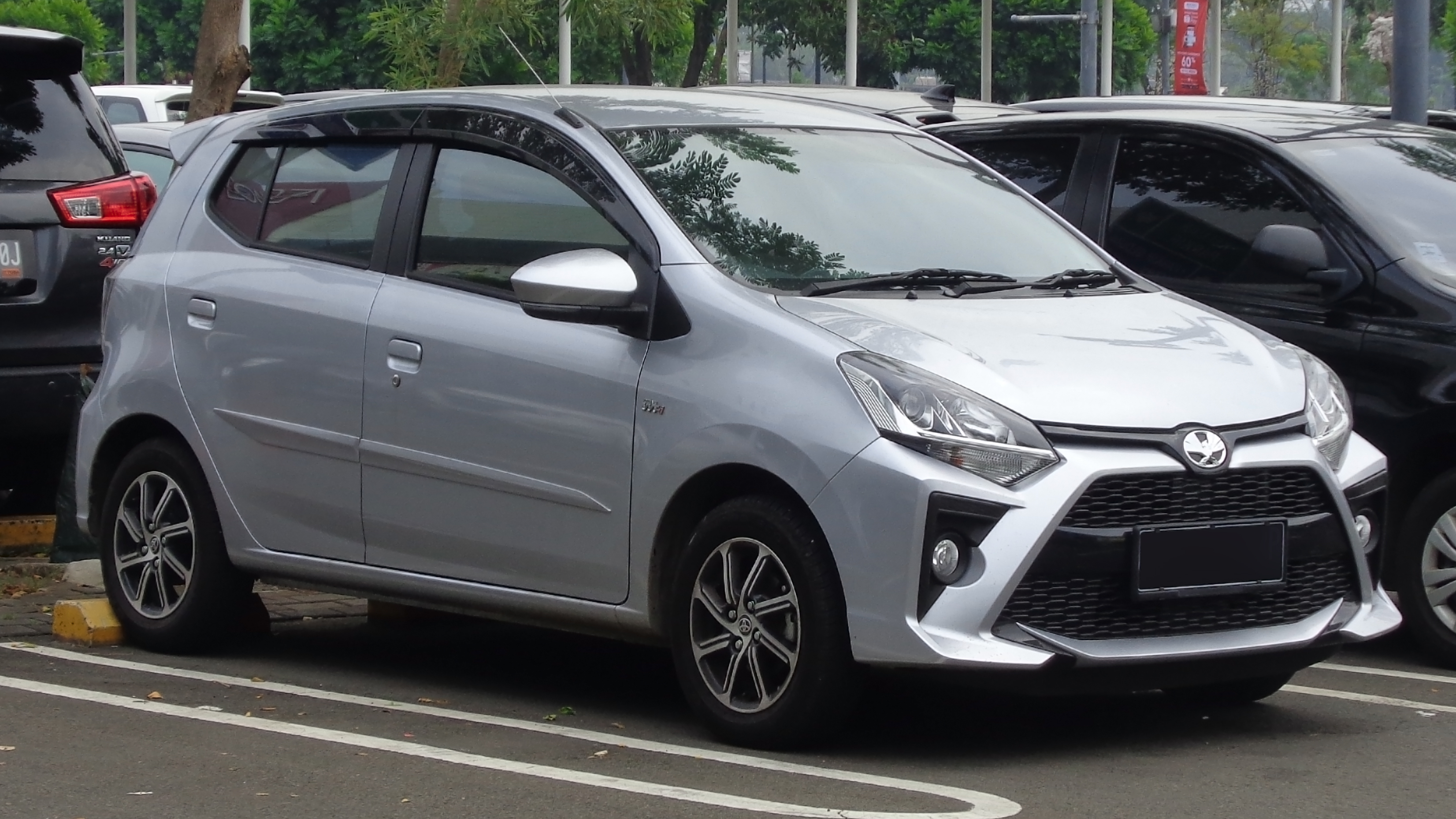
2021 Agya 1.2 G (B101RA, Indonesia)

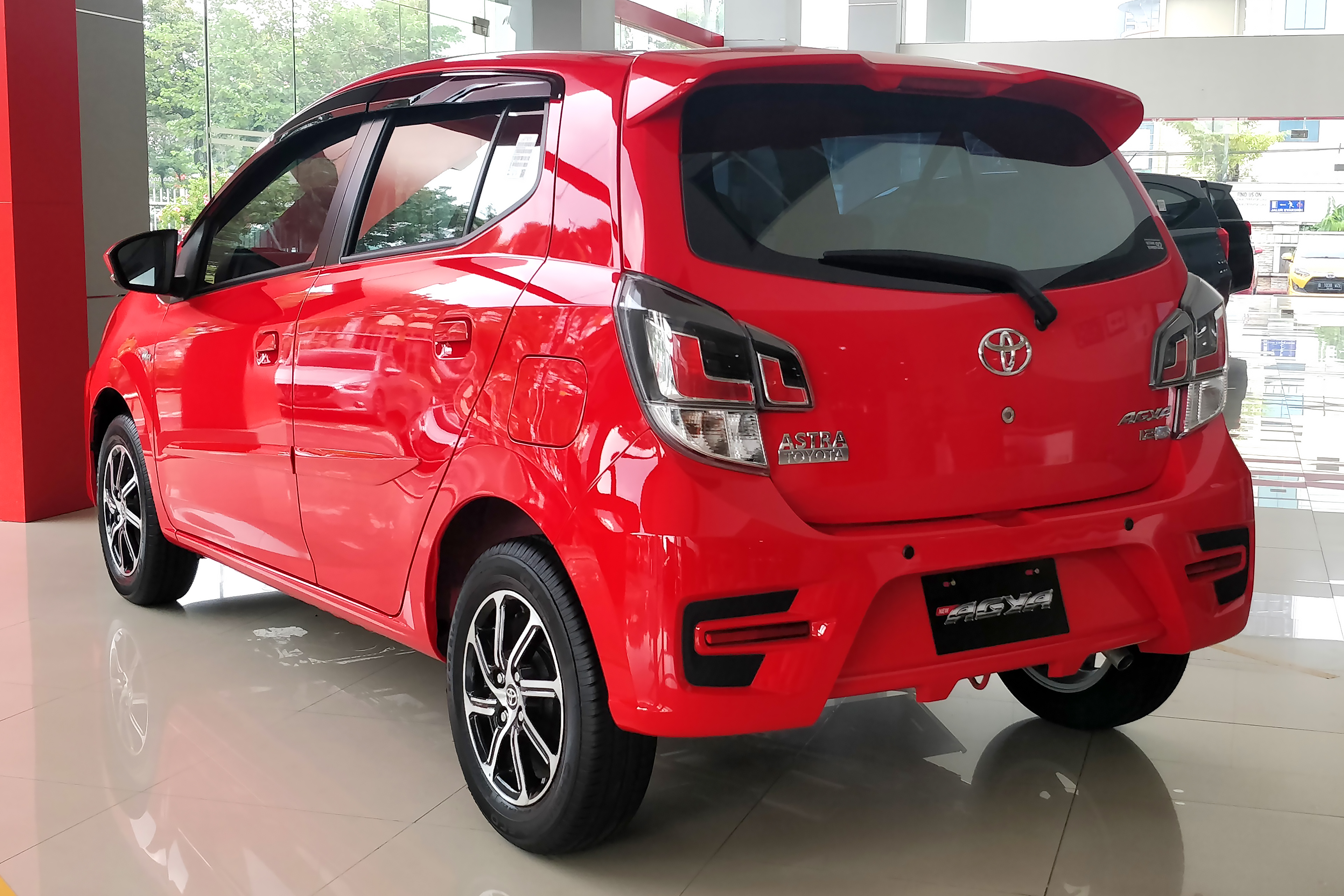
2021 Agya 1.2 G (B101RA, Indonesia)

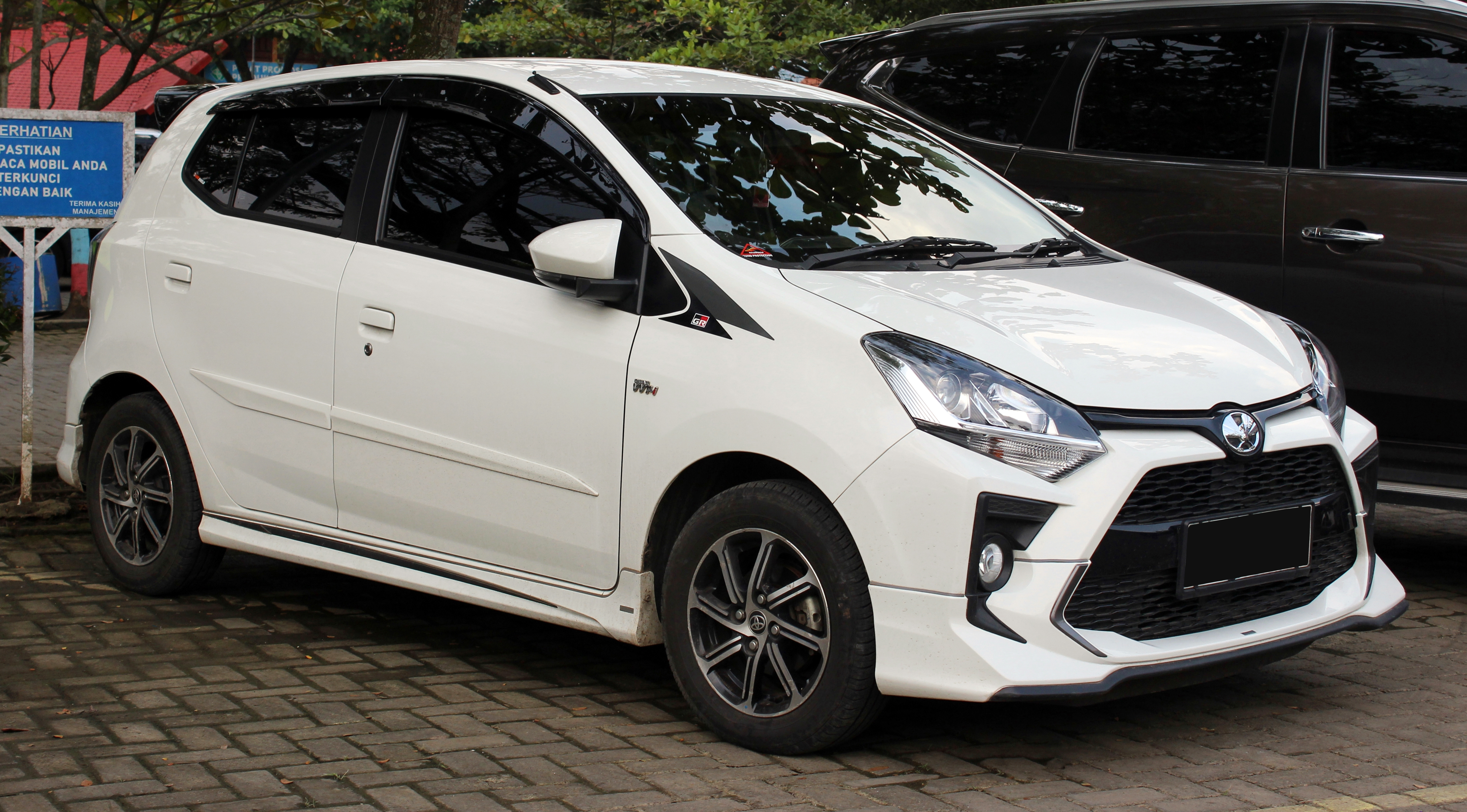
2022 Agya 1.2 GR Sport (B101RA, Indonesia)

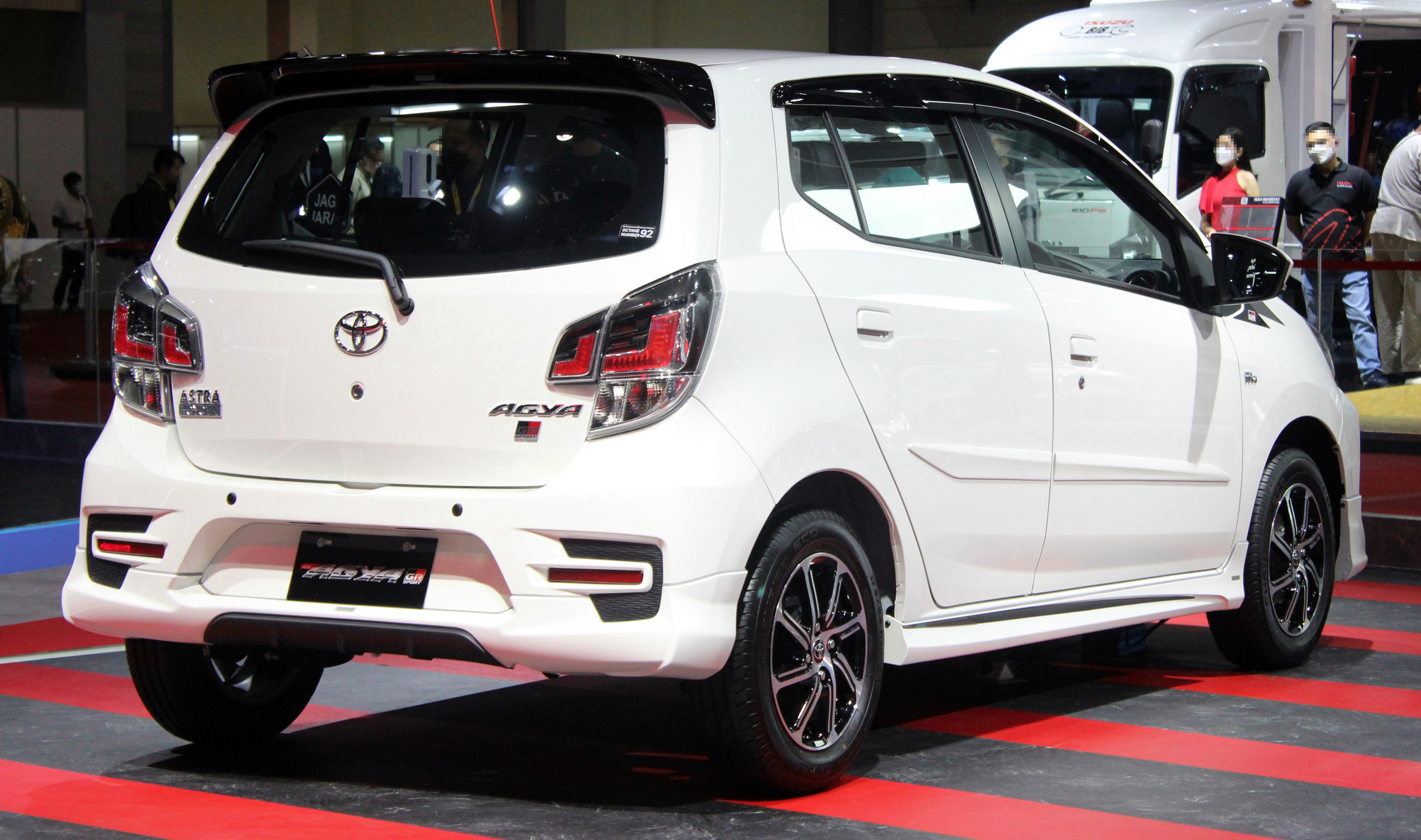
2022 Agya 1.2 GR Sport (B101RA, Indonesia)

==== Toyota Wigo ====
===== Brunei =====
In Brunei, the Wigo is offered in sole 1.0 G trim with automatic transmission. It was launched in July 2015.

===== Philippines =====
In the Philippines, the Wigo comes in three trim levels:

- 1.0 E (only with 5-speed manual transmission)
- 1.0 G (with 5-speed manual and 4-speed automatic transmission)
- 1.0 TRD S (only with 4-speed automatic transmission)

During Wigo's introduction, Toyota Motor Philippines launched an extensive marketing campaign for the car, featuring actors John Lloyd Cruz and Sarah Geronimo.

In the Philippines, the Wigo has been awarded Best Micro Car of the Year by the Car Awards Group for 2014–2015.

===== Sri Lanka =====
In Sri Lanka, the Wigo is offered in 1.0 G and TRD S trim levels with only the automatic transmission available.

===== Vietnam =====
The first facelift Wigo was launched in Vietnam in 2018. It is only offered in 1.2 G variant with 5-speed manual and 4-speed automatic transmission options.

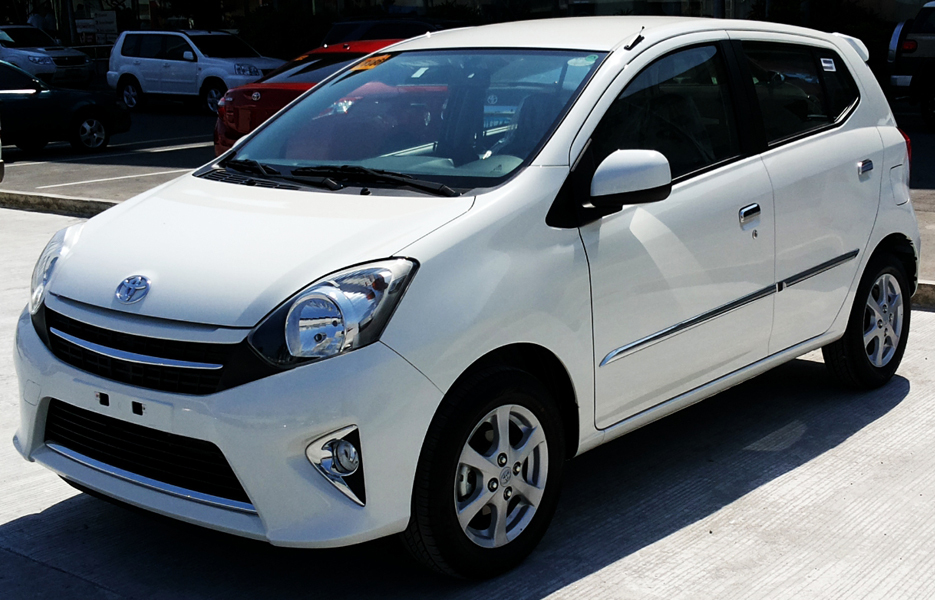
2014 Toyota Wigo 1.0 G (B100LA; pre-facelift, Philippines)

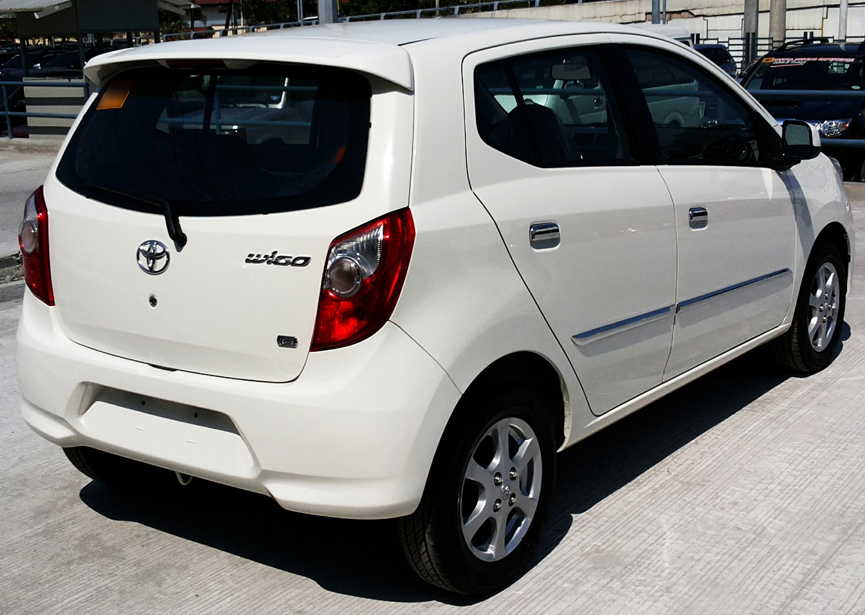
2014 Wigo 1.0 G (B100LA; pre-facelift, Philippines)

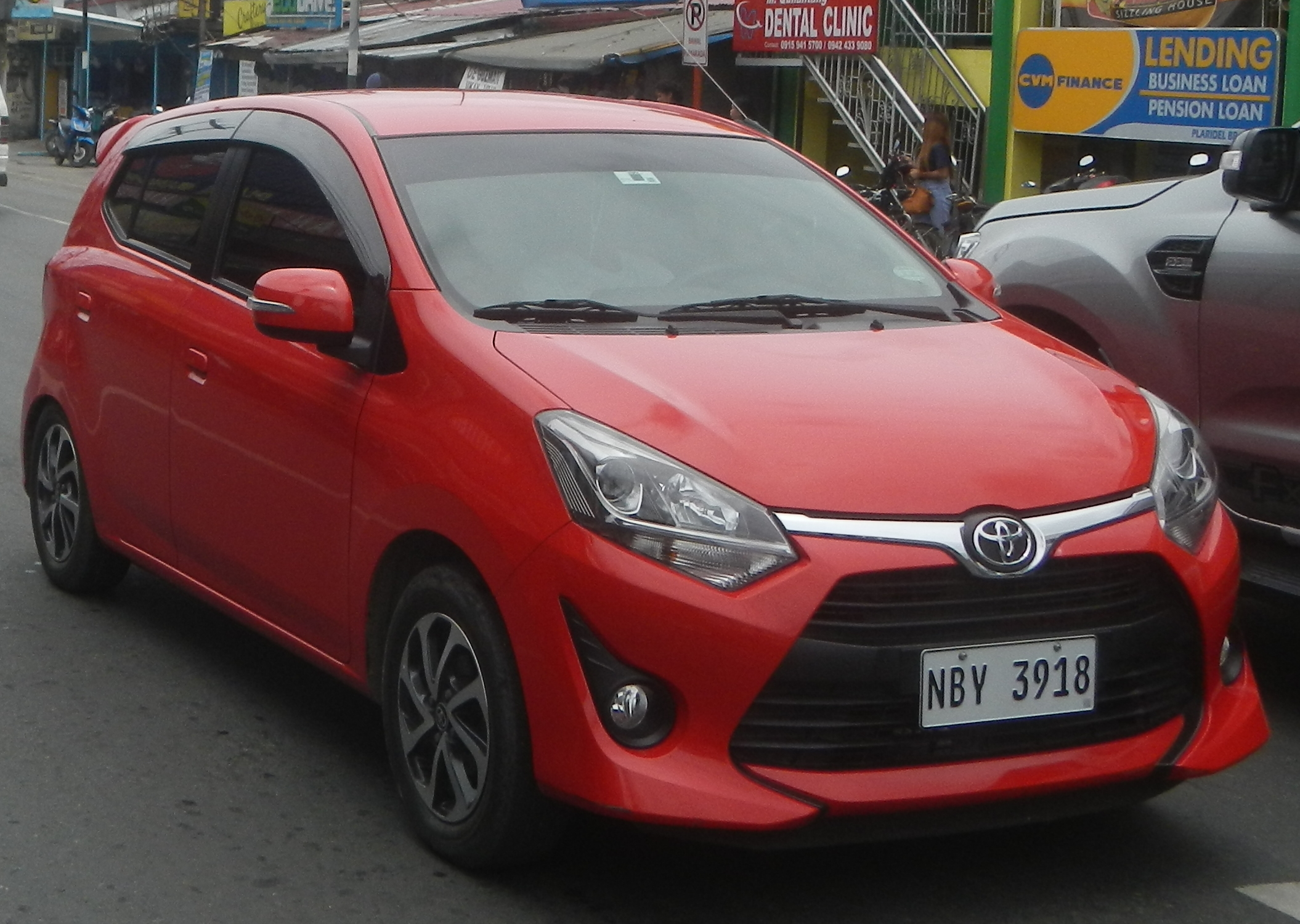
2017 Wigo 1.0 G (B100LA; first facelift, Philippines)

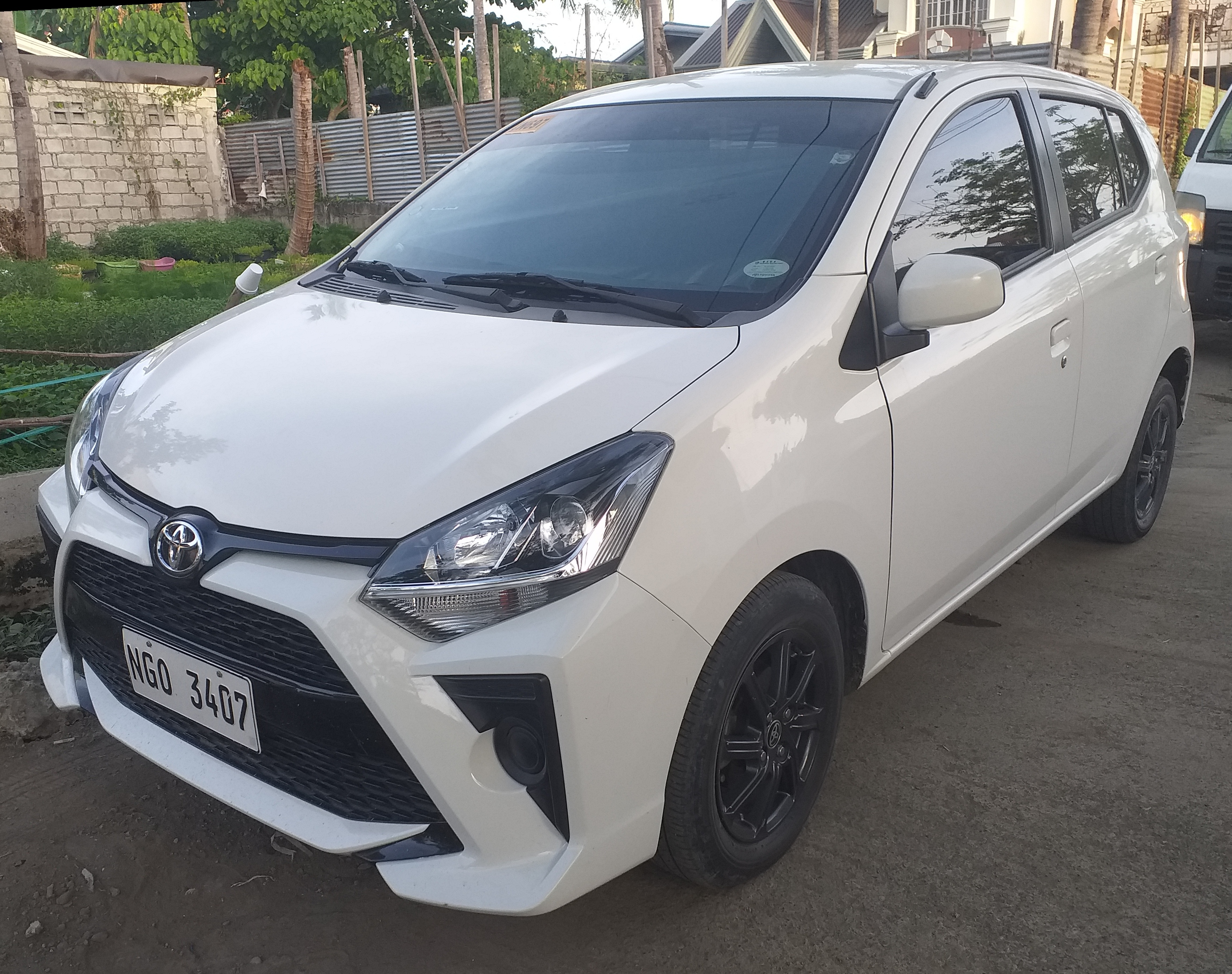
2020 Wigo 1.0 E (B100LA; second facelift, Philippines)

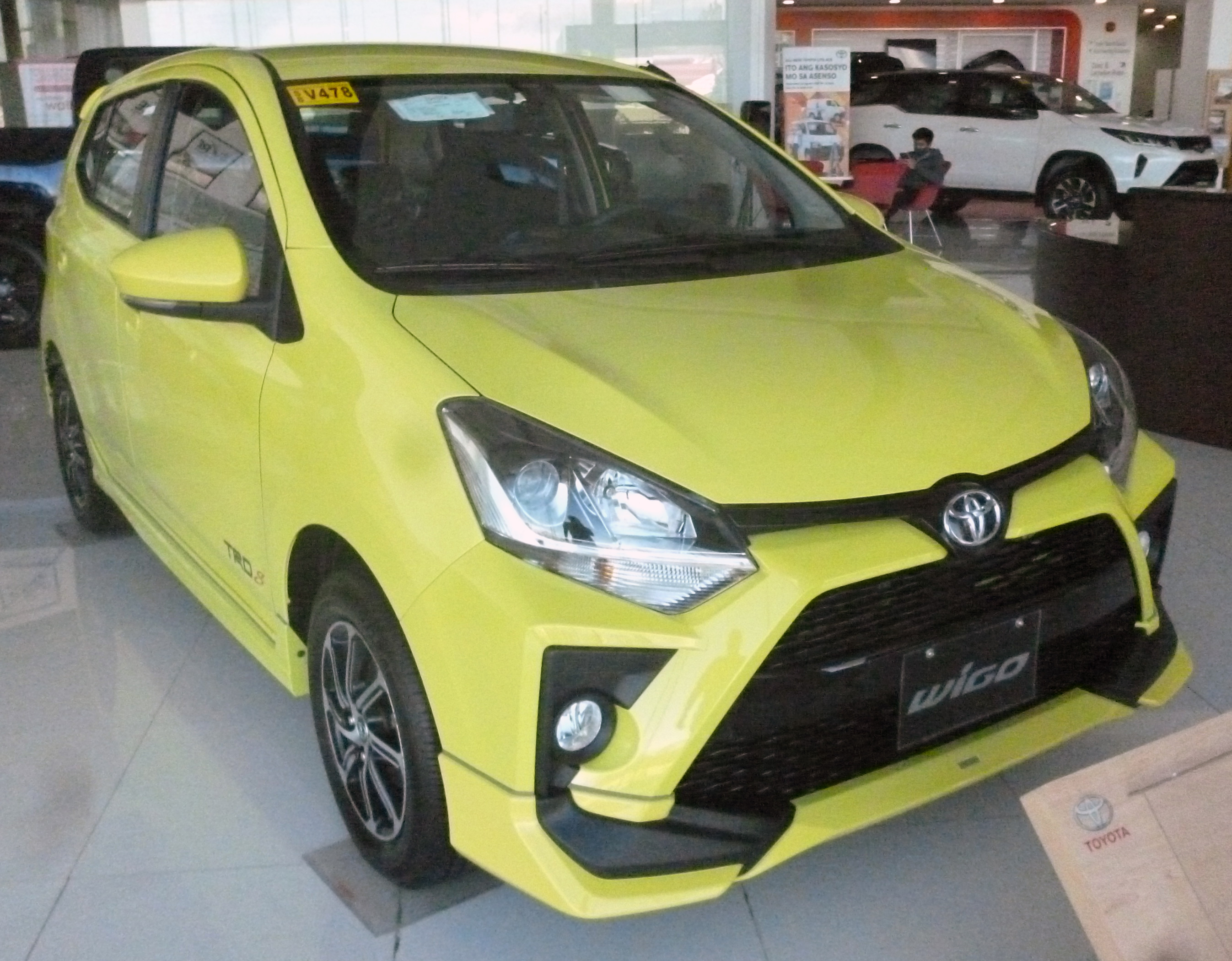
2022 Wigo 1.0 G TRD (B100LA; second facelift, Philippines)

==== Perodua Axia ====
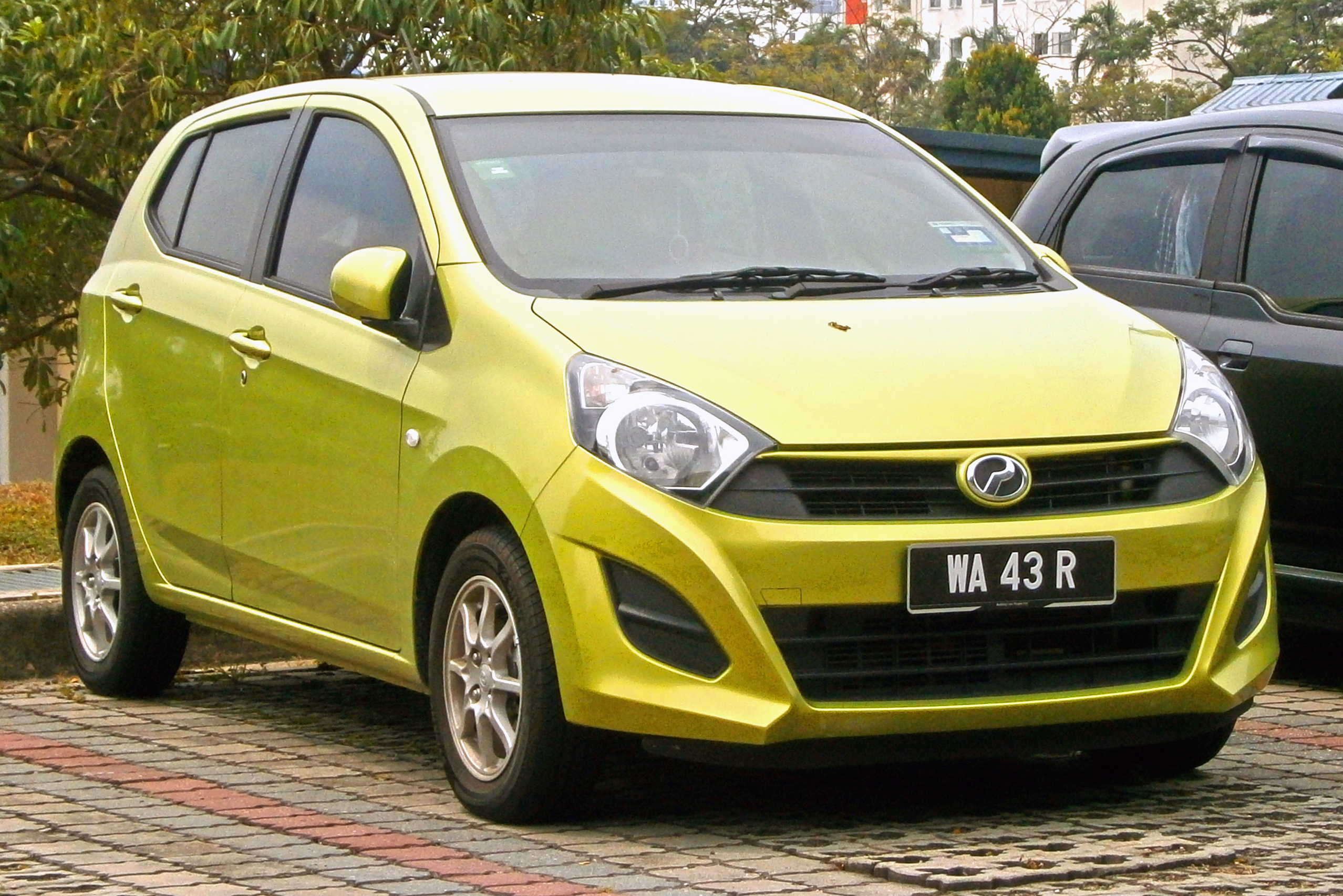
Perodua Axia

The Perodua Axia is a slightly reengineered version of the Ayla that was launched in Malaysia in 2014.

=== Concept models ===
==== Ayla Turbo Concept ====
The Ayla Turbo is a one-off concept car that was shown at the 26th Gaikindo Indonesia International Auto Show in August 2018, based on the 1.2-litre model. The two-tone red and black exterior colour is partially inspired from the 1984 Charade De Tomaso Turbo. The front and rear bumper design has also been redesigned. The 3NR-VE engine has been extensively modified by fitting a turbocharger that is equipped with intercooler, wastegate and blow-off valve with 0.5 bar (7.3 psi) of boost that uprates the power output to 147 kW (197 hp; 200 PS) and torque to 242 N⋅m (178 lbf⋅ft). Further engine changes include the use of low-compression piston, dual fuel injector, open air filter and stronger connecting rod. The 3-module piggyback has been used to manipulate the engine data for performance orientation, while the exhaust system uses a stainless steel free-flow type with a diameter of 63.5 mm (2.5 in). The interior has been stripped down in order to gain lower weight and the roll cage has been added, along with FIA-certified Sparco racing bucket seats. The AC and other non-essential features have also been removed. The car made a claimed 0-100 km/h (62 mph) acceleration in 10.3 seconds, 2.3 seconds faster than the standard car. The car was still in developmental phase at the time and costs around Rp 500,000,000 (US$35,100 as of March 2019) to build.

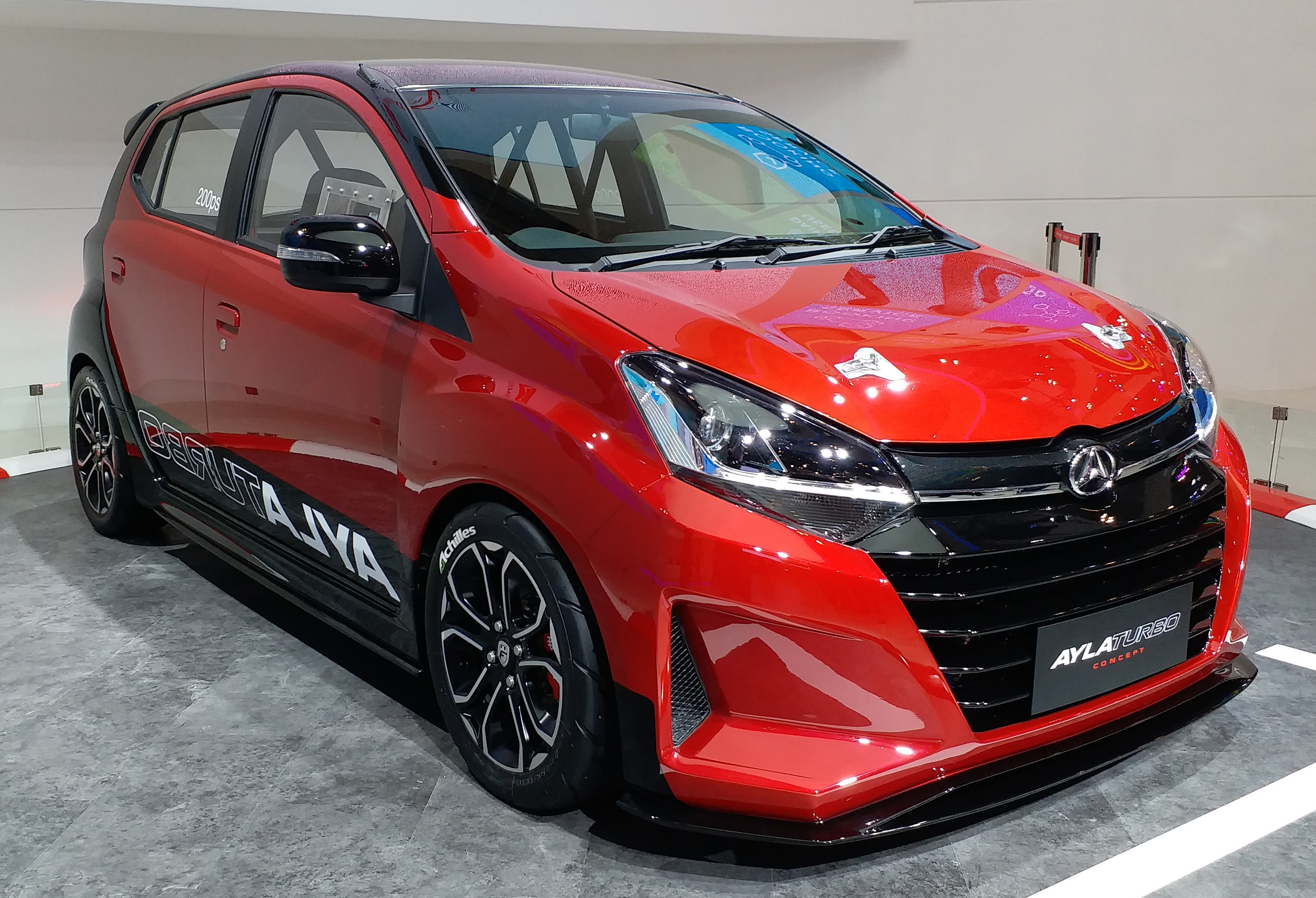
Ayla Turbo front quarter view

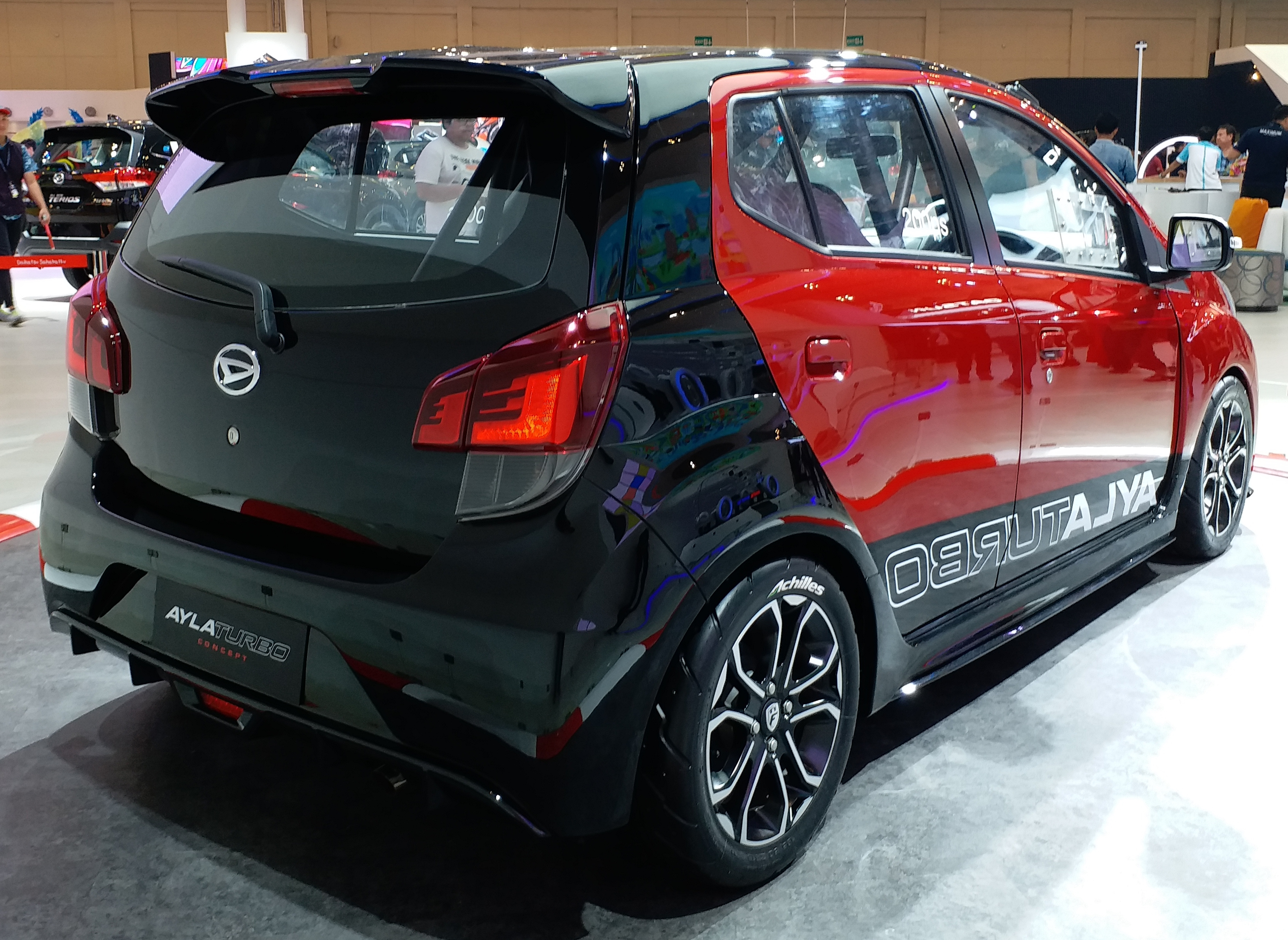
Ayla Turbo rear quarter view

==== Ayla BEV Concept ====
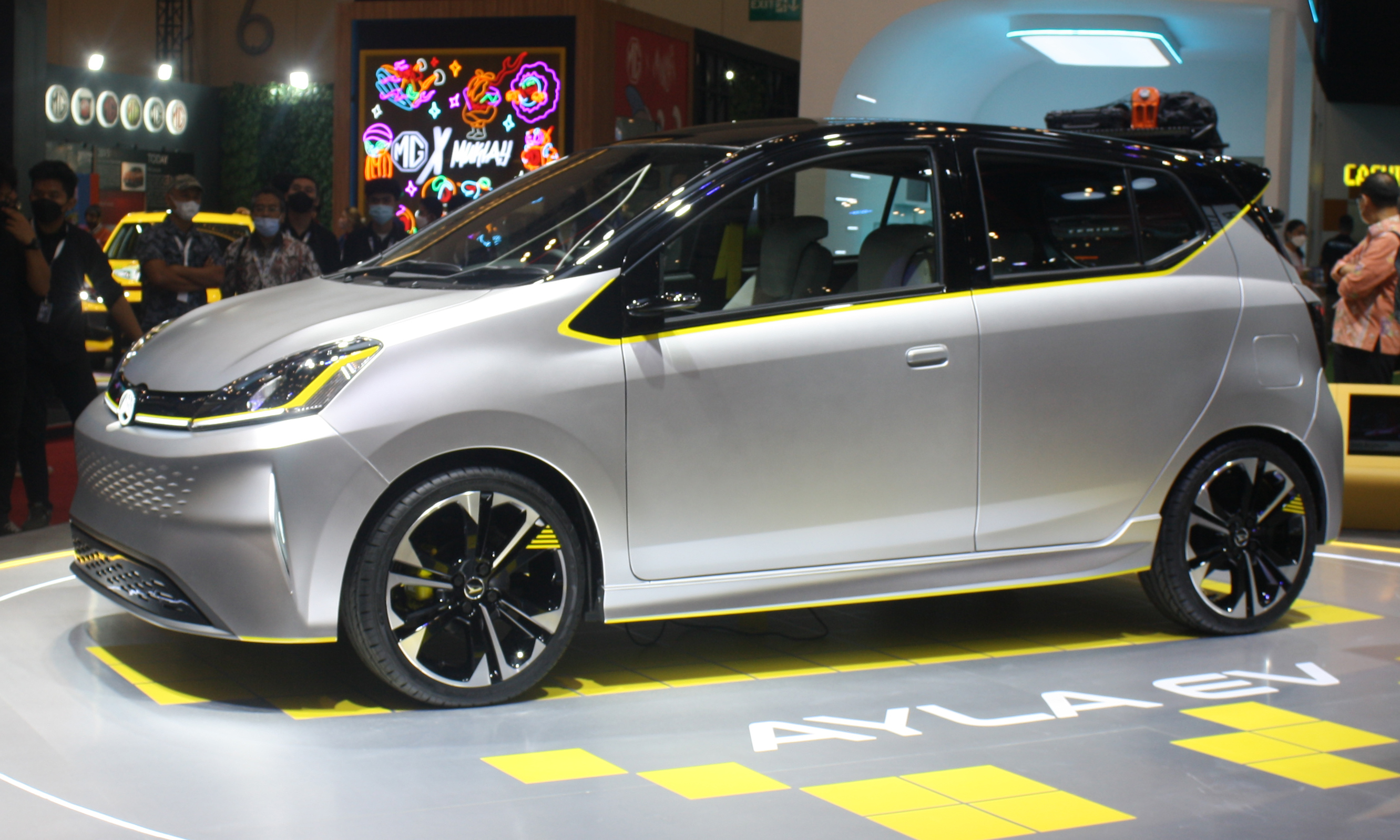
Ayla BEV

The Ayla BEV is an EV conversion prototype that was first presented at the 29th Gaikindo Indonesia International Auto Show on 11 August 2022. The storage battery uses a 32 kWh unit, while the electric motor is rated at 60 kW (80 hp; 82 PS). The suspension was made stronger due to the car being heavier than the regular ICE-powered model.

=== Safety ===
ASEAN NCAP test results Daihatsu Ayla (2012)
Test	Points	Stars
Adult occupant:	5.56	4 /5 stars
Child occupant:	51%	3 /5 stars
Safety assist:	NA	

ASEAN NCAP test results Daihatsu Ayla (2015)
Test	Points	Stars
Adult occupant:	5.56	1 /5 stars
Child occupant:	47%	2 /5 stars
Safety assist:	NA	

ASEAN NCAP test results Toyota Agya (2015)
Test	Points	Stars
Adult occupant:	12.84	4 /5 stars
Child occupant:	82%	4 /5 stars
Safety assist:	NA	

== Second generation (A350; 2023) ==
Second generation
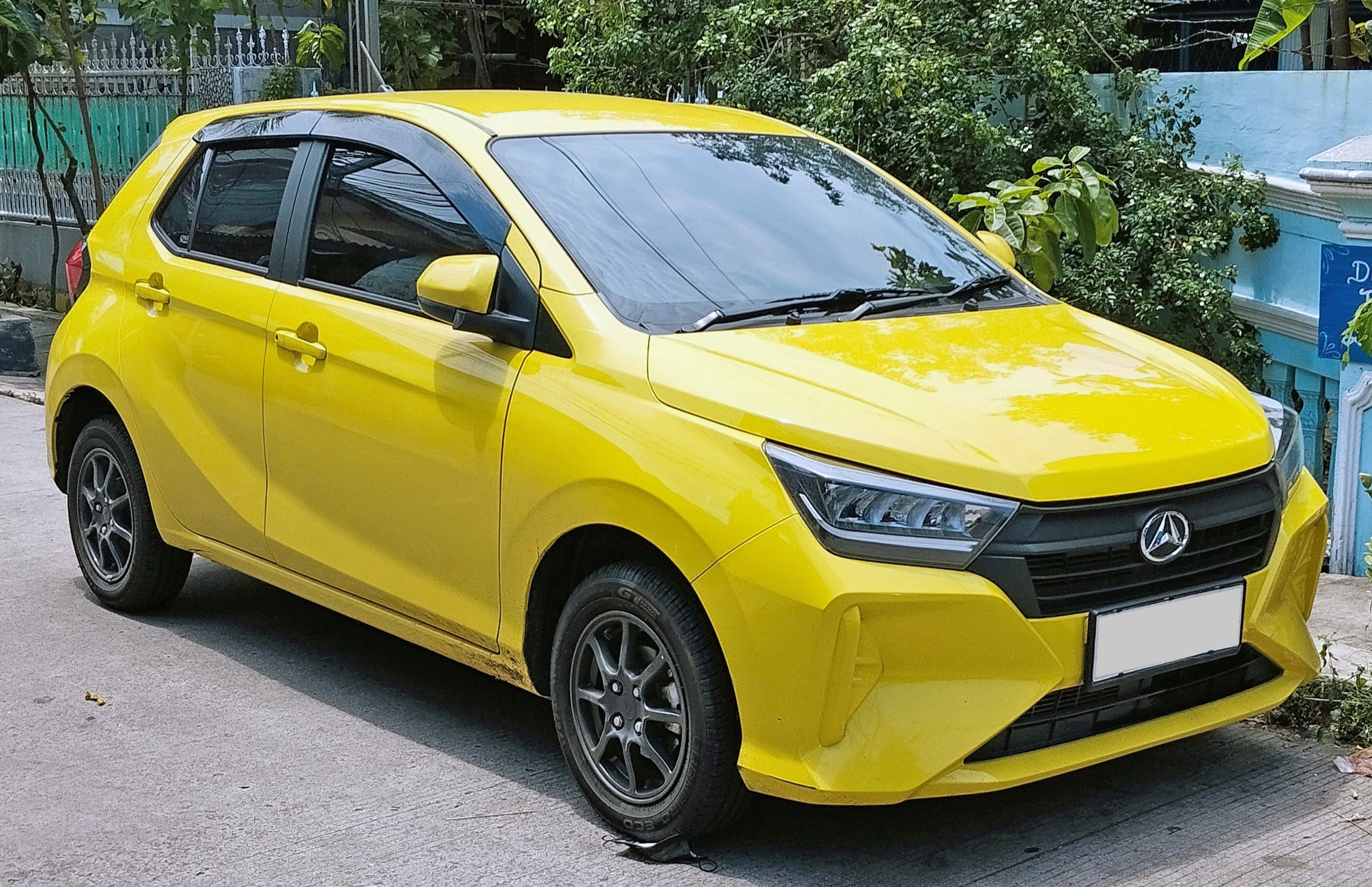
- 2023 Ayla 1.2 R (A351RS, Indonesia)

Overview
- Model code: A350
- Also called: Toyota Agya; Toyota Wigo; Perodua Axia (Malaysia)
- Production: March 2023 – present
- Designer: Katsutaro Kimura, Noor Amzari Bin Mohd Nor, Shinji Tamura, Toshiaki Okamoto and Yoshihisa Okuno

Body and chassis
- Platform: Daihatsu New Global Architecture: DNGA-A
- Related: Daihatsu Rocky (A200)

Powertrain
- Engine: Petrol: 998 cc 1KR-VE I3 (A350); 1196 cc WA-VE I3 (A351)
- Power output: 50 kW (67 hp; 68 PS) (1KR-VE); 65 kW (87 hp; 88 PS) (WA-VE)
- Transmission: 5-speed manual; D-CVT

Dimensions
- Wheelbase: 2,525 mm (99.4 in)
- Length: 3,760 mm (148.0 in)
- Width: 1,665 mm (65.6 in)
- Height: 1,505 mm (59.3 in)
- Kerb weight: 885–890 kg (1,951–1,962 lb)

The second-generation Agya was unveiled in Indonesia on 13 February 2023, followed by the Ayla on 15 February. Sales were commenced at the 2nd Gaikindo Jakarta Auto Week on 10 March 2023. The cars shared the same DNGA-A platform with the A200 series Rocky crossover SUV, resulting in a longer body and wheelbase.

The development of the second-generation Ayla and Agya was paralleled with the second-generation Perodua Axia, and was led by chief engineer Toshihiro Nakaho from Daihatsu.

Powertrain updates include the 68ps 1.0-litre 1KR-VE and the 88ps 1.2-litre WA-VE three-cylinder engines. Both engines are paired with either a 5-speed manual transmission or a Daihatsu-developed CVT, which is marketed by Daihatsu as "Dual-Mode CVT" (D-CVT).

=== Specifications ===
==== Ayla ====
The second-generation Ayla shared the same styling with the second-generation Axia, notably its front fascia and headlights. The Ayla is available in three trim levels: 1.0 M, 1.0 X and 1.2 R. All trim levels are available with 5-speed manual as standard, while the latter two are offered with CVT transmission as an option. Optional Astra Daihatsu Styling (ADS) package with aero kits and other accessories is also offered for the latter two trims.

==== Toyota Agya ====
The Indonesian market Agya is available in three trim levels: E, G and GR Sport, all powered by the 1.2-litre engine with 5-speed manual for all trim levels, and CVT for the latter two. For the GR Sport trim, the Garuda-inspired front badge on the front grille was replaced by the regular Toyota emblem, and the "Astra Toyota" badging on the tailgate was removed. As a result, the trim is not eligible for LCGC regulations, resulting in an upmarket positioning. Aside from aero kits, the GR Sport trim also received specially tuned power steering programming, steering gear, shock absorbers and coil springs. The Stylix based on G CVT trim with GR Parts package was introduced at the 32nd Indonesia International Motor Show on 13 February 2025.

For exported models to Latin America, the Agya uses the front fascia from the Ayla.

===== Costa Rica =====
The Agya was launched in Costa Rica on 25 September 2023, with two trim levels: New Line and High Line. The former trim is equipped with a 1.0-litre petrol and the latter trim equipped with a 1.2-litre petrol paired only to a CVT.

===== Ecuador =====
The Agya was launched in Ecuador on 15 September 2023, as a sole variant powered by a 1.2-litre petrol engine paired with a 5-speed manual.

===== Panama =====
The Agya was launched in Panama on 23 October 2023, with three variants: 1.0 Base M/T, 1.0 A/T and 1.2 A/T.

===== Peru =====
The Agya was launched in Peru on 9 October 2023, with three variants: 1.0 M/T, 1.2 M/T and 1.2 A/T.

===== Venezuela =====
The Agya was launched in Venezuela on 27 February 2025, with two variants: 1.2 M/T and 1.2 A/T.

==== Toyota Wigo ====
===== Brunei =====
The Wigo was launched in Brunei on 1 September 2023. It is offered only in E variant and it is powered with the 1.0-litre engine, paired to a CVT as standard.

===== Cambodia =====
The Wigo was launched together with the AC200 Yaris Cross in Cambodia on 7 July 2023. It is offered in a single trim level and powered only with the 1.0-litre engine, paired to a CVT.

===== Philippines =====
The Wigo was launched in the Philippines on 14 July 2023. It is offered in three trim levels: J, E, and G, all powered by the 67hp 1.0-litre engine with 5-speed manual for the J trim, and CVT for the latter two trims.

===== Vietnam =====
The Wigo was launched in the Vietnamese market on 6 June 2023. It is available in two trim levels: E and G, all powered by the 1.2-litre engine with 5-speed manual for the E trim, and CVT for the G trim.

=== Gallery ===
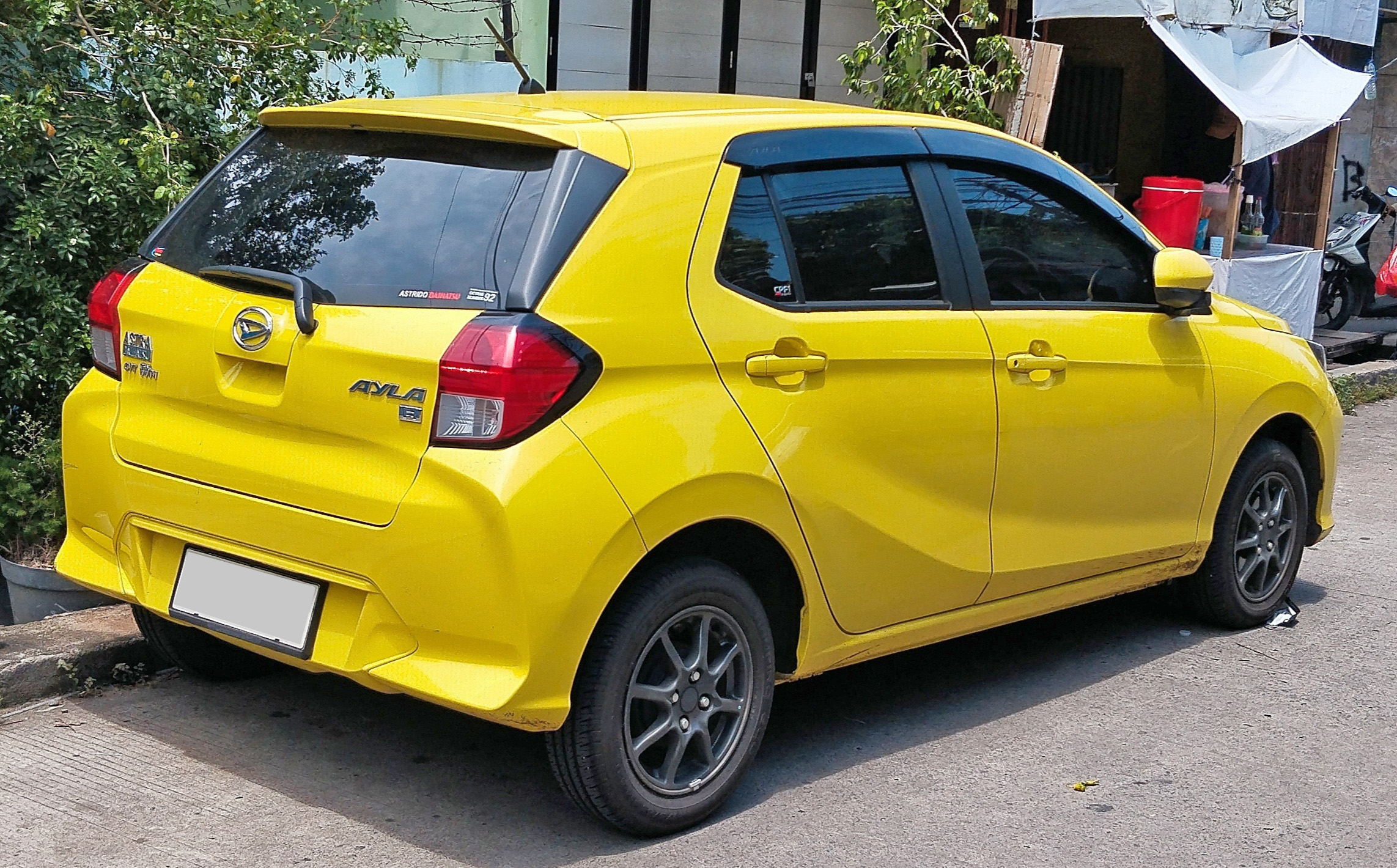
2023 Ayla 1.2 R (A351RS, Indonesia)

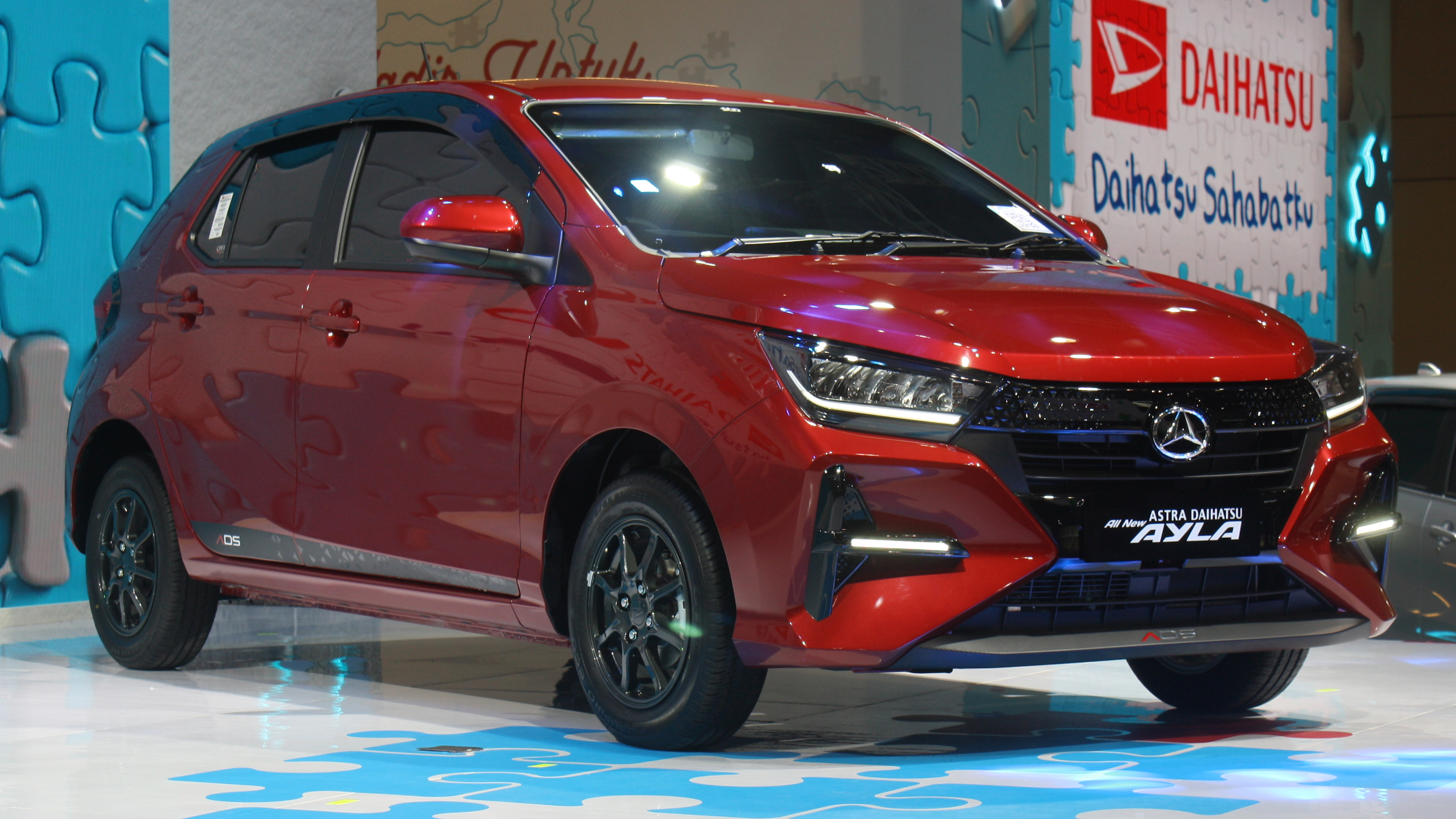
2023 Ayla 1.2 R ADS (A351RS, Indonesia)

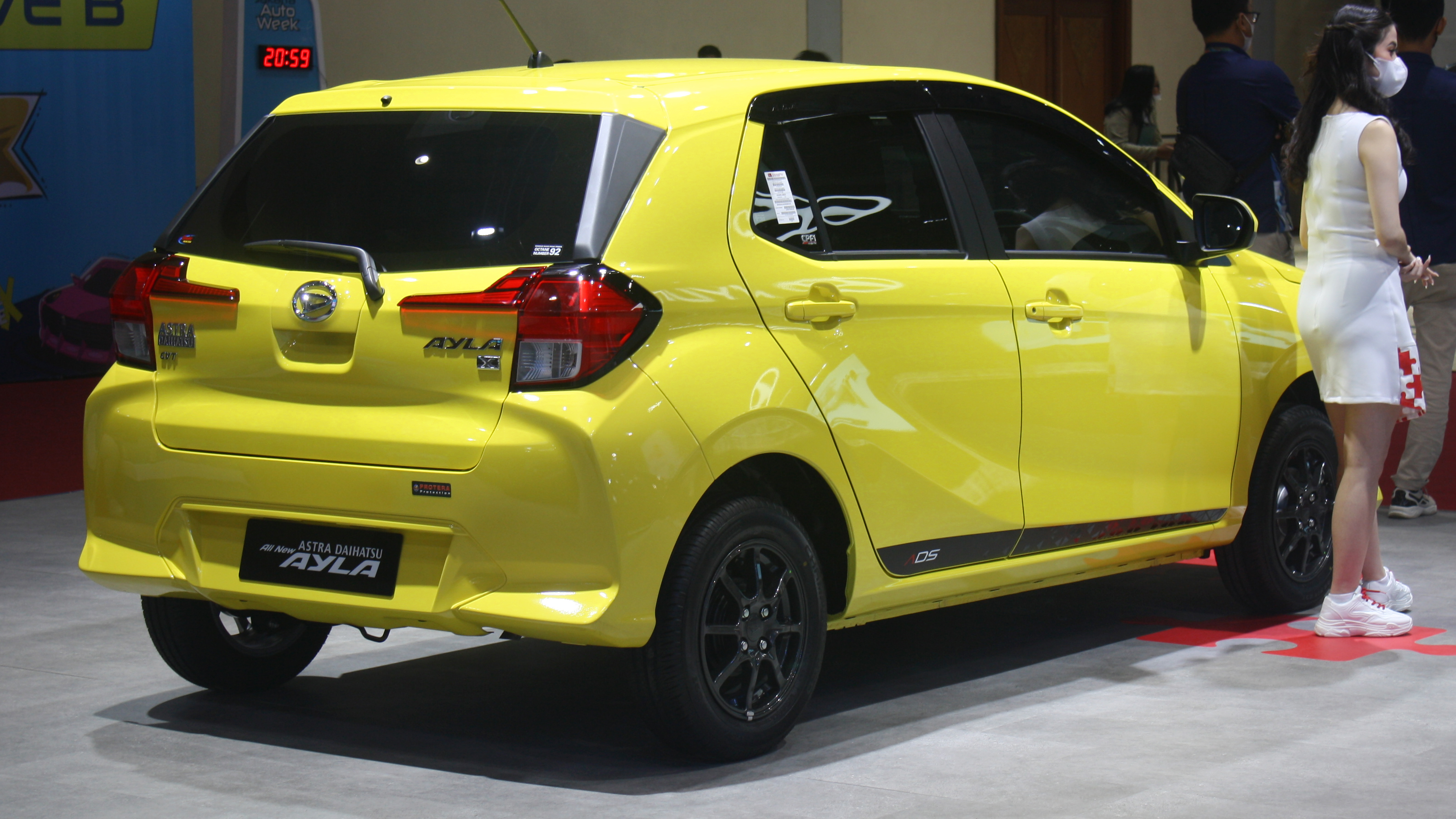
2023 Ayla 1.0 X ADS (A350RS, Indonesia)

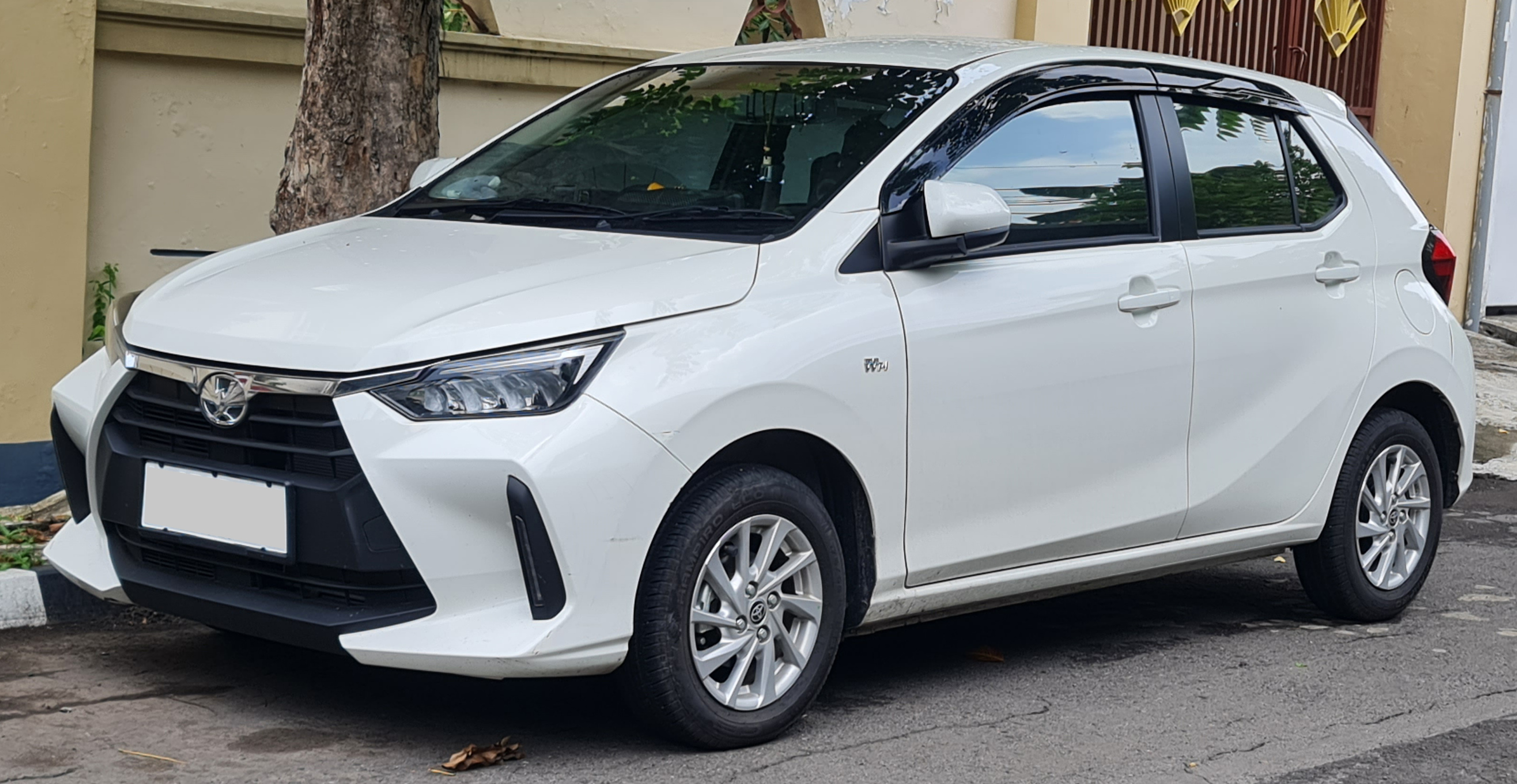
2024 Agya 1.2 G (A351RA, Indonesia)

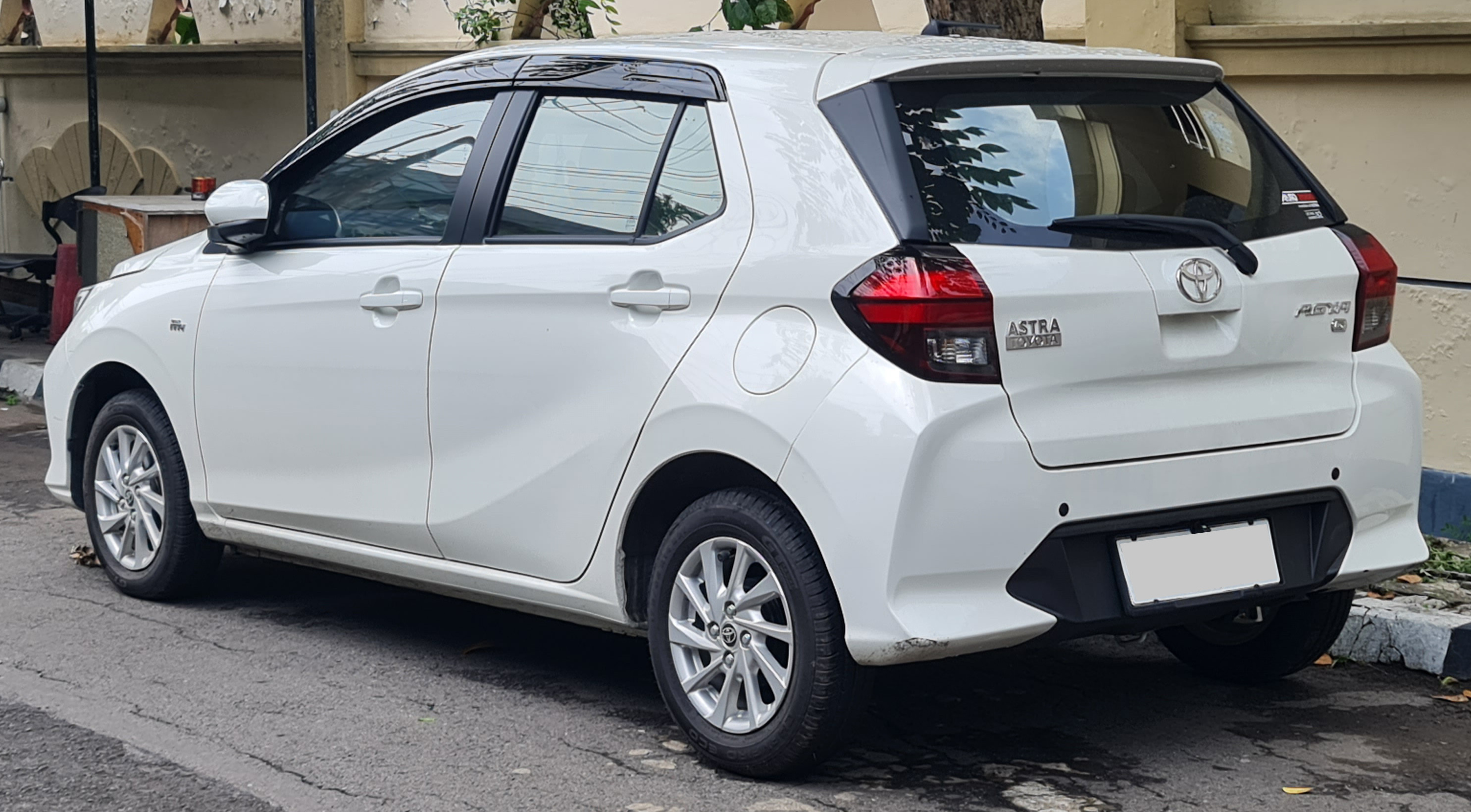
2024 Agya 1.2 G (A351RA, Indonesia)

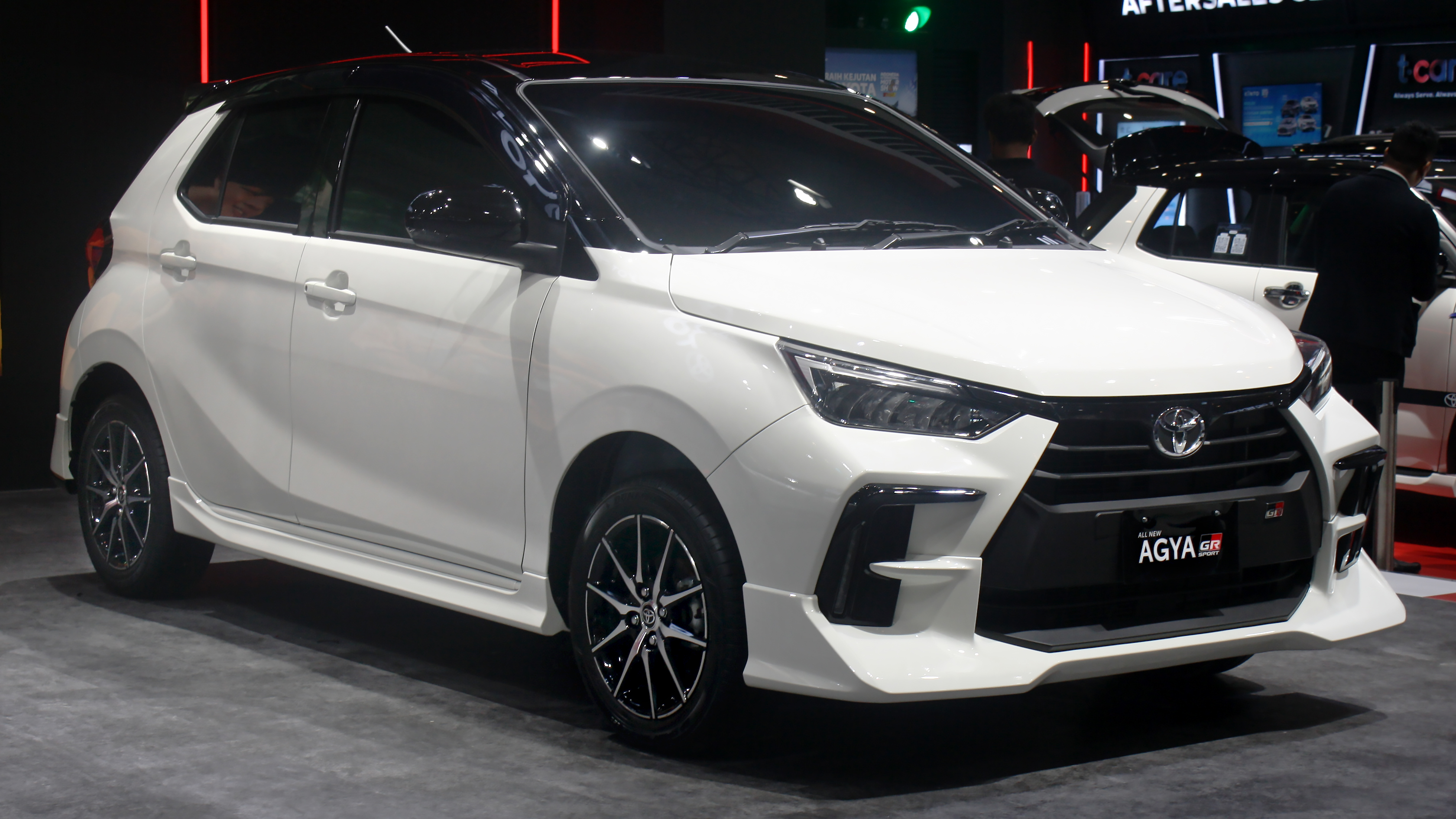
2023 Agya 1.2 GR Sport (A351RA, Indonesia)

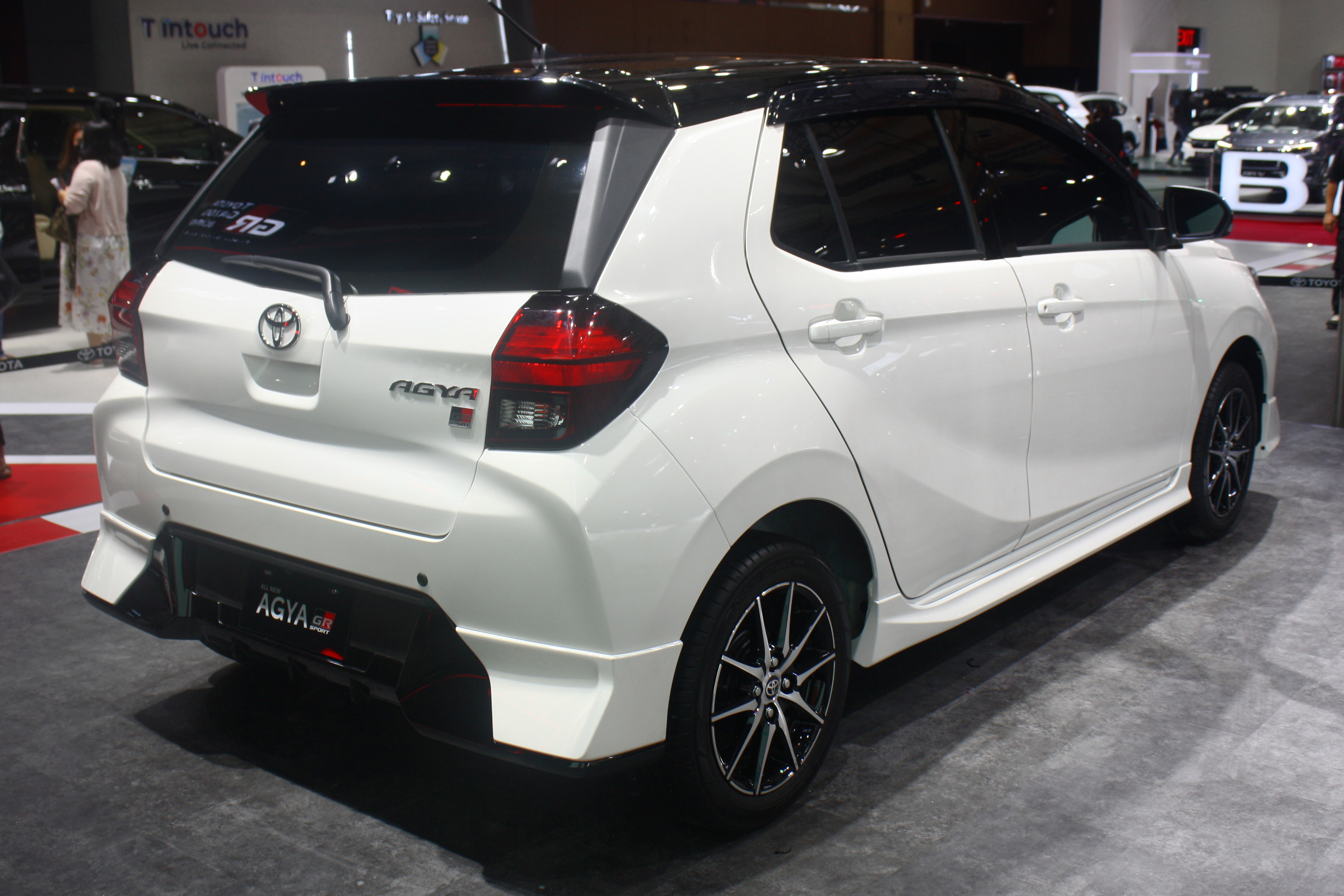
2023 Agya 1.2 GR Sport (A351RA, Indonesia)

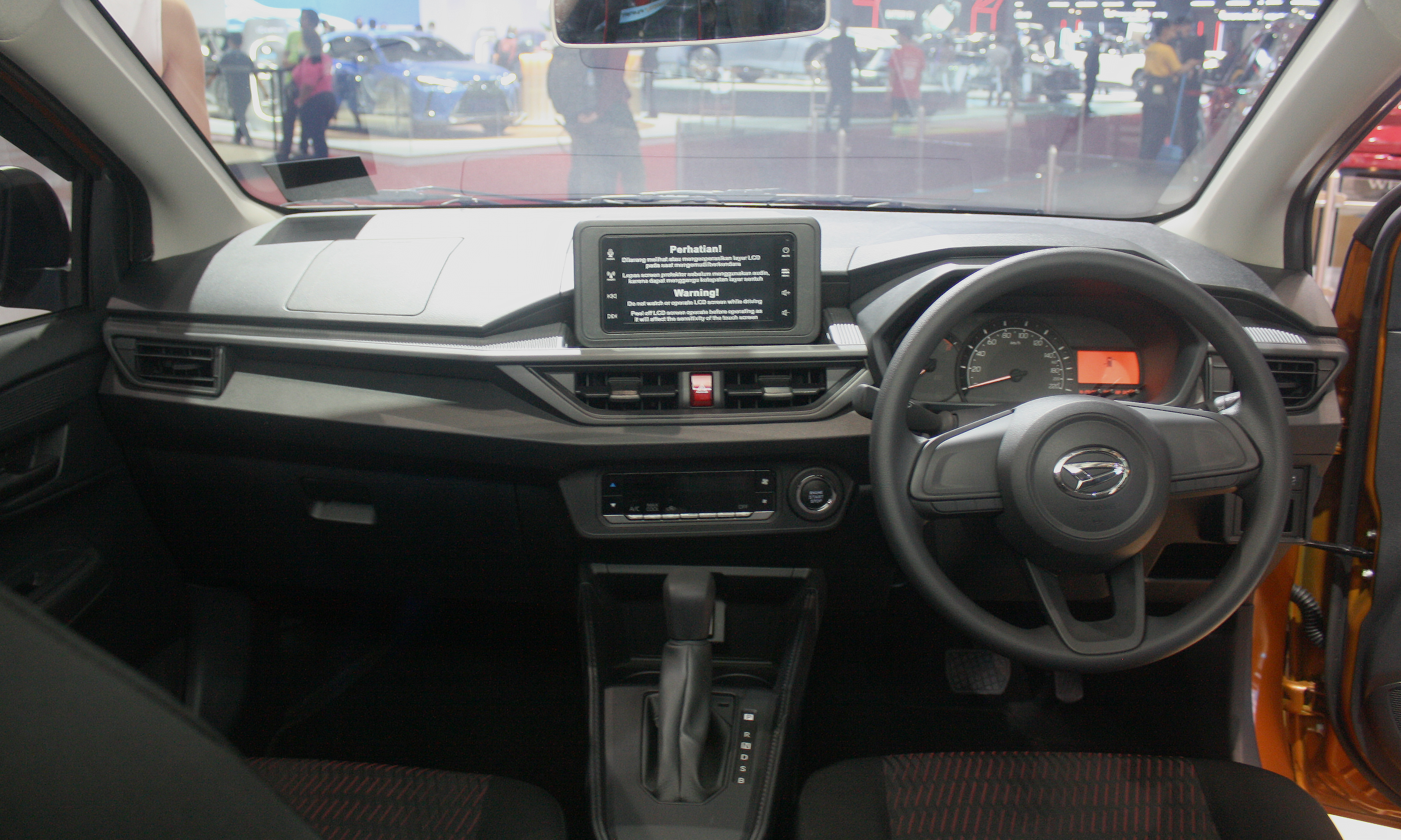
2023 Ayla 1.2 R interior (Indonesia)

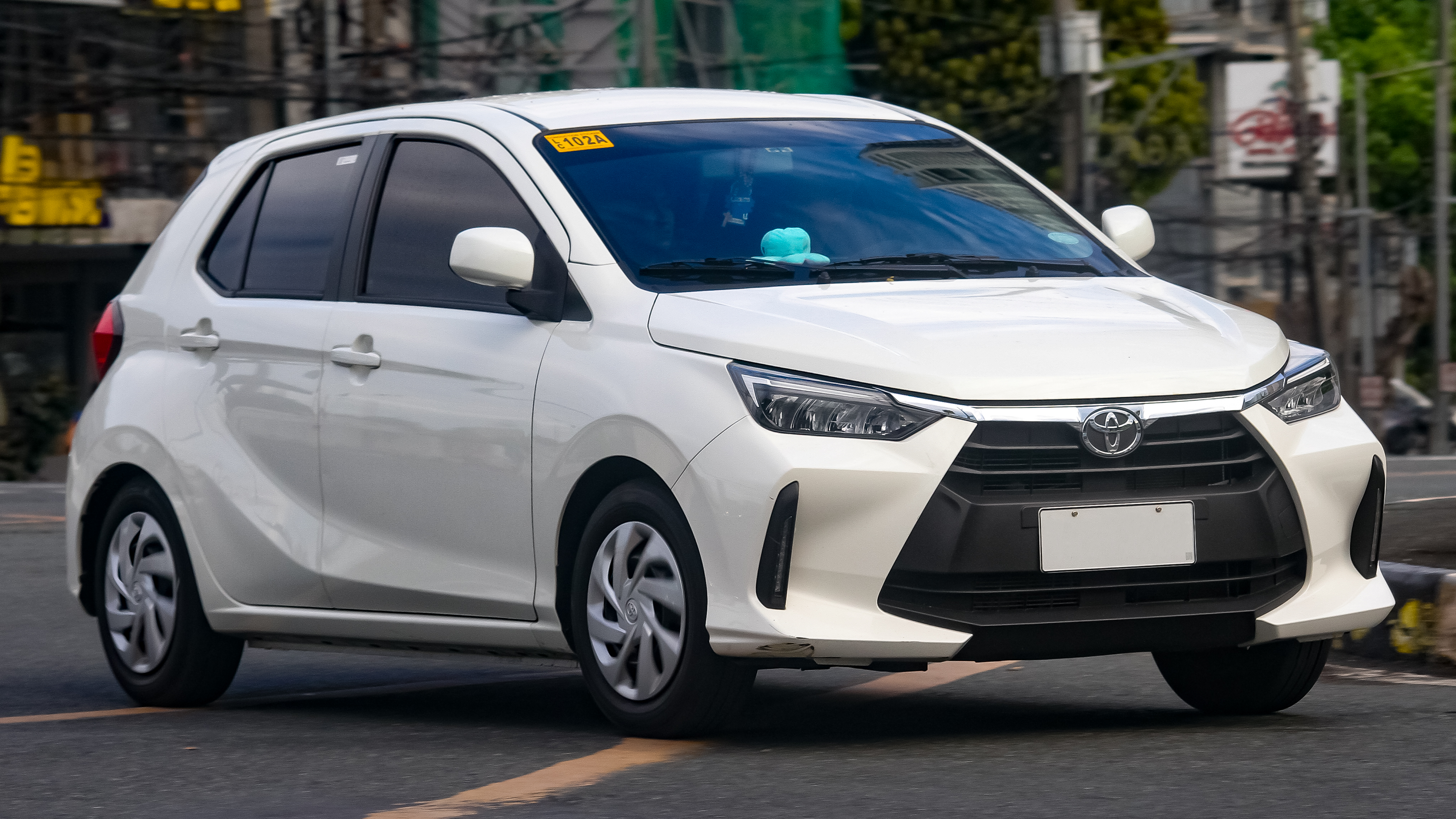
2023 Toyota Wigo 1.0 J (A350LA, Philippines)

==== Side collision test manipulation ====
On 28 April 2023, Daihatsu confirmed that the company had committed "wrongdoings" in approval application for side collision tests under UN-R95 requirements for four vehicles, including the A350 series Toyota Agya. According to Daihatsu, the inside lining of the front seat door was improperly modified with a "notch" to prevent the part from breaking into pieces with sharp edges that could injure occupants during a side airbag deployment. These modifications are not present in production vehicles. In response, Toyota chairman Akio Toyoda and Toyota president Koji Sato publicly apologized. For the Agya, only vehicles bound to be sold in Ecuador would be affected. Toyota had re-tested the model before delivering it to markets with UN-R95 side crash test regulations.

== Sales ==
As of February 2020, more than 214,000 units of Ayla had been sold in Indonesia. 278,465 units of Agya had also been sold as well.

Year	Indonesia		Philippines	Vietnam
Year	Daihatsu Ayla	Toyota Agya	Toyota Wigo	
2013	19,141	22,376		
2014	40,775	67,074	9,062	
2015	35,084	57,646	13,433	
2016	39,087	45,009	18,430	
2017	28,051	29,004	19,295	
2018	26,952	29,106	21,234	
2019	22,108	25,082	18,183	6,876
2020	13,091	12,952	11,853	2,561
2021	21,384	16,992	17,491	2,492
2022	23,500	21,336	14,306	488
2023	23,758	20,602	14,676	1,748
2024	17,456	19,795	18,103	
2025	10,750	15,993		

== Recall ==
In September 2018, Toyota Motor Philippines issued a recall notice on over 15,000 Wigos produced from 5 April to 15 December 2017. The affected units have a faulty engine wire that may break from engine vibration, resulting in a decrease in engine power and a warning light illumination.
