= Perodua Axia =

Malaysian city car

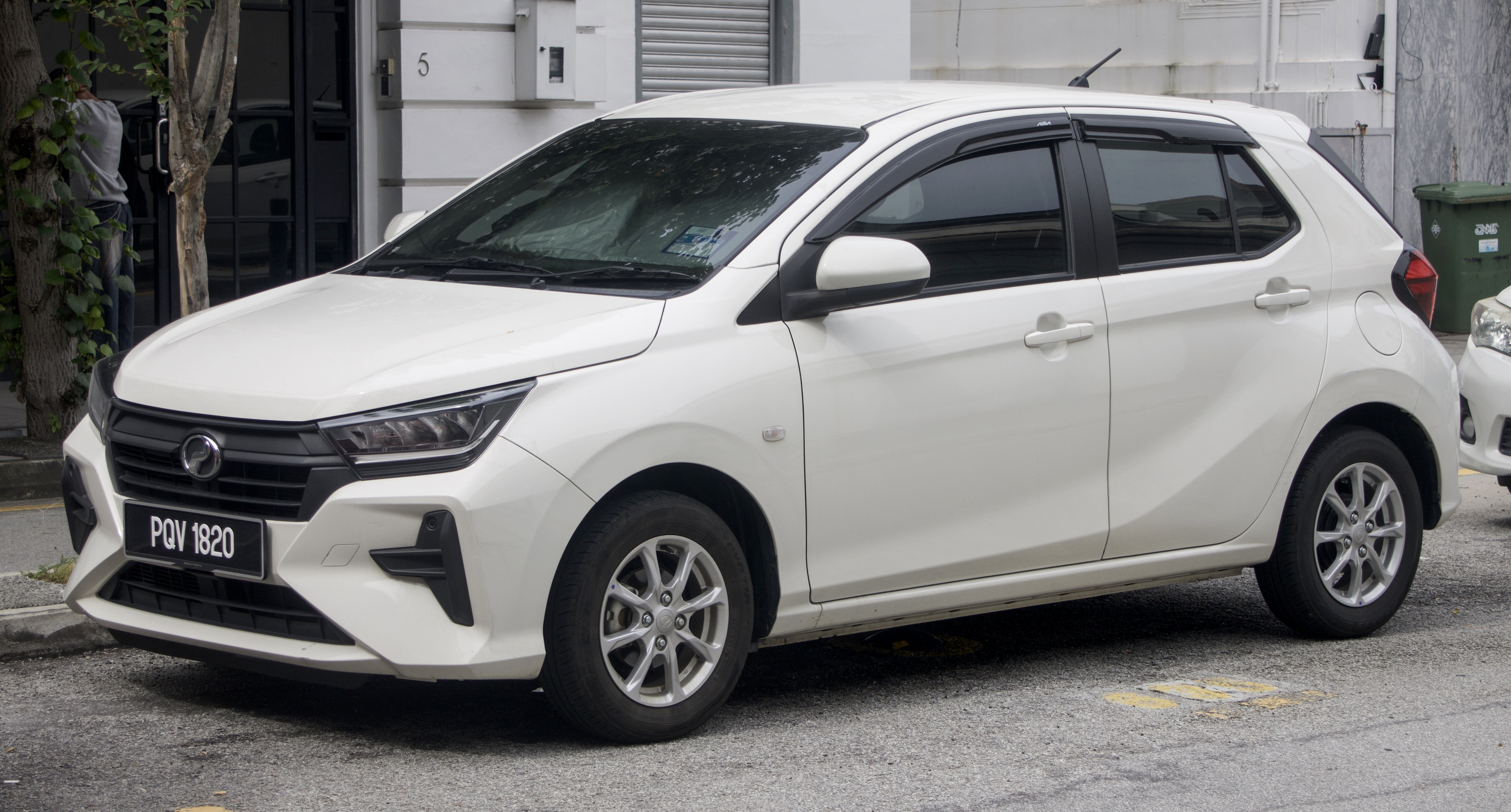
- 2024 Perodua Axia X

Overview
- Manufacturer: Perodua
- Production: 2014–present
- Assembly: Malaysia: Serendah (PGMSB)

Body and chassis
- Class: City car (A)
- Body style: 5-door hatchback
- Layout: Front-engine, front-wheel-drive

Chronology
- Predecessor: Perodua Viva

The Perodua Axia is a city car produced by Malaysian automobile manufacturer Perodua. It was launched on 15 September 2014 as the successor to the Viva. The car takes over the title of being the most affordable car in Malaysia from the Viva, and the best-selling car in Malaysia for three consecutive years, between 2015 until 2017. The Axia is the first model to debut from Perodua's all-new second factory in Rawang, Selangor. As of mid-2023, the Axia reached 600,000 units sold since the launch of its first generation in 2014.

The name "Axia", which is pronounced a-zee-a or A-xia, is derived from the Greek word ΑΞΙΑ (axia) which means value. The word Axia also resembles the word Asia but with the letter 's' having been replaced by 'x' which represents the number ten, as the Axia is Perodua's tenth model.

== First generation (B200; 2014) ==
First generation
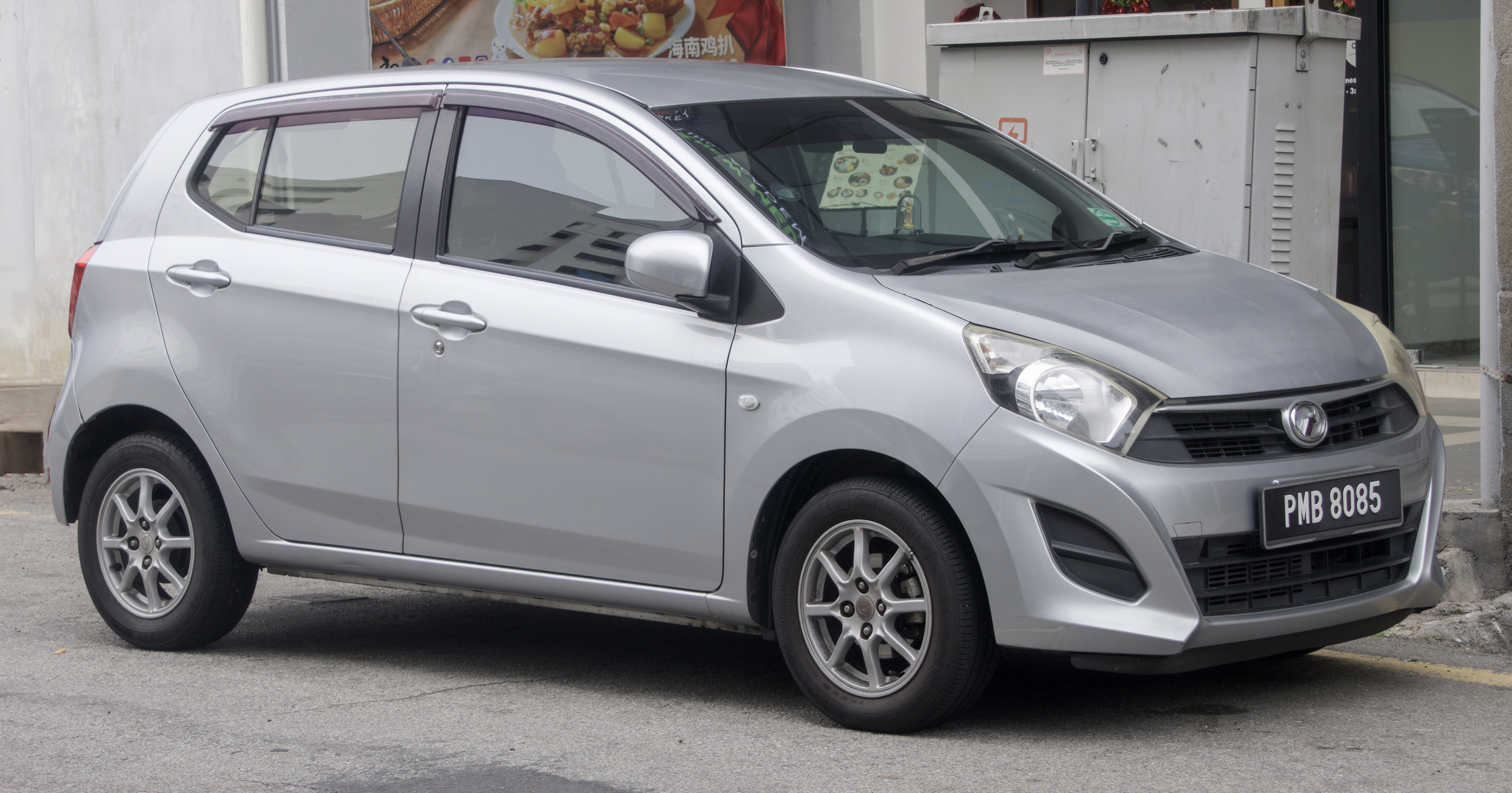
- 2015 Perodua Axia G

Overview
- Model code: B200
- Production: September 2014 – December 2022; September 2014 – October 2026 (base 'E' variant)

Body and chassis
- Platform: Daihatsu Global A-Segment Platform
- Related: Daihatsu Ayla; Toyota Agya; Toyota Wigo; Perodua Bezza; Daihatsu Sigra

Powertrain
- Engine: Petrol: 1.0 L 1KR-DE2 I3 (2014–2017); 1.0 L 1KR-VE I3 (2017–2026)
- Transmission: 5-speed manual; 4-speed automatic

Dimensions
- Wheelbase: 2,455 mm (96.7 in)
- Length: 3,645–3,650 mm (143.5–143.7 in)
- Width: 1,620–1,625 mm (63.8–64.0 in)
- Height: 1,510–1,525 mm (59.4–60.0 in)
- Kerb weight: 825–865 kg (1,819–1,907 lb)

The Axia was developed as the successor to the Viva. Perodua chose to license the Daihatsu Ayla/Toyota Agya platform for their Viva Replacement Model (VRM). The Ayla and Agya duo have been on sale in neighbouring Indonesia and Philippines since 2013. Although the Viva replacement model will be based on the Ayla/Agya platform, Perodua has iterated that the upper body and external elements will be indigenously designed, and the car would not be just a rebadged model.

On 26 August 2013, the sixth Prime Minister of Malaysia, Najib Razak announced that the replacement model to the Viva will launch in 2014 as the cheapest new car on the market. The new model will be built at Perodua's all-new RM1.3 billion, 65,000 sq ft second manufacturing plant, located adjacent to the company's original factory in Rawang, Selangor. Perodua's new factory will mirror Daihatsu Kyushu's factory in terms of work ethics, technology and efficiency. Perodua has since announced the construction of a new engine manufacturing factory in Sendayan, Negeri Sembilan at cost of RM600 million.

Perodua showcased the Global Model A Segment Space (GMA) concept at the 2013 Kuala Lumpur International Motor Show in November. The GMA previewed the interior design of the Viva Replacement Model (VRM). Perodua also showcased a new engine, the 1.0-litre Daihatsu 1KR-DE as a possible candidate for the VRM.

On 11 August 2014, Perodua teased a photo of the Axia on their official Facebook page. Perodua released a teaser of the front end of the Axia Standard E and G variants on 19 August 2014.

The more expensive Axia SE and Advance variants sport a more aggressive and sporty exterior, whereas the cheaper Standard E and G trim lines offer a more modest and basic package.

Perodua claimed that the all-new Axia will have 95% locally sourced content, with the remainder being imported from Indonesia and Japan. The company aims to sell 10,000 Axia units per month.

The pre-facelift Axia is briefly sold in Brunei by the previous Perodua's distributor, Econ Motors Sdn Bhd with the 1.0G variant (4-speed automatic) in August 2015, where the Toyota-branded twin model, the Wigo was also sold in the country before the Axia will be replaced by the identical Wigo in 2017.

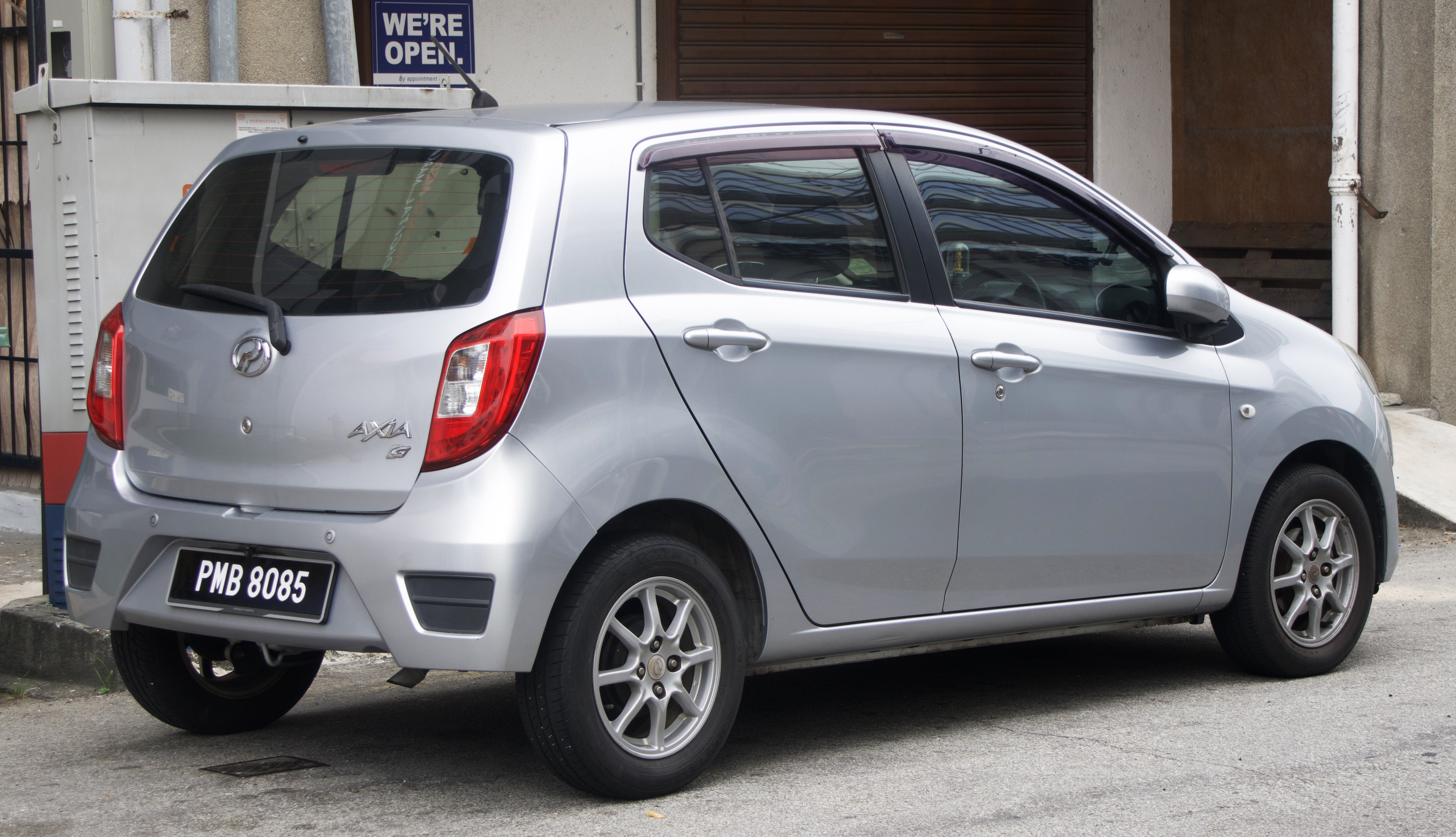
Rear view (G, pre-facelift)

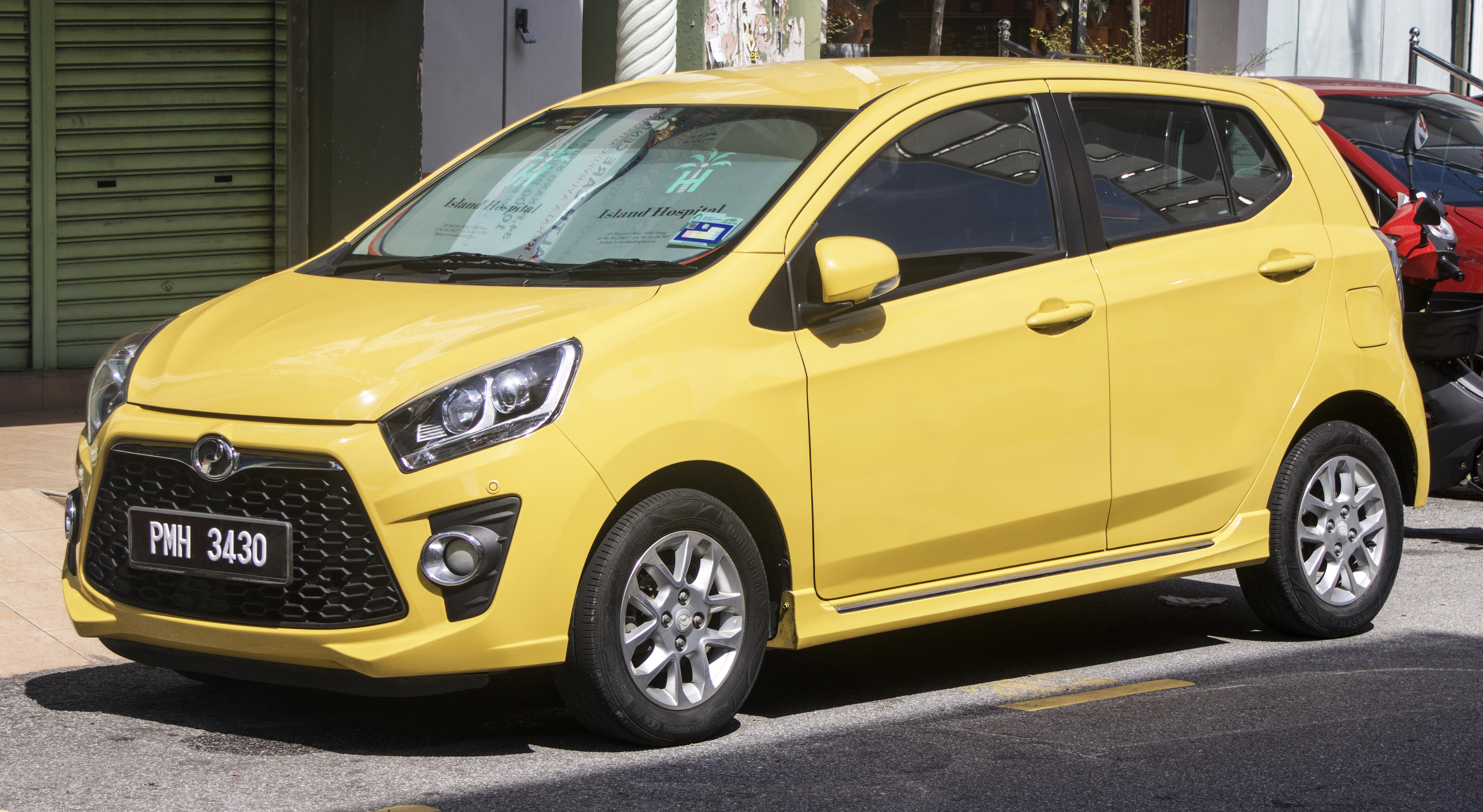
2015 Perodua Axia SE

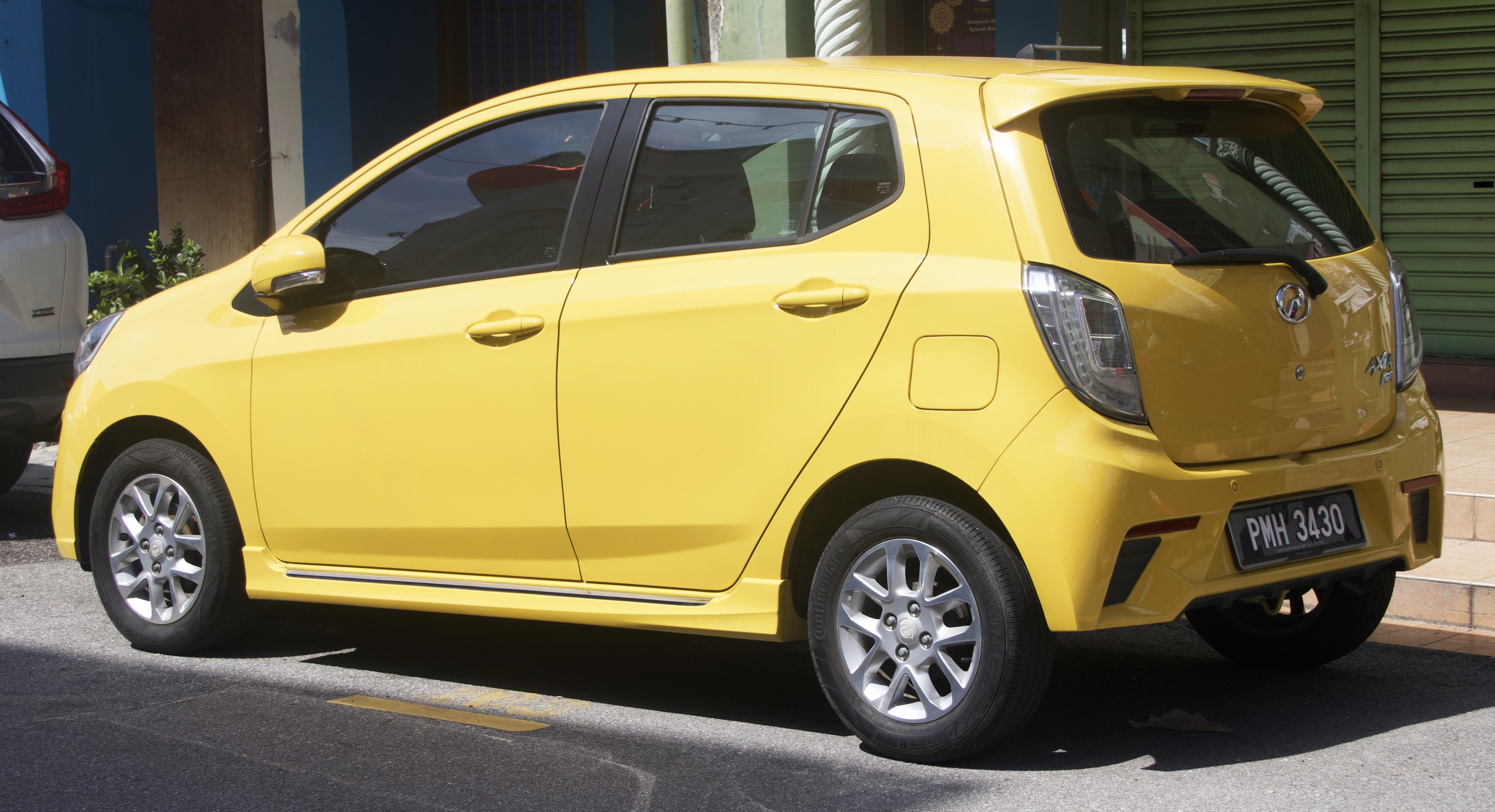
Rear view (SE, pre-facelift)

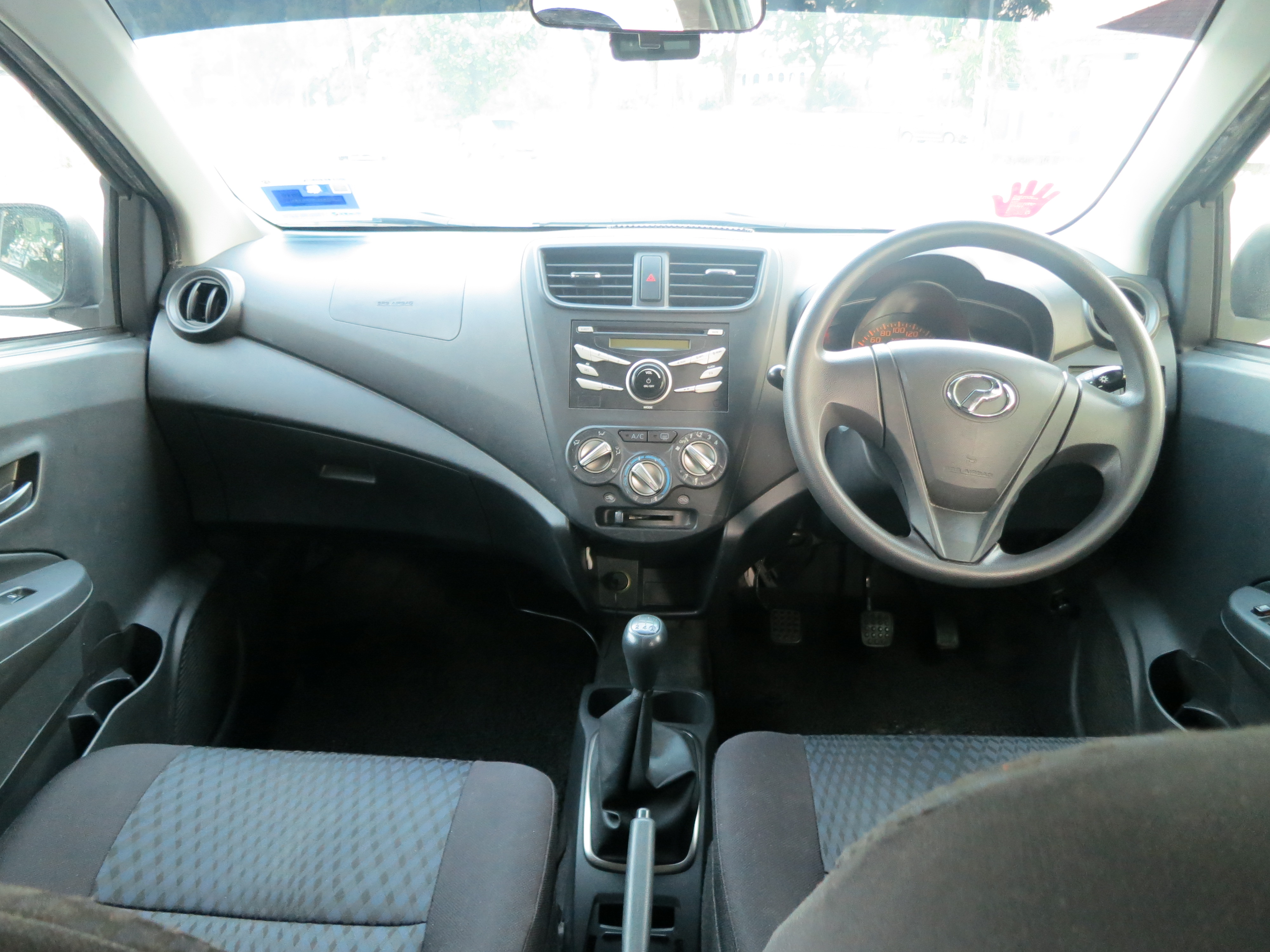
Interior (standard G variant)

=== Facelift ===
The Axia received first facelift update on 20 January 2017 with the new 1.0-litre VVT-i engine. The same four variants remained on sale. The facelift brought along revised front grille and bumpers, an external boot release and revised equipment list.

On 20 September 2019, the second-facelifted Axia was launched with six variants: E, G, GXtra, crossover-inspired Style, SE and AV. Only E variant has manual transmission while the rest have automatic transmissions with ABS and EBD. The 1KR-VE engine also retained. At this facelift, both SE and AV variants share similar appearance with E, G and GXtra variants with few trim differences. New safety features are fitted such as Vehicle Stability Control (VSC) for GXtra variant and upwards, and Advanced Safety Assist 2.0 (ASA 2.0) was available only on range-topping AV variant. Other features such as retractable side mirrors, reverse sensors, driver seat height adjuster and anti-snatch hook are fitted for GXtra variant and upwards also.

The crossover-inspired Style variant differs from other variants with SUV-style bumpers, decorative roof rails, different grille and clear tail lamps. The Style, together with SE and AV variants have keyless entry, push start button and white-illuminated meter panel as additional standard features.

With the second-generation Axia was launched on 14 February 2023, the previous-generation Axia E equipped with manual transmission will continue to be built as an entry-level option. The updated Axia E manual was reintroduced on 15 June 2023 as Malaysia's cheapest car priced at RM22,000 (about $4,770). It uses the 2017 facelift grille on the front while the 2019 facelift styling retained on the rear portion of the bumper.

==== 2017 first facelift styling ====
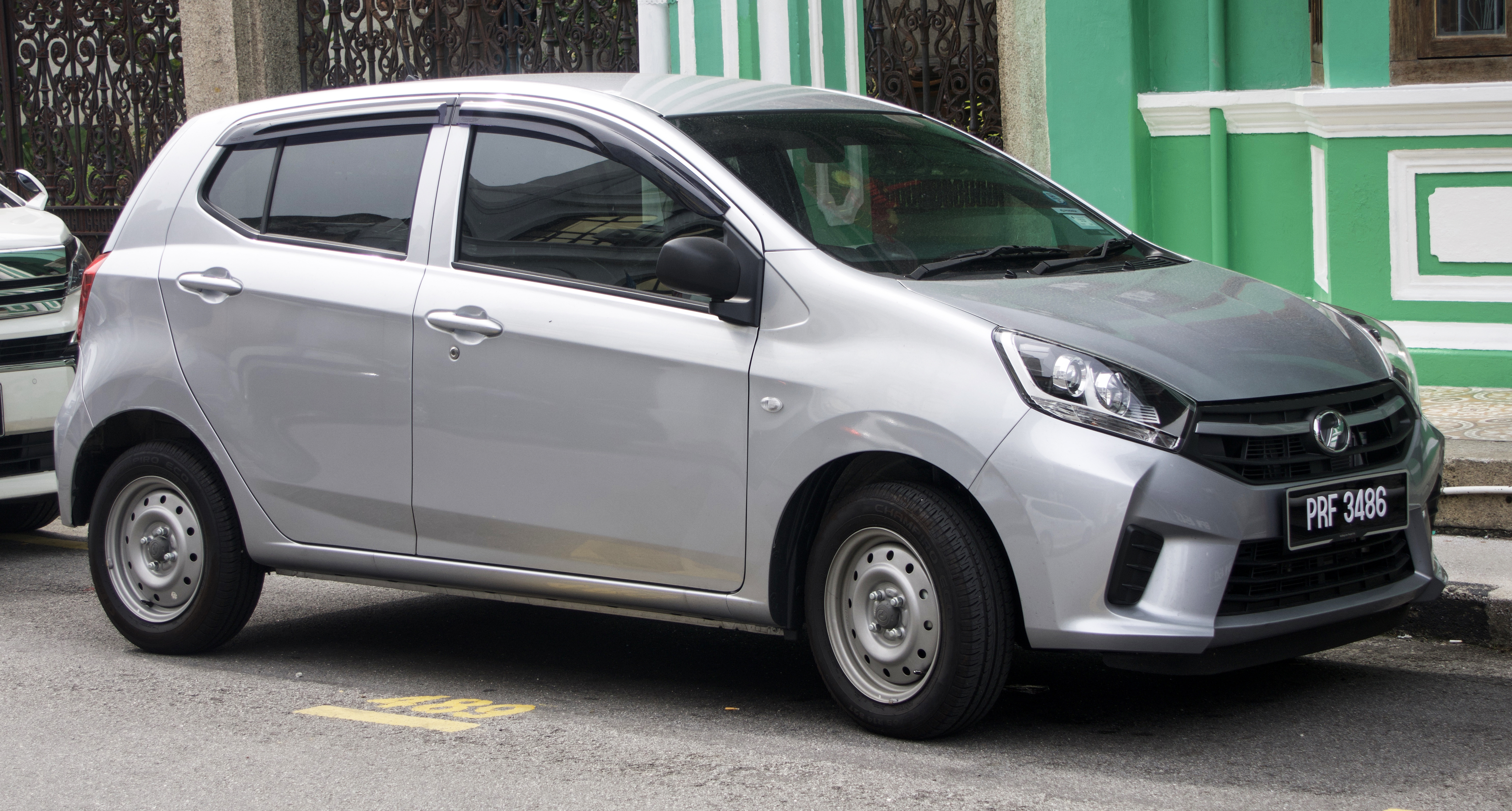
Front (E)

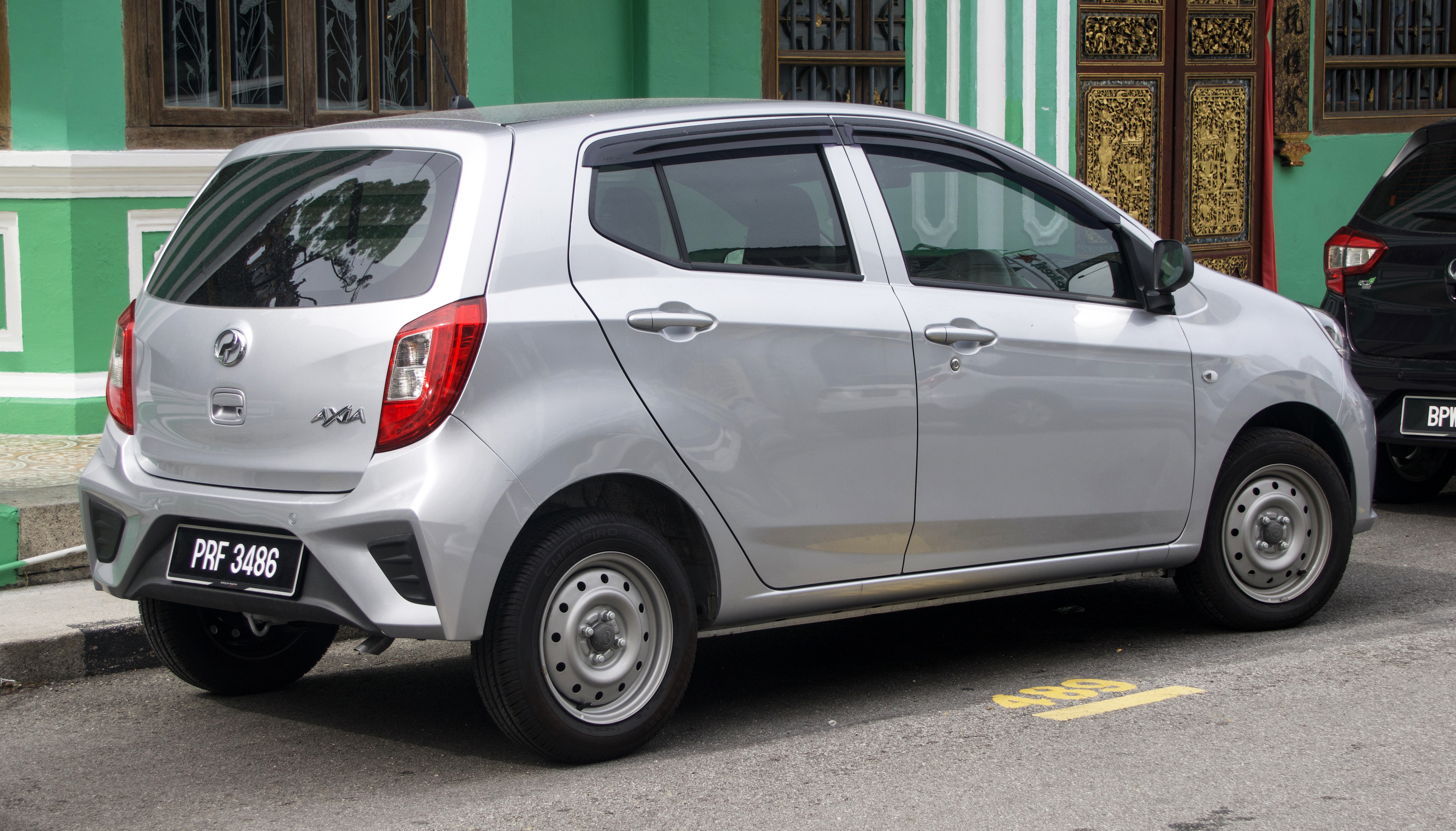
Rear (E)

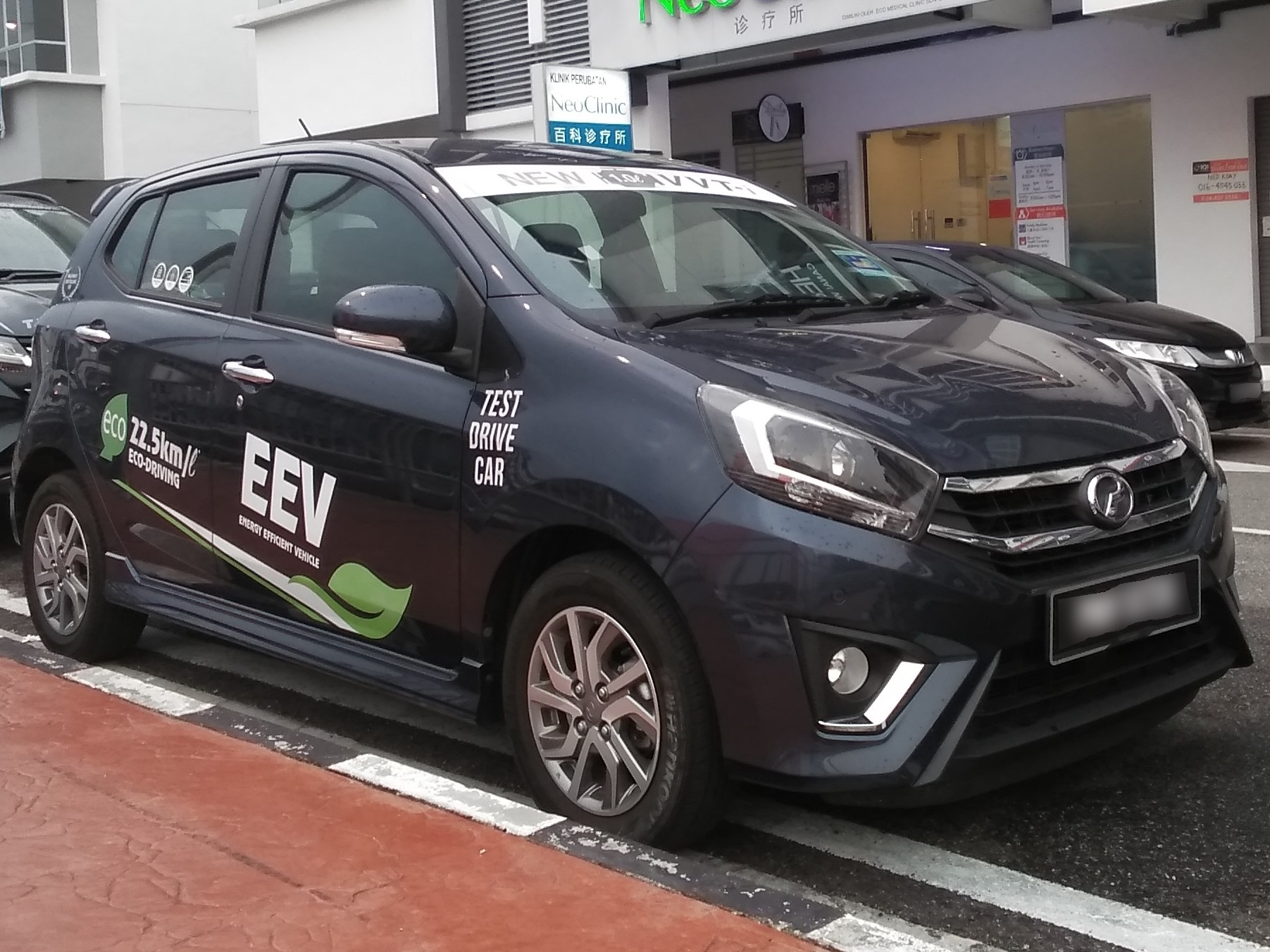
Front (Advance)

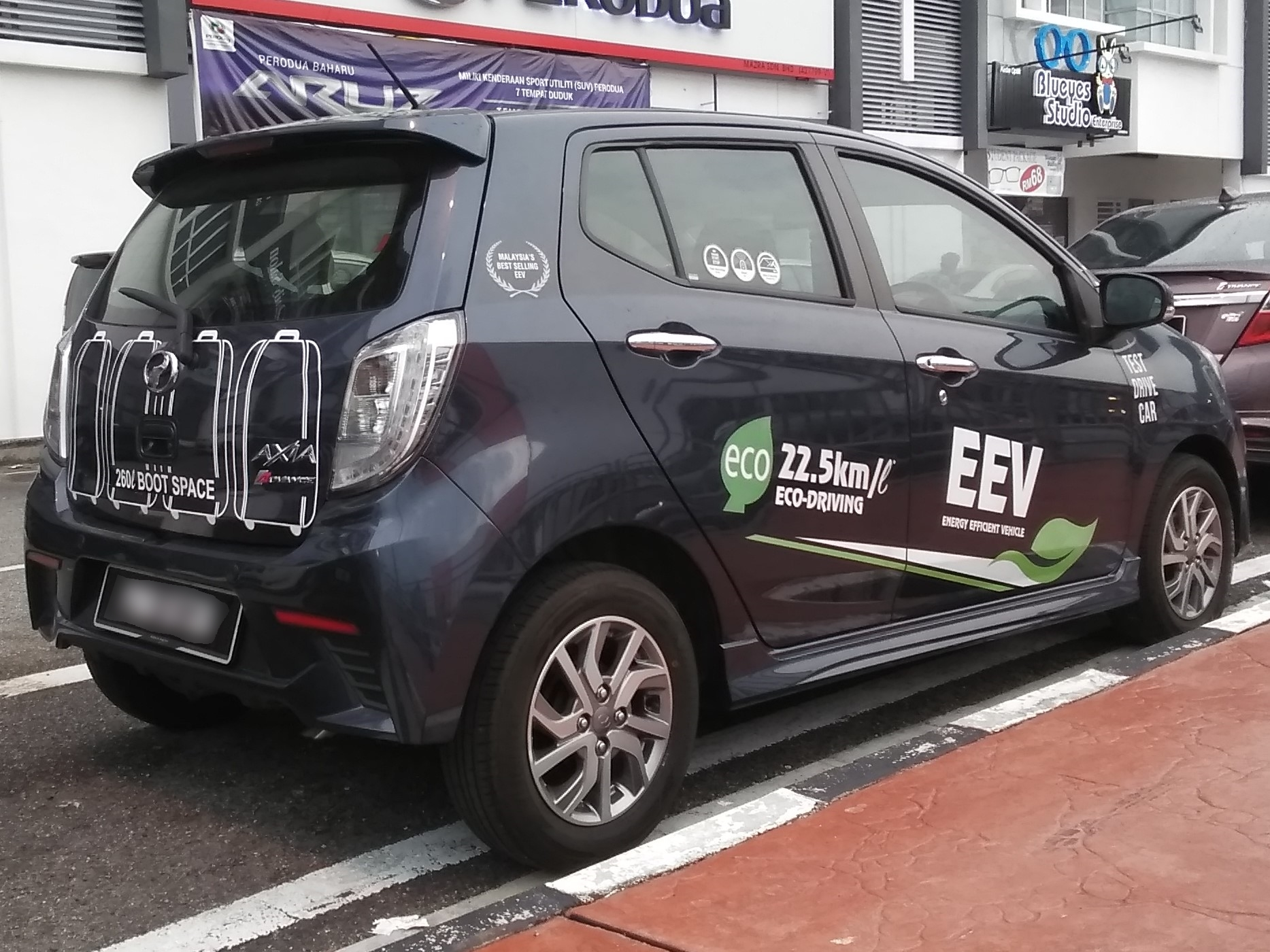
Rear (Advance)

==== 2019 second facelift styling ====
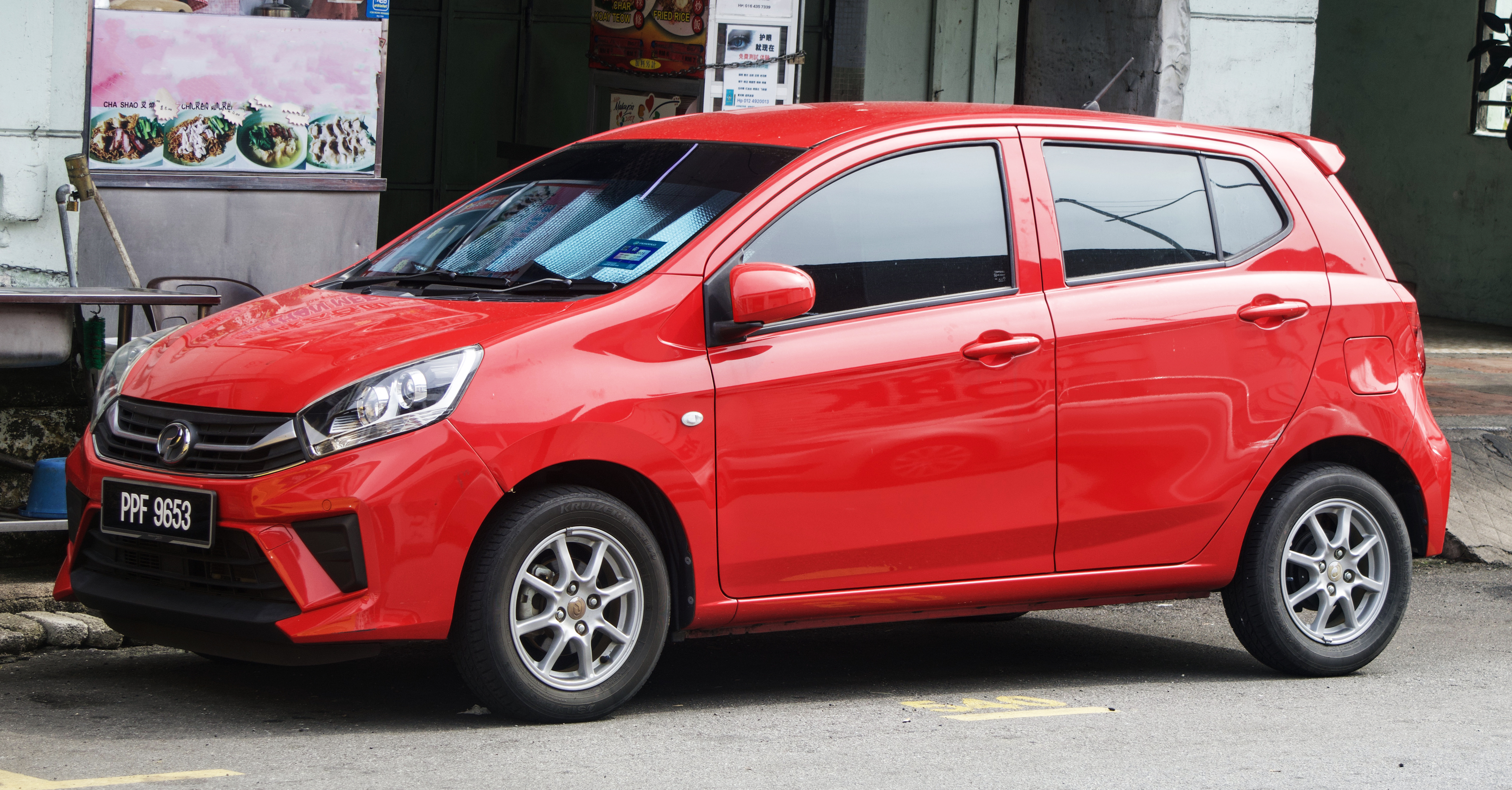
2020 Perodua Axia GXtra

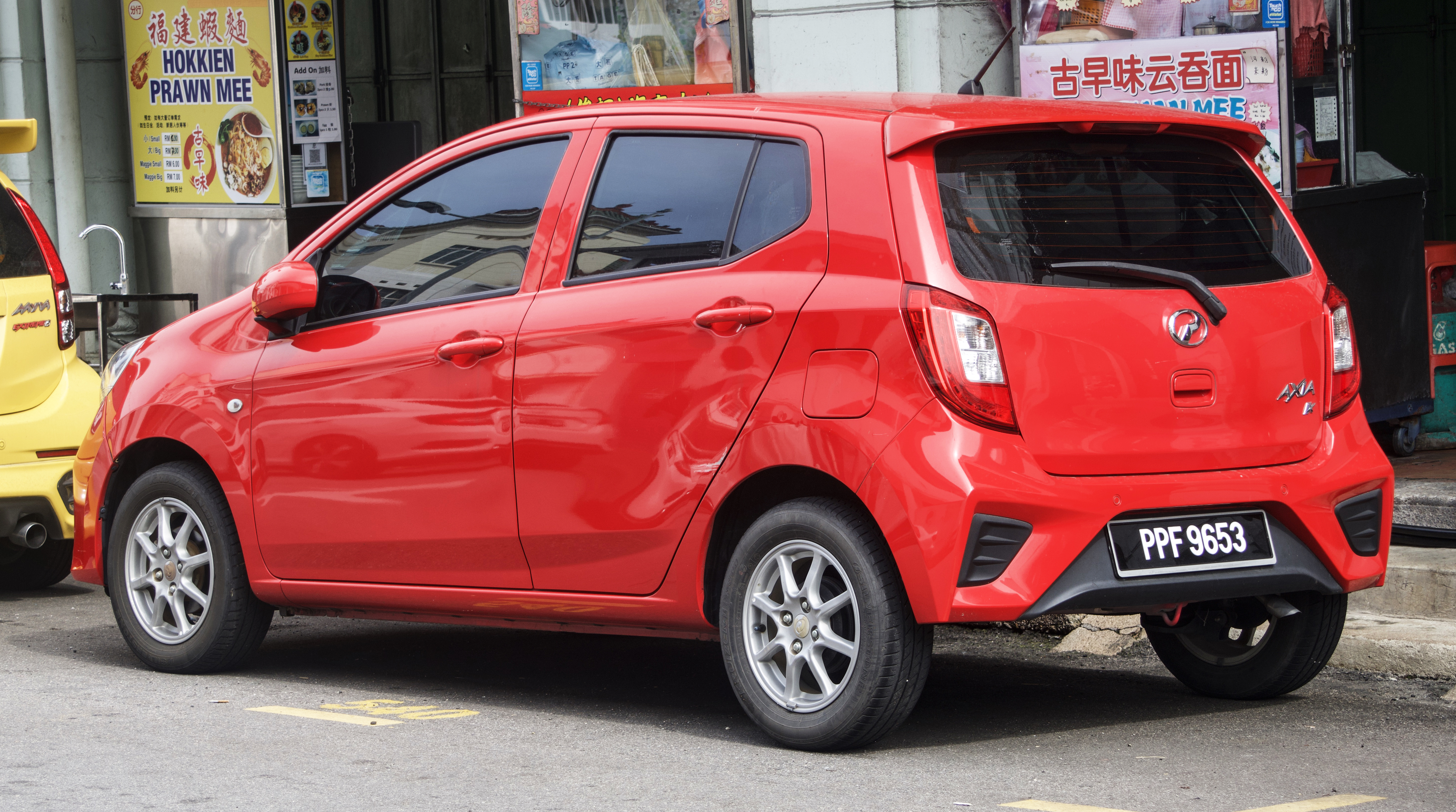
Rear view (GXtra)

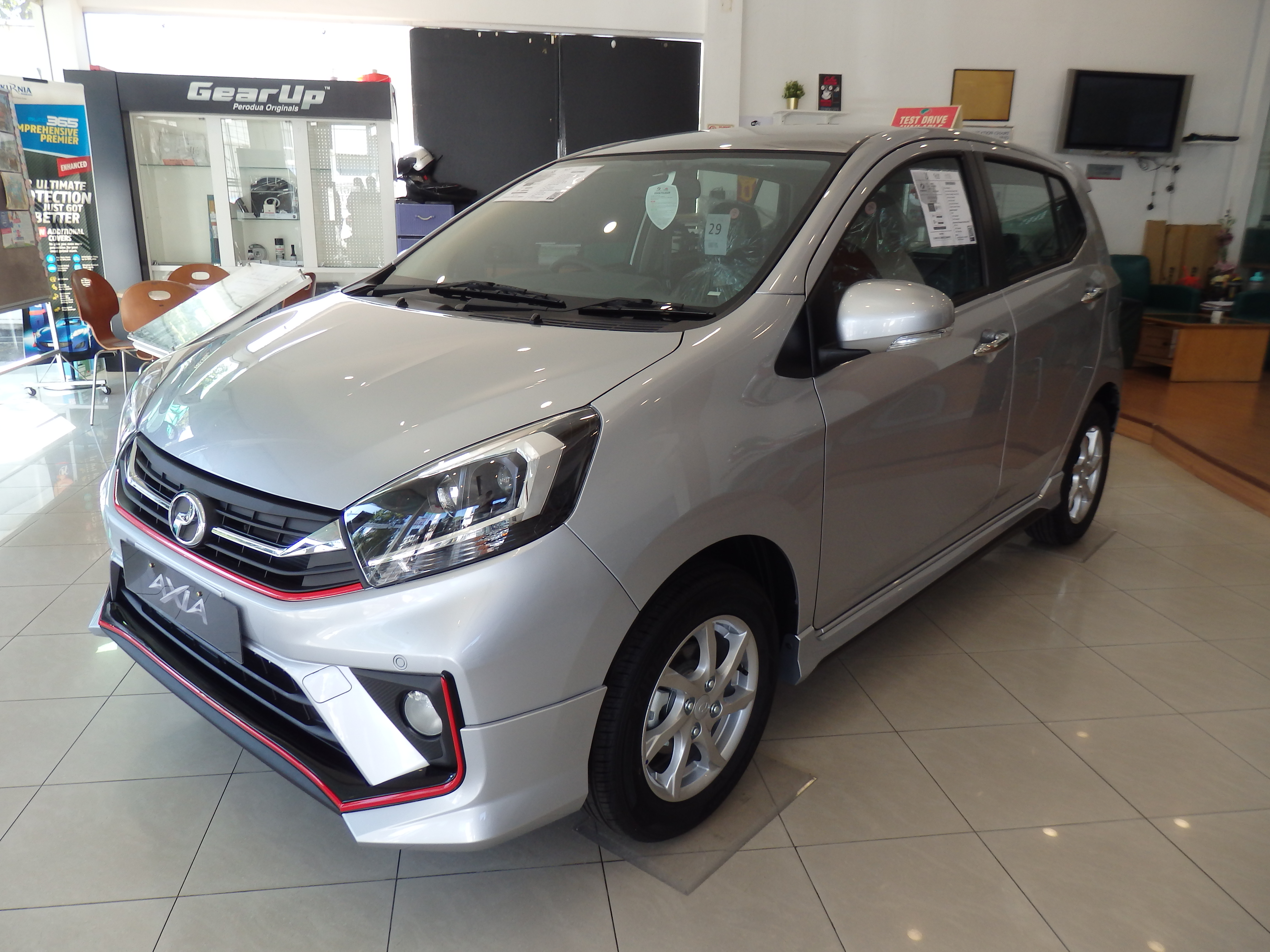
Front (SE)

==== Axia Style ====
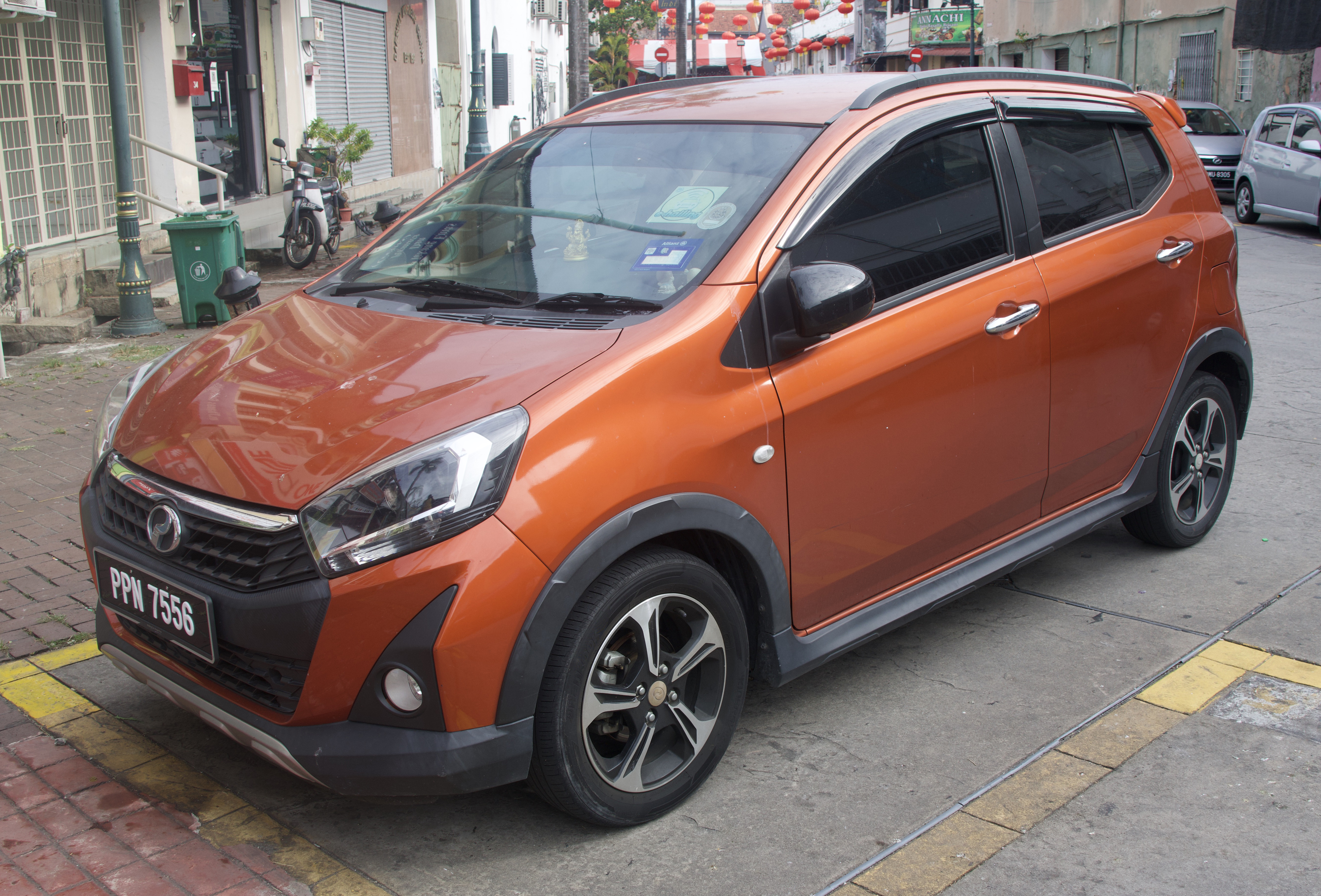
Front

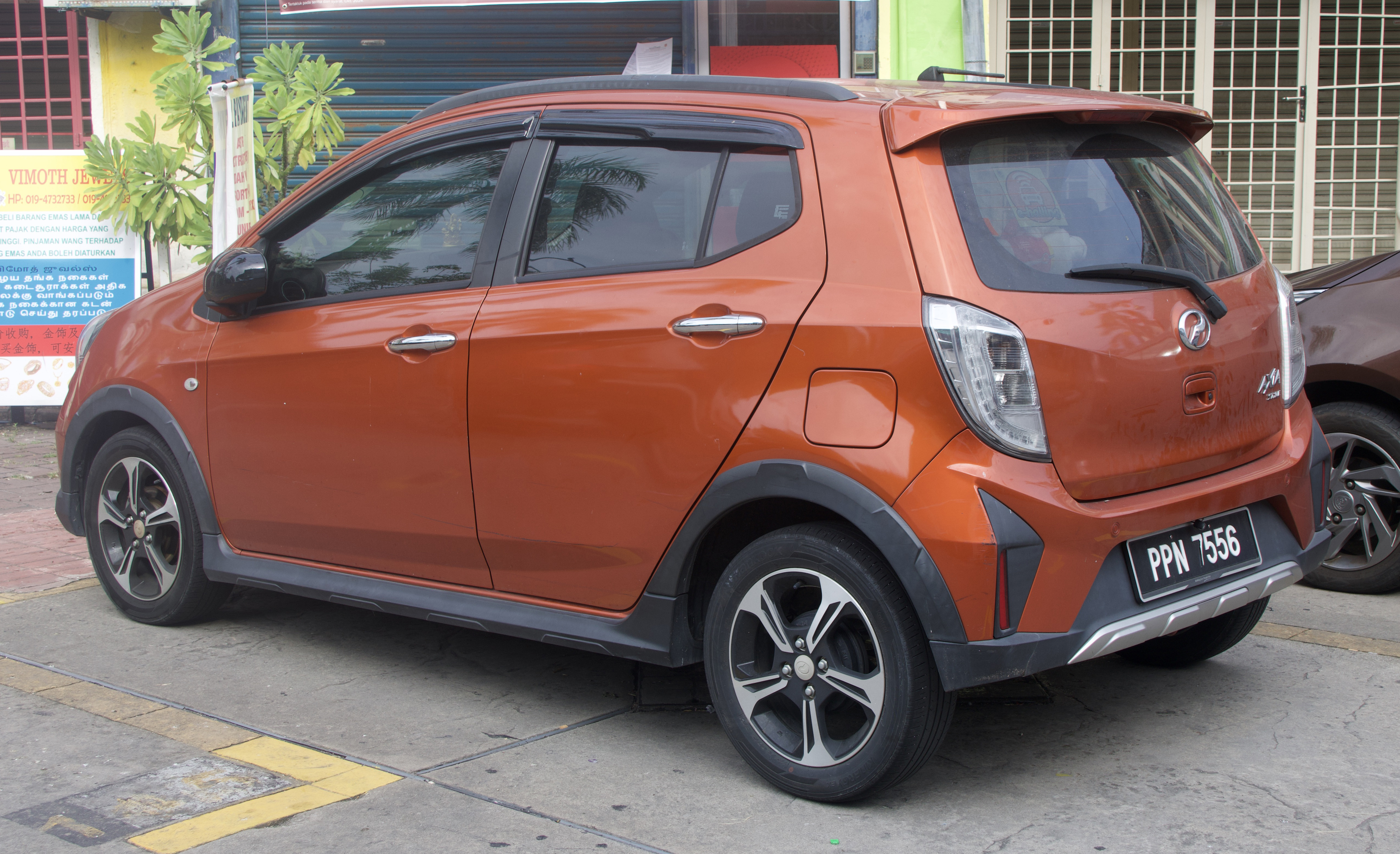
Rear

=== Safety ===
In a 2014 testing under 2012–2016 ASEAN NCAP standards, the first-generation Axia received a 4-star rating.

ASEAN NCAP test results Perodua Axia (2014)
Test	Points	Stars
Adult occupant:	12.91	4 /5 stars
Child occupant:	71%	4 /5 stars
Safety assist:	NA	

At launch, anti-lock braking system (ABS) with electronic brakeforce distribution (EBD) and Brake assist (BA) were equipped on the SE and Advance variant while the more affordable Standard E and Standard G variant were not equipped with the aforementioned features. The Axia is equipped with 2 airbags for all variants.

For 2016, the Standard G variant gained ABS with EBD and BA.

In September 2019, all models of the refreshed Axia except the Standard E and Standard G variant now gets vehicle stability control. Airbag count remains at 2 across the board. The range-topping Advance variant now features the Advanced Safety Assist 2.0 (ASA 2.0) which debuted in the Perodua Aruz, which includes Forward Collision Warning with pedestrian detection, Automatic Emergency Braking (operative from speeds of 4–80 km/h), Pedal Misoperation Control and Front Departure Alert, which alerts the driver of the vehicle in front has proceeded ahead, e.g. from a traffic light.

=== Powertrains ===
The pre-facelift Perodua Axia was offered with one petrol engine, the 998cc 12-valve DOHC 1KR-DE2 I3, sourced from Toyota and Daihatsu but redesigned by Perodua. The new 1.0 litre engine offers 66 hp (49 kW) at 6,000 rpm and 90 Nm (66 lb ft) of torque at 3,600 rpm. It is Perodua's first engine to be made with aluminium parts, which are lighter than their cast iron equivalents and it is the first to use drive by wire technology. As a result, the new 1KR-DE2 engine weighs 69 kg, or 10 kg less than the old 989cc EJ-VE engine in the Perodua Viva. Unlike the 1KR-FE engine, The 1KR-DE2 in the Axia is not equipped with Toyota's Variable Valve Timing with intelligence (VVT-i) technology. The new engine is also Euro IV compliant.

The 1KR-DE2 1.0L engine in the Axia is paired to a choice of two transmissions, a five-speed manual and a four-speed automatic respectively. Perodua claims that the Axia is capable of achieving up to 21.6 km/L with the manual, and 20.1 km/L with the automatic while in ‘ECO Mode’. All Axias will come equipped with an Electric Power Steering (EPS) system for greater ease of steering, in addition to improved fuel-efficiency.

The Perodua Axia became the first car to qualify under Malaysia's 2014 National Automotive Policy (NAP) Energy Efficient Vehicle (EEV) fuel-efficiency standards on its late 2014 launch.

The facelift versions of the Perodua Axia gained Toyota's Variable Valve Timing with intelligence (VVT-i) in the form of the 1KR-VE engine.

== Second generation (A300; 2023) ==
Second generation
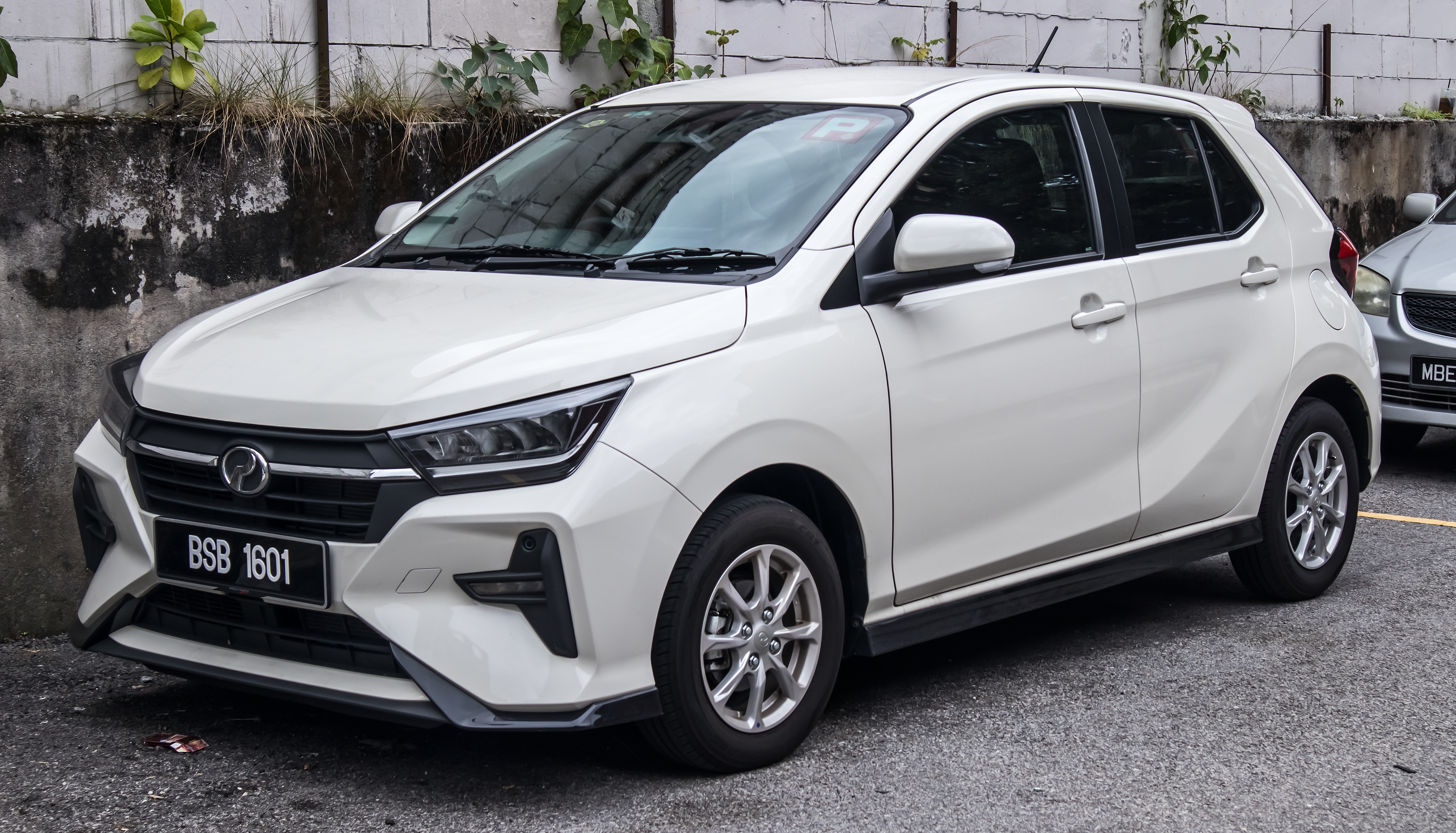
- 2025 Perodua Axia AV

Overview
- Model code: A300
- Also called: Toyota Agya; Toyota Wigo
- Production: January 2023 – present

Body and chassis
- Platform: Daihatsu New Global Architecture: DNGA-A
- Related: Daihatsu Rocky (A200)

Powertrain
- Engine: Petrol: 1.0 L 1KR-VE I3
- Power output: 50 kW (67 hp; 68 ps)
- Transmission: D-CVT

Dimensions
- Wheelbase: 2,525 mm (99.4 in)
- Length: 3,760 mm (148.0 in)
- Width: 1,665 mm (65.6 in)
- Height: 1,505 mm (59.3 in)
- Kerb weight: 865–890 kg (1,907–1,962 lb)

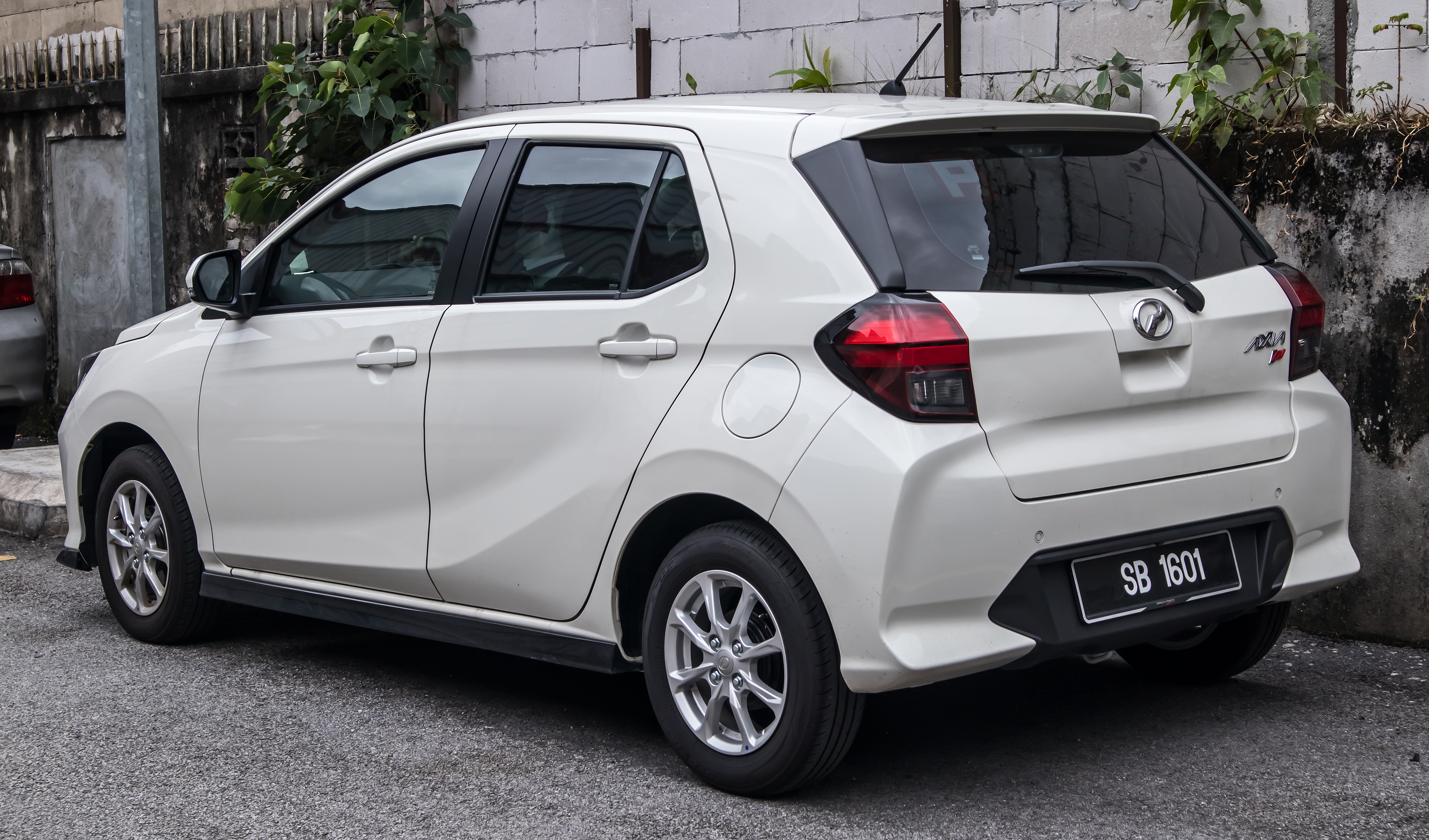
Rear view

The second generation Axia was launched on 14 February 2023. Vehicles with camouflage stickers are shown to the media on 8 February 2023, while in the same day Perodua released teaser images.

The second generation Axia is based on the Daihatsu New Global Architecture (DNGA). It is powered by a carryover 1.0-litre VVT-i engine, now equipped with Eco Idle auto start-stop technology. The previous 4-speed automatic transmission has been replaced by a brand new Dual-Mode CVT (D-CVT) developed by Daihatsu. The new Axia no longer has a 5-speed manual transmission as an option like before, with all models being automatic only. 4 grade levels are available on offer at launch – G, X, SE and AV. Advanced driver-assistance systems branded as Perodua Smart Drive Assist (PSDA) is also available, albeit only limited to the range-topping AV variant.

The development of the vehicle commenced in October 2019 with a total cost of RM546 million and 300,000 man-hours invested into the project. Daihatsu provided support throughout the process. Before its launch, Perodua targeted sales of 5,700 units per month.

The second generation Axia has been launched in Brunei on 3 May 2024 and the car were offered in G and AV variants.

=== Safety ===
In a testing conducted in January 2023, the second generation Axia received four stars in ASEAN NCAP crash testing.

Advanced Safety Assist or (A.S.A.) includes:

- PCW (Pre-Collision Warning)
- PCB (Pre-Collision Braking)
- PMC (Pedal Misoperation Control)
- FDA (Front Departure Alert)

ASEAN NCAP test results Perodua Axia (2023)
Test	Points
Overall:	4 /5 stars
Adult occupant:	32.06
Child occupant:	17.03
Safety assist:	15.71
Motorcyclist Safety:	8.75

=== Side collision test manipulation ===
On 28 April 2023, Daihatsu confirmed that the company had committed "wrongdoings" in approval application for side collision tests under UN-R95 requirements for four vehicles, including the A300 series Perodua Axia which was developed by the company. According to Daihatsu, the inside lining of the front seat door was improperly modified with a "notch" to prevent the part from breaking into pieces with sharp edges that could injure occupants during a side airbag deployment. These modifications are not present in production vehicles. 11,834 units of the model that has been delivered in Malaysia are affected. In response, Perodua suspended deliveries until the vehicles are re-tested.

== Sales ==
Year	Malaysia (Note: Figures based on registration)
2014	29,070
2015	99,722
2016	85,895
2017	67,463
2018	70,819
2019	67,267
2020	59,651
2021	43,081
2022	59,763
2023	75,256
2024	88,137
2025	84,291

== Awards and accolades ==
- Winner Compact Car of The Year - DSF.my Allianz VOTY (Vehicle of the Year) 2017
- Winner Value-for-Money Car of The Year - Frost & Sullivan
- Most Favourite Brand 2016/17 Automotive Sedan/Compact Cars - The Brand Laureate

== See also ==
- Daihatsu Ayla / Toyota Agya, the models that the Perodua Axia is based on.
- Perodua Bezza, a sedan car based on Axia platform.
