= Perodua Bezza =

Malaysian B-segment sedan

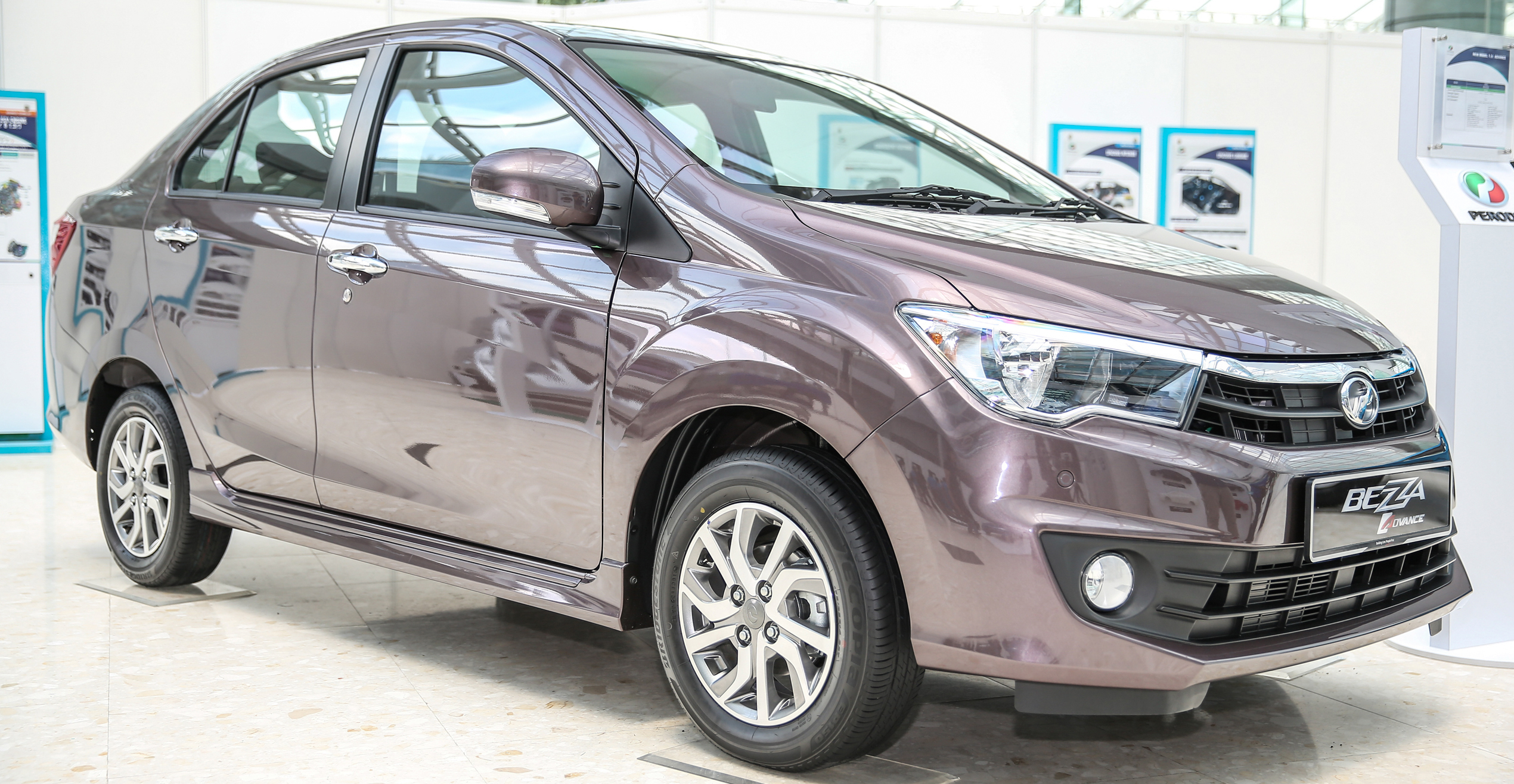
- Perodua Bezza Advance

Overview
- Manufacturer: Perodua
- Model code: B300
- Production: July 2016 – present July 2016 – September 2026 (1.0 G)
- Assembly: Malaysia: Serendah (PGMSB)
- Designer: Muhamad Zamuren Musa

Body and chassis
- Class: City car (A)
- Body style: 4-door sedan
- Layout: Front-engine, front-wheel drive
- Platform: Daihatsu A-Segment Platform
- Related: Perodua Axia; Daihatsu Ayla; Toyota Agya; Toyota Wigo; Daihatsu Sigra

Powertrain
- Engine: Petrol: 1.0 L 1KR-VE I3; 1.3 L 1NR-VE I4
- Transmission: 5-speed manual; 4-speed automatic

Dimensions
- Wheelbase: 2,455 mm (96.7 in)
- Length: 4,170 mm (164.2 in)
- Width: 1,620 mm (63.8 in)
- Height: 1,525 mm (60.0 in)
- Kerb weight: 865–940 kg (1,907–2,072 lb)

The Perodua Bezza is a city car produced by Malaysian automobile manufacturer Perodua. It was launched on 21 July 2016 as Perodua's first sedan, and a complement to the Axia hatchback.

The Bezza is based on the Axia's platform, and is powered by the latter's 1.0-litre engine, in addition to a new 1.3-litre plant. The Bezza is Perodua's first major in-house design. Perodua leads the styling and development of the Bezza's upper body structure, with technical support from Daihatsu. The Bezza is the second model to debut from Perodua's all-new factory in Serendah, Selangor.

The Perodua Bezza was developed with an emphasis on fuel efficiency, and is the company's first model to feature stop-start idling and regenerative braking. The Bezza is also the first Perodua to feature Vehicle Stability Control (VSC). The range-topping Bezza Advance scored a 5-star ASEAN NCAP rating.

== Etymology ==
The name "Bezza" is derived from the Malay word beza, which means "different". Additionally, the letters "zz" in "Bezza" represents the number 22, as it was launched in Perodua's 22nd year in business. The Bezza logo was also designed to make both z's look like one z only.

== History ==
=== Pre-launch ===
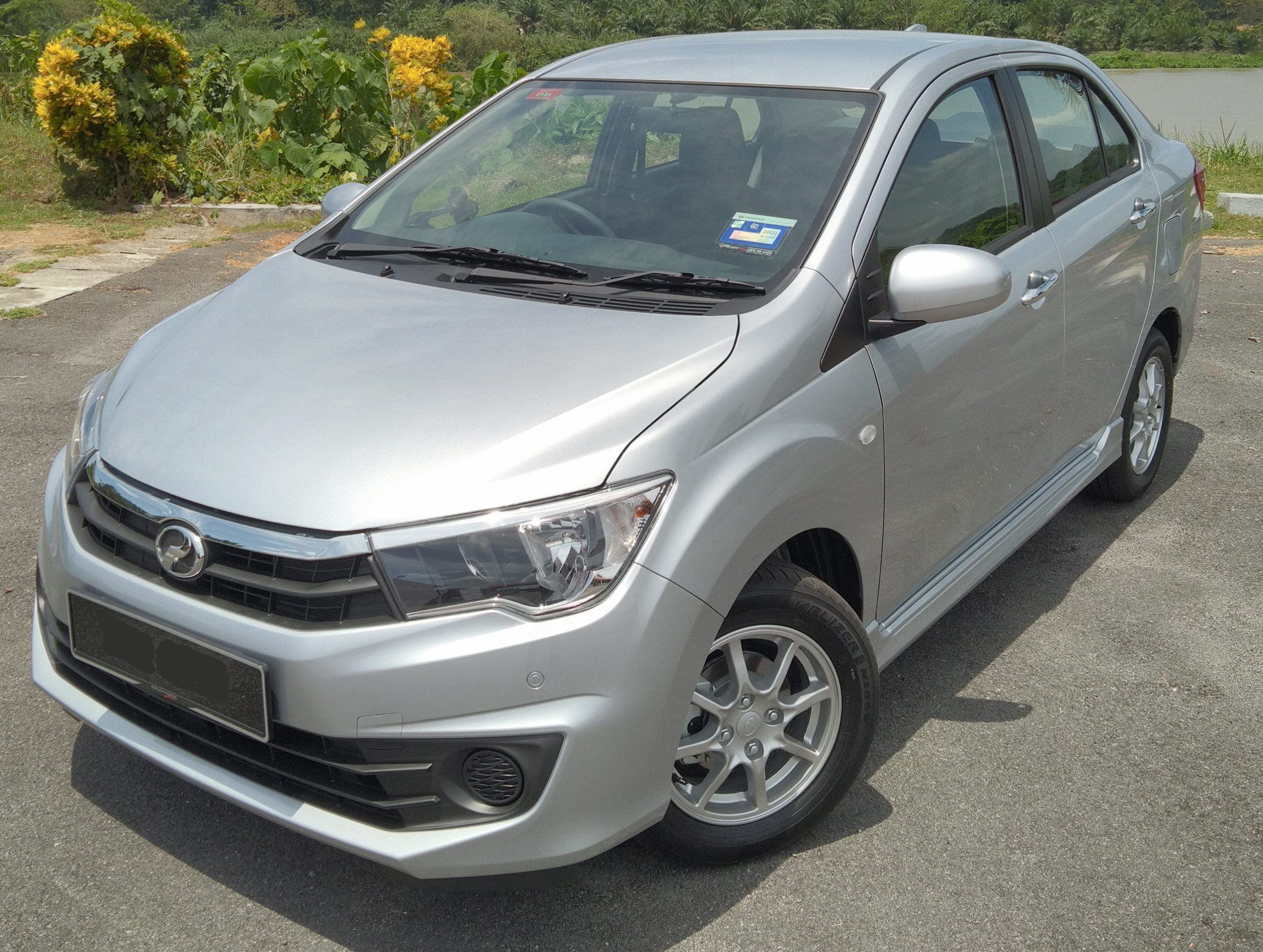

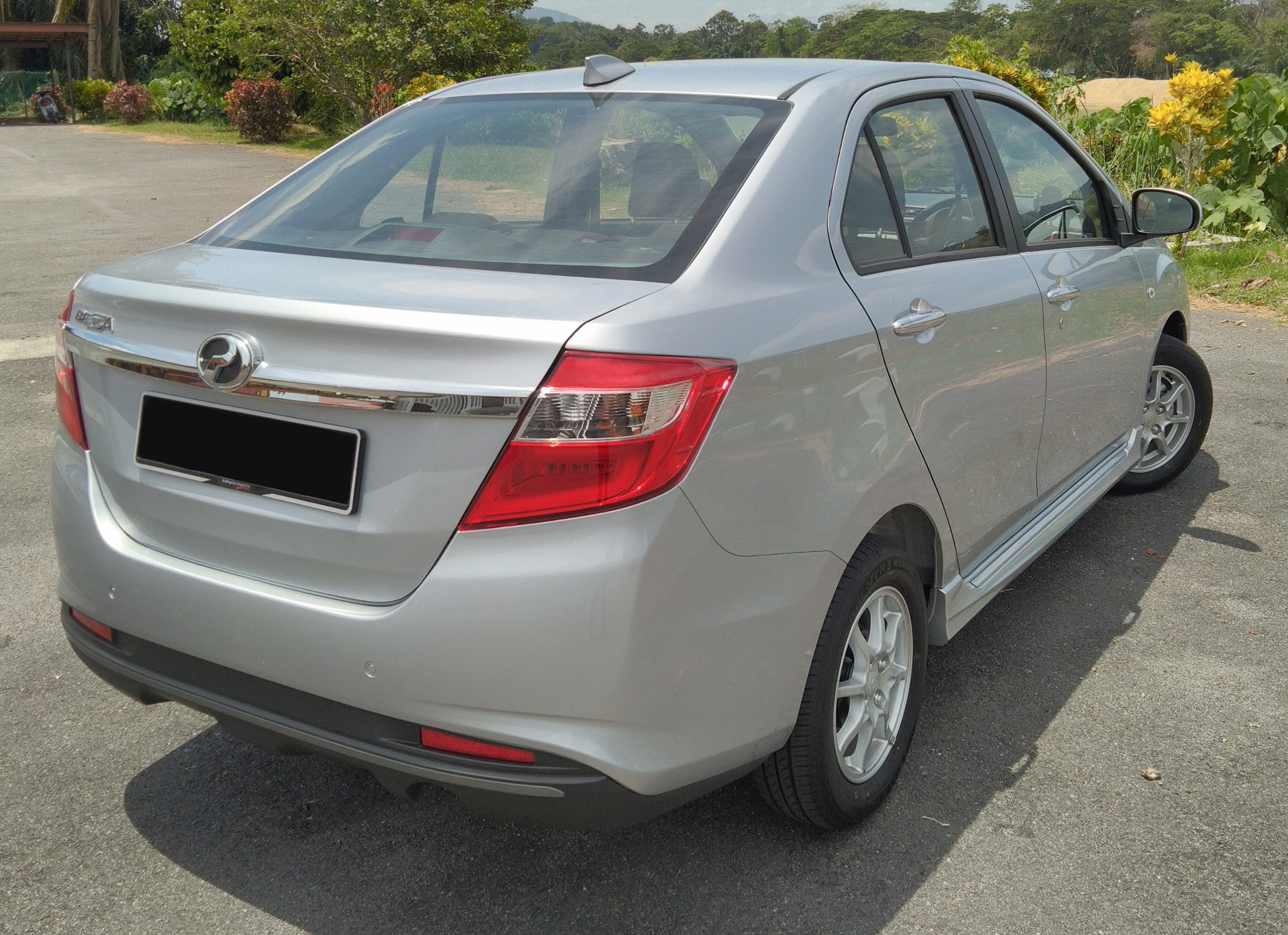
Pre-facelift (G variant)

Developed under the codename D63D, The production of Perodua's first sedan was first hinted during the 2010 Kuala Lumpur International Motor Show (KLIMS), when Perodua debuted their concept model called Bezza. Three years later, another concept model was presented by Perodua during the 2013 KLIMS; this time, it was called Buddyz. Both concept models were designed in-house by Perodua's own design and styling division led by Muhamad Zamuren Musa, without referring to any existing Daihatsu or Toyota car models, referring instead to the Chevrolet Aveo. The production of Perodua's first sedan was approved in 2015 by its chief executive officer, Datuk Aminar Rashid. The production model would draw inspiration from the Buddyz concept model and was codenamed D63D.

The Bezza is the first Perodua model that isn't directly based on any pre-existing Toyota or Daihatsu model. Perodua lead the styling and development of the Bezza's upper body structure, with technical support from Daihatsu. Perodua claims that the Bezza has up to 95% local content, and was developed at a cost of RM 300 million. However, Perodua did not develop the Bezza from scratch, as it is powered by Toyota-engineered engines and is based on the Daihatsu-engineered Axia platform. Unlike their rival Proton, Perodua was able to develop their first sedan model secretly without public knowledge. The Perodua Bezza competes with the Proton Saga in its home market.

=== Launch ===
The Perodua Bezza was launched on 21 July 2016. Three variants were available at launch: Standard G, Premium X and Advance.

In the beginning of April 2017, the Perodua Bezza was updated with the rear bumper given a deeper skirt for all the variants. The Premium X and Advance variant got chrome platinum trim on the air-conditioning controls and the Advance variant also gains new leather upholstery that does without the previous quilting.

In April 2018, the Standard G was replaced by a GXtra variant. The GXtra comes with an enhanced kit list, where side skirts and chrome door handles have been added to the exterior. There’s also a new Ocean Blue exterior colour available – an option that was previously reserved for 1.3L variants of the Bezza. Piano black trim has been applied on the dashboard and panel surrounding the multimedia system, which itself has been improved with Bluetooth connectivity. In other areas, the air-con vent surrounds, steering wheel spokes and gear lever base now gain a satin finish. Rounding things off are chrome door handles to mimic those on the outside.

On 11 April 2019, a Limited Edition Bezza limited to 50 units was launched. The variant was based on the Premium X and solely with an automatic transmission. Changes compared to the Premium X variant included every GearUp accessory as well as different finishes to various components.

=== Facelift ===
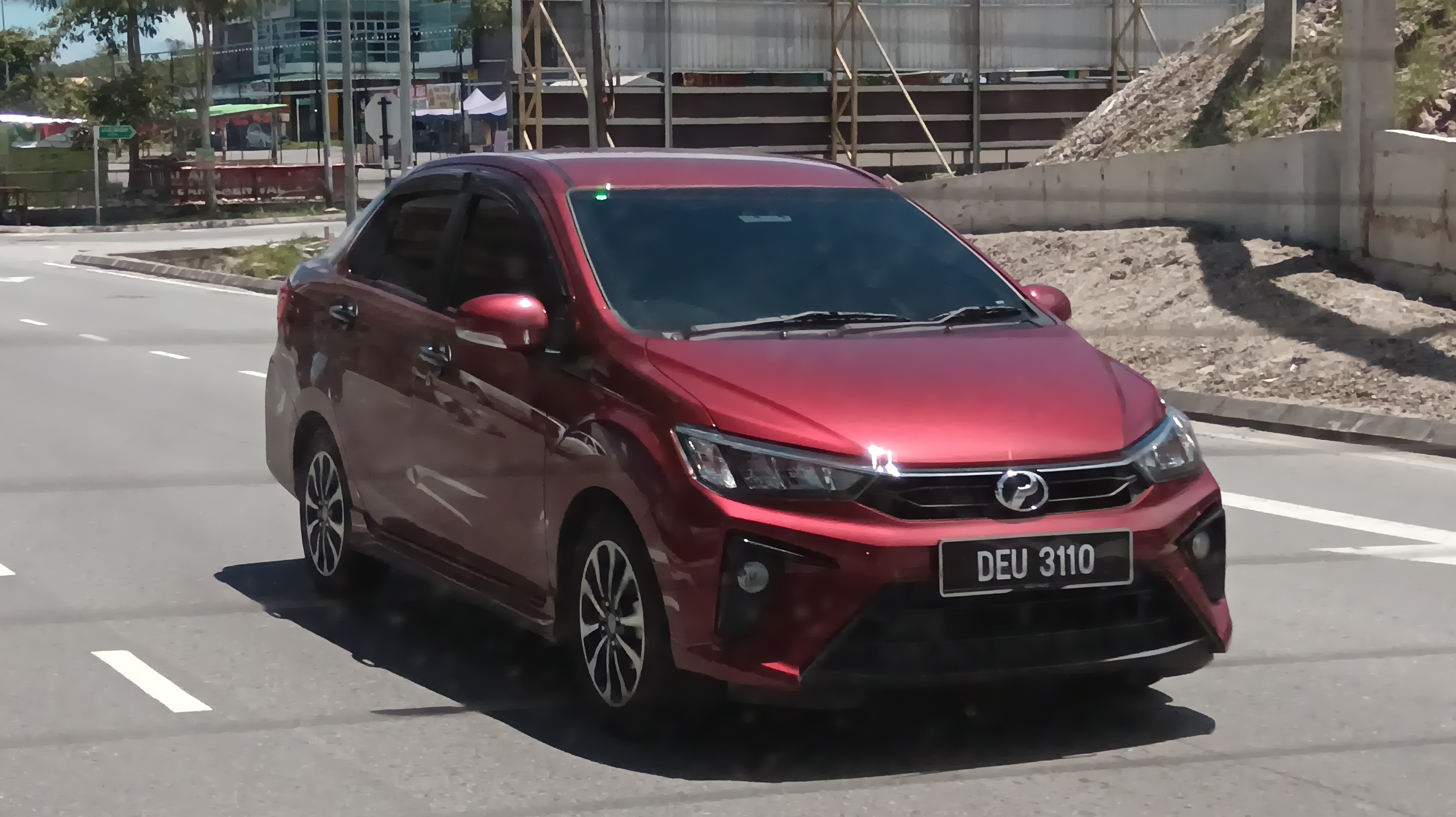

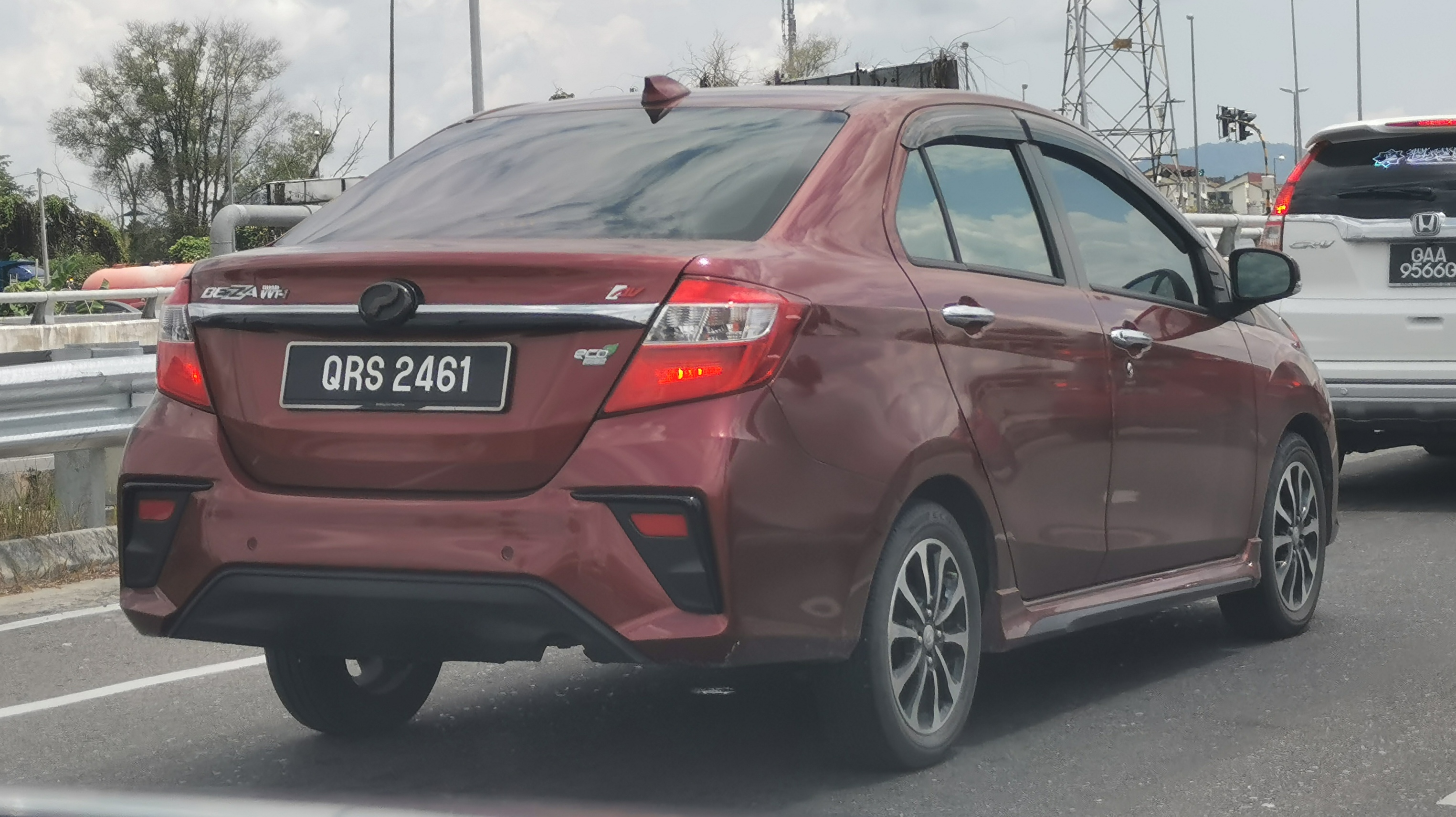
Facelift (AV variant)

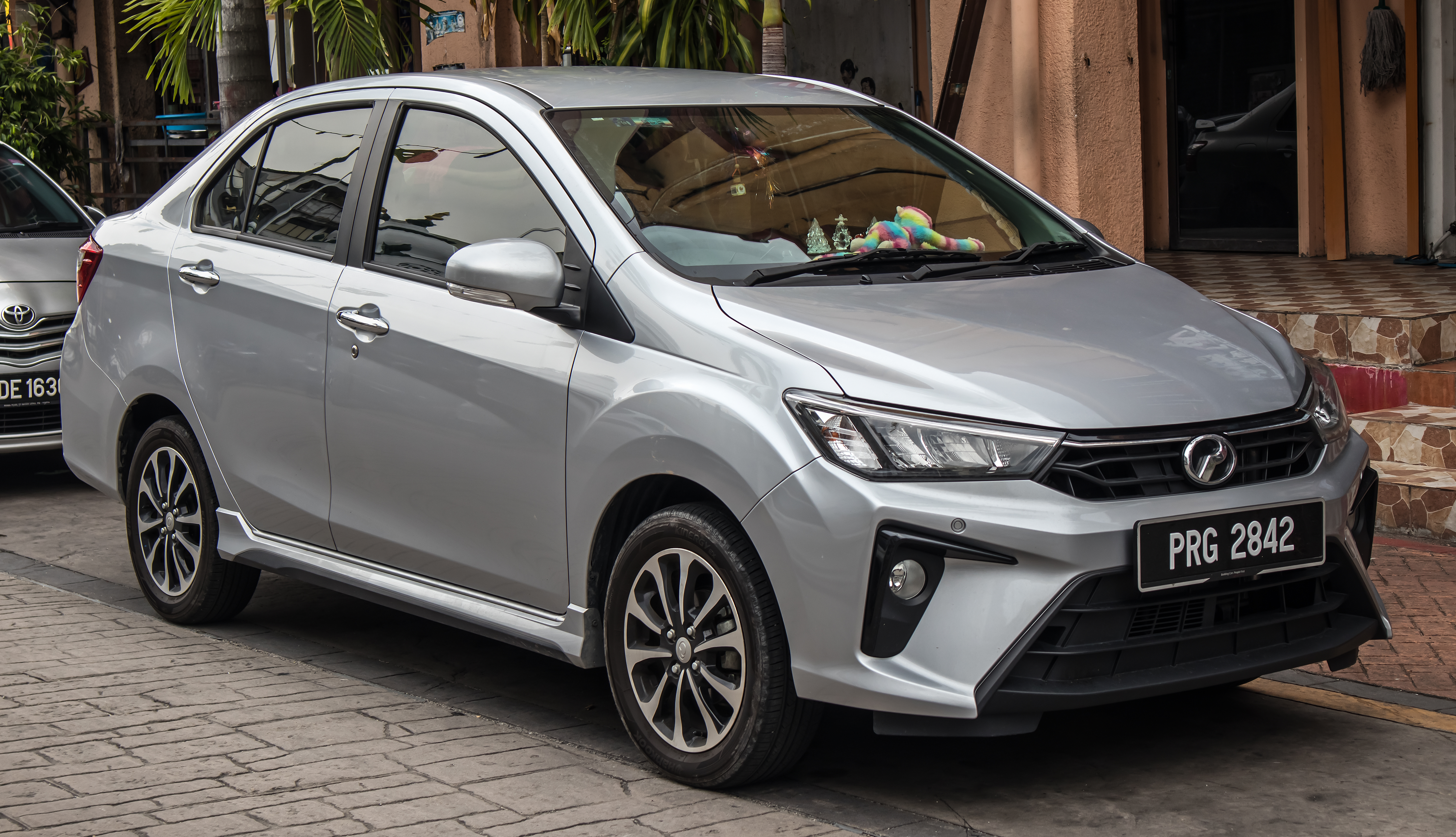

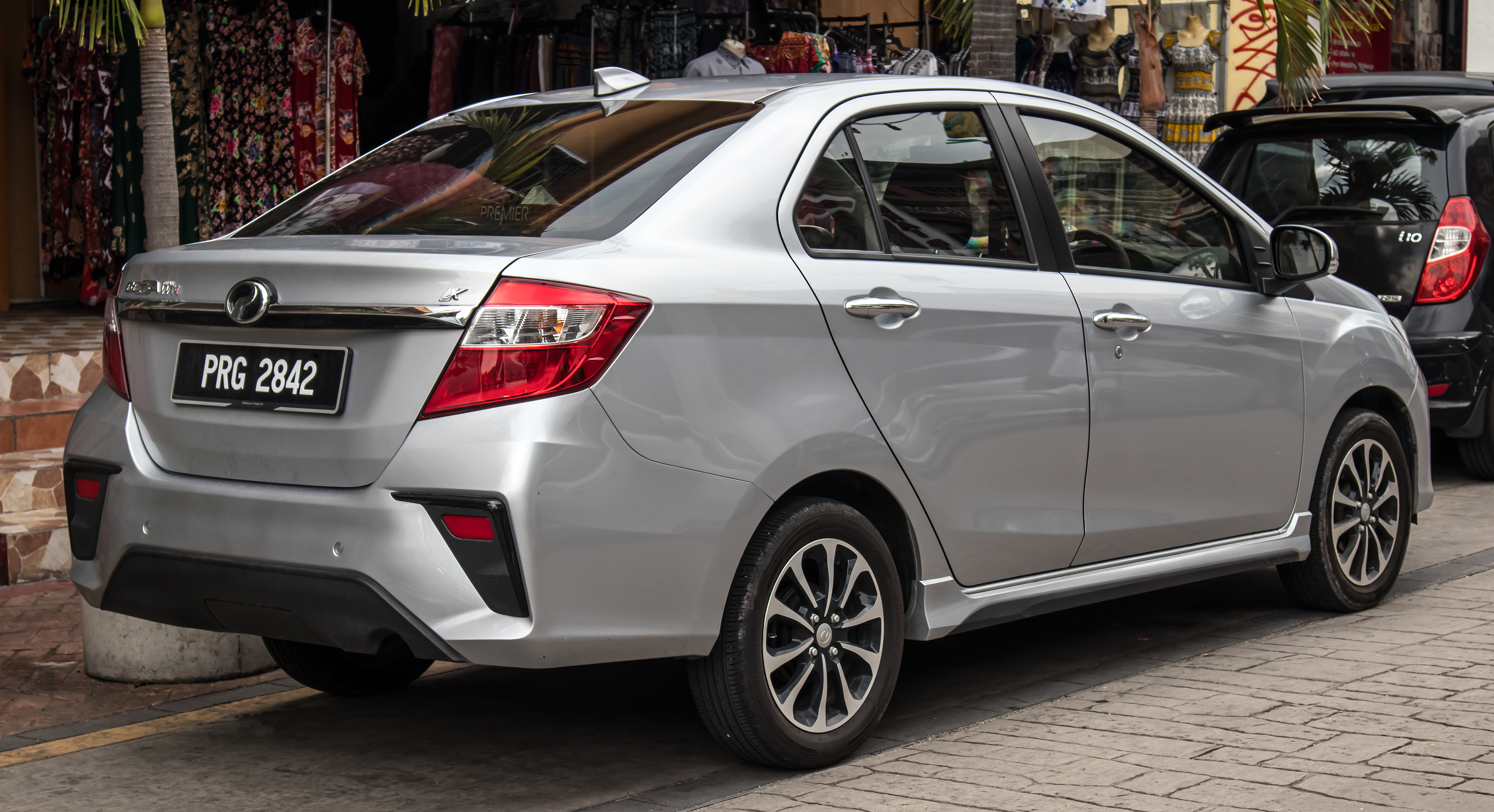
Facelift (X variant)

In early January 2020, the facelift version was launched in Malaysia which brought changes to the Bezza both inside and out with the variants 1.0 G Manual, 1.0 G Automatic, 1.3 X Automatic and 1.3 AV Automatic has remained. The new Bezza now has a redesigned front and rear bumpers and upgraded LED headlamps for all variants. The rear chrome strip and side skirts now have a gloss black finish. Wheels now are 14-inch turbine design rims (1.0L variants) or 15-inch double-tone alloys (1.3L variants). It also gets 2 new colour - Garnet Red and Granite Grey - to join the previous 4 colours. Variants now come in 1.0 G Manual, 1.0 G Automatic, 1.3 X and 1.3 AV

The Bezza now comes with an updated speedometer with white illumination. The gloss black bar that cuts through the dashboard in the pre-facelift model has been removed for a silver trim.

The new Bezza AV now also comes with a reverse camera and Advanced Safety Assist 2.0 (ASA 2.0), which includes Pedestrian Detection, Pre-Collision Warning, Pre-Collision Braking, Front Departure Alert and Pedal Misoperation Control. Each variant comes with rear bumper sensors, Anti-Lock Braking System (ABS) and Electronic Brakeforce Distribution (EBC) as standard, while the 1.3L variants get additional Vehicle Stability Control (VSC), Keyless Entry and Push Start and front bumper sensors.

== Equipment ==
The Standard G variant is equipped with 14-inch seven-spoke alloy rims, fabric seats, polyurethane steering wheel, an audio system with USB, handphone or smartphone slot at the rear console, fixed rear seat headrests, 60:40 split folding rear seats, remote boot release, manual side mirrors without turn signals, body-mounted signal indicators, and power windows.

=== Exterior ===
Equipment	1.0 G Manual	1.0 G Automatic	1.3 X	1.3 AV
Wheels	14-inch Alloy Wheels	14-inch Alloy Wheels	15-inch Alloy Wheels(Two Tone)	15-inch Alloy Wheels (Two Tone)
Front & Rear Bumper	Body Coloured	Body Coloured	Body Coloured	Body Coloured
Front Grille	Glossy Black & Silver Finish	Glossy Black & Silver Finish	Glossy Black & Chrome Finish	Glossy Black & Chrome Finish
Led Headlamps	Yes	Yes	Yes	Yes
Front Fog Lamps	No	No	Yes	Yes
Electric Side Mirrors with Turn Signals	Yes	Yes	Yes	Yes (Retractable)
Two-tone Back Door Garnish	Yes	Yes	Yes	Yes
Door Handles	Chrome Finish	Chrome Finish	Chrome Finish	Chrome Finish
Front Corner Sensors	No	No	Yes	Yes
Reverse Sensors	Yes	Yes	Yes	Yes
Reverse Camera	No	No	No	Yes
Rear Combination Lamps	LED (light guide & stop lamp)	LED (light guide & stop lamp)	LED (light guide & stop lamp)	LED (light guide & stop lamp)
Blacked-out pillar	No	No	Yes	Yes

=== Interior ===
Equipment	1.0 G Manual	1.0 G Automatic	1.3 X	1.3 AV
Seats	Fabric	Fabric	Fabric	Leather
Power Windows	Yes (Driver Side)	Yes (Driver Side)	Yes (With Jam Protection on Driver Side)	Yes (With Jam Protection on Driver Side)
Smart Entry & Push Start/Stop Button	No	No	Yes	Yes
Electric Power Steering	Yes	Yes	Yes	Yes
Auto-off Headlamps	Yes	Yes	Yes	Yes
ISOFIX System	Yes	Yes	Yes	Yes
Multi-purpose Container	Yes	Yes	Yes	Yes
Audio System	Yes (With USB & Bluetooth)	Yes (With USB & Bluetooth)	Yes (With USB & Bluetooth)	Yes (Multimedia System with navigation & 'Smart Link', USB, Bluetooth & HDMI)
Multi-info Display	Yes	Yes	Yes	Yes (With 'Idle Stop' Indicator)
12V Power Socket	Yes	Yes	Yes	Yes
Driver Seat Height Adjuster	No	No	Yes	Yes
Advanced Safety Assist (A.S.A 2.0)	No	No	No	Yes

== Powertrains ==
The Perodua Bezza is produced with two different engine options, paired to a manual or electronic automatic transmission. Both engines are manufactured by Perodua under license from Toyota Group member, Daihatsu.

Specifications
Specification	1.0 G	1.3 X and AV
Engine Type	1KR-VE	1NR-VE
Format	I3 DOHC 12V	I4 DOHC 16V
Total displacement (cc)	998	1329
Compression Ratio	11.5:1	11.5:1
Bore x Stroke (mm x mm)	71.0 x 84.0	72.5 x 80.5
Maximum Output [hp(kW)/rpm]	67 (50) / 6,000 rpm	94 (70) / 6,000 rpm
Maximum Torque (Nm/rpm)	91 / 4,400 rpm	121 / 4,000 rpm
Variable Valve Timing With Intelligence (VVT-i)	Yes	Yes (Dual VVT-i)
Fuel tank capacity (litres)	36	36
Fuel Consumption (with Eco-Driving) (km/l)	1.0 G Manual: 22.8 1.0 G Automatic: 21.3	1.3 X: 21.0 1.3 AV(with Eco-Idle): 22.0
Top Speed (km/h)	172	198

The Standard G and GXtra variant is powered by Perodua's 1.0-litre, three-cylinder 1KR-VE engine, which is a modified and refined version of the 1KR-DE2 engine from the Perodua Axia. The 1KR-VE engine produces 67 hp at 6,000 rpm and 91 Nm at 4,400 rpm, offering a mild 1 hp and 1 Nm increase over the Axia's 1KR-DE2 plant. Perodua claims ECE fuel consumption figures of 22.8 km/L for the manual variant and 21.3 km/L with the automatic, both exhibiting a 1.2 km/L improvement over the old 1KR-DE2.

The 1KR-VE engine features variable-valve timing with intelligence (VVT-i) on the intake valves. Several minor changes and refinements were also introduced for increased fuel efficiency and more linear power delivery. Notable changes include a higher 11.5:1 compression ratio, a high-tumble intake port, a longer intake manifold, micro fuel spray injection and low-friction valve lifters.

The Premium X and Advance variants are powered by Perodua's 1.3-litre, four-cylinder 1NR-VE engine, which is capable of 94 hp at 6,000 rpm and 121 Nm at 4,000 rpm. The 1NR-VE is an evolution of the K3-VE engine from the Perodua Myvi. Perodua claims ECE fuel consumption figures of 21.7 km/L for the manual variant and 21.0 km/L with the automatic, while the auto-only Advance variant is capable of 22.0 km/L, courtesy of the new Eco Idle stop-start system and regenerative braking.

The 1NR-VE engine features dual variable-valve timing with intelligence (VVT-i) on both intake and exhaust valves. Additionally, the 1NR-VE features longer ports in its intake system for improved low- and mid-range torque, and a low-friction roller rocker arm-based valvetrain for improved fuel efficiency.

Both 1KR-VE and 1NR-VE engines are paired to a 5-speed manual (5MT) or 4-speed electronic automatic transmission (4E-AT). The Standard G and Premium X variants are sold with both manual and automatic options, while the Advance variant is limited to the automatic. Both 1KR-VE and 1NR-VE engines are also Euro IV compliant.

The 2020 facelift version saw the discontinuation of Premium X MT variant which meant a 1.3 litre engine could no longer be paired with a 5-speed manual.

== Safety ==
ASEAN NCAP test results Perodua Bezza (2016)
Test	Points	Stars
Adult occupant:	15.38	4 /5 stars
Child occupant:	85%	4 /5 stars
Safety assist:	NA	

ASEAN NCAP test results Perodua Bezza (2016)
Test	Points	Stars
Adult occupant:	15.38	5 /5 stars
Child occupant:	85%	4 /5 stars
Safety assist:	NA	

The Perodua Bezza features a number of active and passive safety features, and is Perodua's first model to offer vehicle stability control (VSC). ASEAN NCAP has awarded a 5-star safety rating for the Advance variant, and a 4-star rating for the rest of the range.

All Bezza variants are equipped with an anti-lock braking system (ABS) with electronic brake distribution (EBD), twin SRS airbags (for the driver and front passenger respectively), and twin rear reverse sensors as standard.

The range-topping Advance is the only variant with vehicle stability control (VSC), traction control (TRC), brake assist (BA), hill-start assist (HSA), and seat belt reminders for the driver and front passenger. The Advance variant is also equipped with a multimedia touchscreen head unit paired to a reverse camera.

The Premium X and Advance variants feature twin front parking sensors below the headlamps, solar & security window film, and anti-trap protection for the driver's side power window.

The 2020 facelift version saw VSC added to the Premium X variant and A.S.A or Advance Safety Assist was added to the Advance variant. This debuted in the Perodua Aruz, which includes Forward Collision Warning with pedestrian detection, Automatic Emergency Braking (operative from speeds of 4–80 km/h), Pedal Misoperation Control and Front Departure Alert, which alerts the driver of the vehicle in front has proceeded ahead, e.g. from a traffic light.

== Sales ==
Perodua has achieved promising sales for the Bezza, with a total of 5,000 bookings received for the new model on the first day after its launch. During Perodua's first half of 2016 review, it announced that it had received 10,115 bookings as of the morning of July 26, which averages out to about 1,000 cars per day since the Bezza was first opened for booking on July 16. On August 30, 2016 Perodua reported it had delivered 10,000 Bezzas, with the bookings at 25,000. In November 2018, it was reported that 138,800 Bezza have been produced. As of 2021, the Perodua Bezza is Perodua's third best selling model, and outsells the Proton Saga with 42,698 units sold compared to the Saga's 42,627 units sold.

Year	Malaysia (Note: Figures based on registration)
2016	34,930
2017	53,540
2018	49,911
2019	45,656
2020	56,995
2021	42,698
2022	69,439
2023	89,265
2024	100,814
2025	100,488

== Export ==
=== Mauritius ===
On 1 May 2017, Perodua announced the launch of four Bezza variants into Mauritius market to capitalize on Mauritius' status as a popular international tourist destination.

=== Singapore ===
Perodua Bezza is also sold in Singapore via Perocom Auto Pte Ltd in May 2017 with only one variant, 1.3X. The facelifted model was introduced in February 2020.

=== Sri Lanka ===
On 7 June 2017, the Bezza 1.0L (automatic transmission) made its debut in Sri Lanka at a launch organised by Perusahaan Otomobil Kedua Sdn Bhd's (Perodua) official distributor, Unimo Enterprises Ltd. The 1.0L variant received a design upgrade in February 2020.

=== Brunei ===
In mid-2017, Perodua Brunei's official distributor, GHK Motors Sdn Bhd made available the 1.3L Premium X variant with manual or automatic transmissions, optional body kits, and 2 years warranty.

In mid-2019, the Bezza 1.0 GXtra was launched while the manual or automatic transmissions were still unchanged but the 1.3 Premium X was dropped from the model range.

The Bezza's facelift update with the 1.0 G variant only with automatic transmission was launched on 18 September 2020 but the manual transmission of the variant was dropped.

=== Pakistan ===
The Bezza test drive model is spotted in Pakistan.

== Awards and accolades ==
- Best Child Occupant Protection (COP), Small Family Car Category - ASEAN NCAP Grand Prix Awards 2016
- Best Adult Occupant Protection (AOP), Small Family Car Category - ASEAN NCAP Grand Prix Awards 2016
- Best Family Ride of the Year (Below RM100k) - Carsifu Editor's Choice Awards 2016
- Most Significant Design Achievement - Malaysia Car of the Year (COTY) 2016
- People's Choice Award - Malaysia Car of the Year (COTY) 2016
- Entry Level Car of the Year - Malaysia Car of the Year (COTY) 2016
- Malaysia's Good Design Mark 2016
- Car of the Year - Frost & Sullivan 2017 Best Practices Award
- Debut Car of the Year - Frost & Sullivan 2017 Best Practices Award
- Sedan & Hatchback (Below RM50k) - Malaysia Car of the Year (COTY) 2017
- Best 3 City Cars of Malaysia - Aurizn Awards 2018 'Cars of Malaysia'
- Budget Car (Silver Winner) - Carlist.my People's Choice Awards 2018
