= Toyota KR engine =

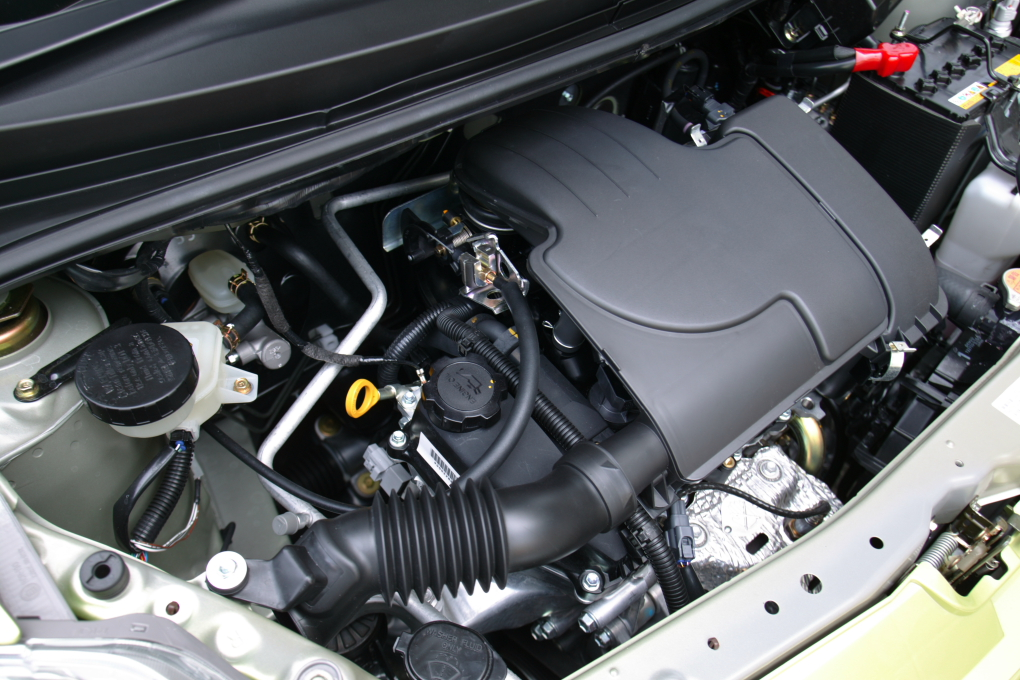
- 1KR-FE in a Daihatsu Sirion

Overview
- Manufacturer: Daihatsu
- Production: 2004–present

Layout
- Configuration: Straight-3
- Displacement: 1.0 L (998 cc)
- Cylinder bore: 71 mm (2.8 in)
- Piston stroke: 84 mm (3.31 in)
- Cylinder block material: Aluminium
- Cylinder head material: Aluminium
- Valvetrain: DOHC 4 valves x cyl. with VVT-i

Combustion
- Turbocharger: On 1KR-VET only
- Fuel system: Multi-point fuel injection
- Fuel type: Gasoline
- Cooling system: Water-cooled

Output
- Power output: 48–72 kW (64–97 bhp; 65–98 PS)
- Torque output: 85–140 N⋅m (63–103 lb⋅ft)

Dimensions
- Dry weight: 69 kg (152 lb)

Chronology
- Predecessor: Daihatsu EJ engine (I3); Toyota 1SZ-FE (I4)

The Toyota KR engine family is a straight-3 piston engine, designed by Daihatsu, a subsidiary of Toyota. The 1KR series uses aluminium engine blocks and chain driven DOHC cylinder heads. It uses multi-point fuel injection, and has 4 valves per cylinder. Some versions have VVT-i variable valve timing. The engine typically weighs 69 kg (150 lb) with all ancillaries but no fluids.

== 1KR-FE ==
The 1KR-FE is a 1.0 L (998 cc) version built in Japan and Poland. Bore and stroke is 71 mm × 84 mm (2.80 in × 3.31 in), with a compression ratio of 10.5:1. Output is 67 PS (49 kW; 66 bhp) at 6000 rpm with 91 N⋅m (67 lb⋅ft) of torque at 4800 rpm - and a rev-limit of 6500 rpm - or 71 PS (52 kW; 70 bhp) at 6000 rpm with 94 N⋅m (69 lb⋅ft) of torque at 3600 rpm. When originally on sale it met European emission standard EU4 requirements and had CO_{2} levels of 109 g/km, but current applications meet European emission standard EU5 and can have CO_{2} levels as low as 99 g/km. This engine has been given the 2007, 2008, 2009 and 2010 International Engine of the Year awards in the sub-1.0 liter category.

The engine was also adapted to meet European emission standard EU6 and can have CO_{2} levels as low as 88/89 g/km in Toyota Aygo or Citroën C1/Peugeot 108 since 2014 in NEDC.

=== Applications ===
- Daihatsu Boon/Toyota Passo/Daihatsu Sirion/Subaru Justy
- Toyota Aygo/Citroën C1 (2005–2021)
- Vitz/Yaris (XP90)/Vitz/Yaris (XP130)/Yaris (XP210) (2005–present)
- Toyota Belta (2006–2012)
- Toyota iQ (2008–2015)
- Daihatsu Cuore L276 (2007–2013)
- Peugeot 107 (2005–2014)
- Peugeot 108 (2014–2021)
- Daihatsu Thor/Toyota Tank/Toyota Roomy/Subaru Justy (2016–present)

== 1KR-DE ==
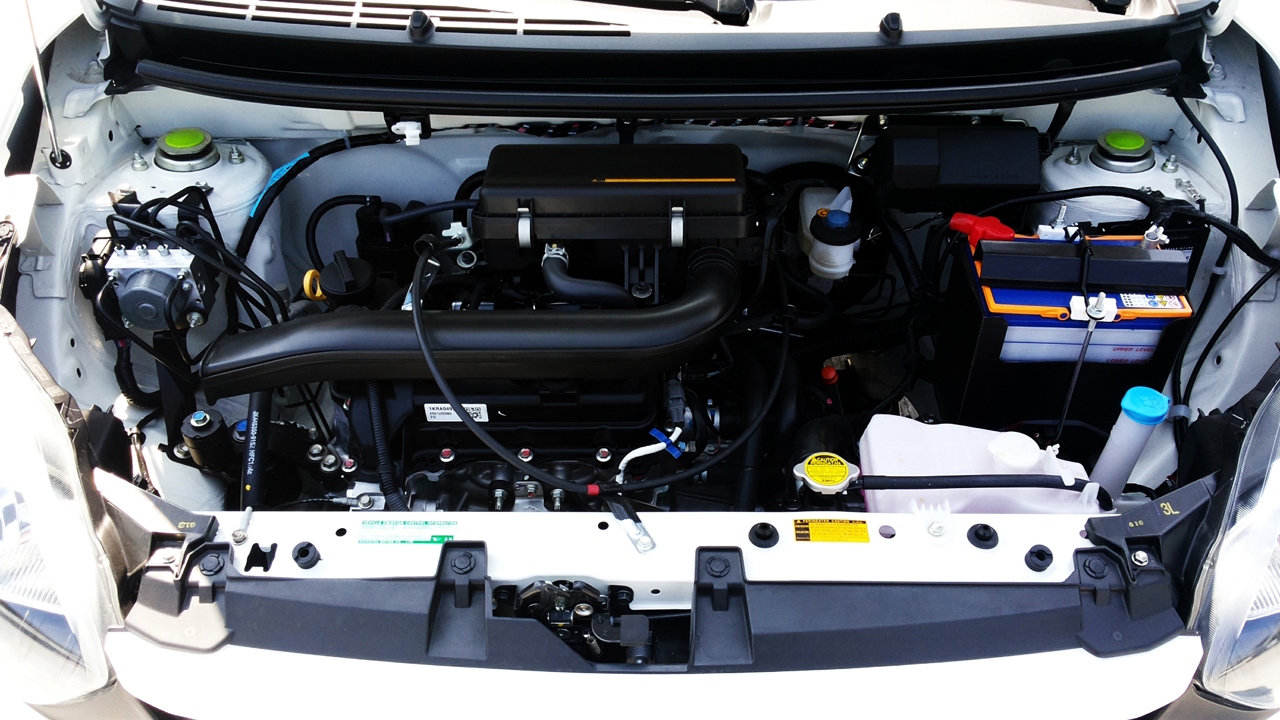
1KR-DE engine in a Toyota Wigo

The 1KR-DE is the non-VVT-i variant of the 1KR engine made by Daihatsu. It produces less power and torque than the 1KR-FE. Output is 65 PS (48 kW; 64 bhp) at 6000 rpm and 85 N⋅m (63 lb⋅ft) of torque at 3600 rpm. Bore and stroke is 71 mm × 84 mm (2.80 in × 3.31 in), while the engine displacement is 1.0 L (998 cc).

The 1KR-DE was specially designed for the Indonesian LCGC (Low Cost Green Car) market to reduce cost. The cylinder head cover is made from a lightweight plastic-resin material. The exhaust manifold is integrated to the cylinder head together with the catalytic converter and oxygen sensor to save even more weight as well as helping the engine to warm up quicker, reducing total exhaust emissions. There was an overall saving of 10 kg (22 lb).

=== Applications ===
- Daihatsu Ayla (2013–2023)
- Toyota Agya/Wigo (2013–2017)
- Daihatsu Hi-Max, based on tenth generation Hijet Truck (2016–2019)

== 1KR-DE2 ==
The 1KR-DE2 is the more powerful variant of the 1KR-DE engine which is redesigned by Perodua. It produces 66 PS (49 kW; 65 bhp) at 6000 rpm and 90 N⋅m (66 lb⋅ft) of torque at 3600 rpm. Like the 1KR-DE, bore and stroke are at 71 mm × 84 mm (2.80 in × 3.31 in), respectively and engine displacement remains at 1.0 L (998 cc) The 1KR-DE2 achieves Euro IV emission standard and it is very fuel efficient due to the ECO Mode, where the engine will exchange drop one cylinder for every two cycles, effectively achieving the economy of a 0.6 L (600 cc) engine, surpasses the 1KR-DE. The compression ratio for this engine is 11:1.

=== Applications ===
- Perodua Axia (2014–2017)

== 1KR-VE ==
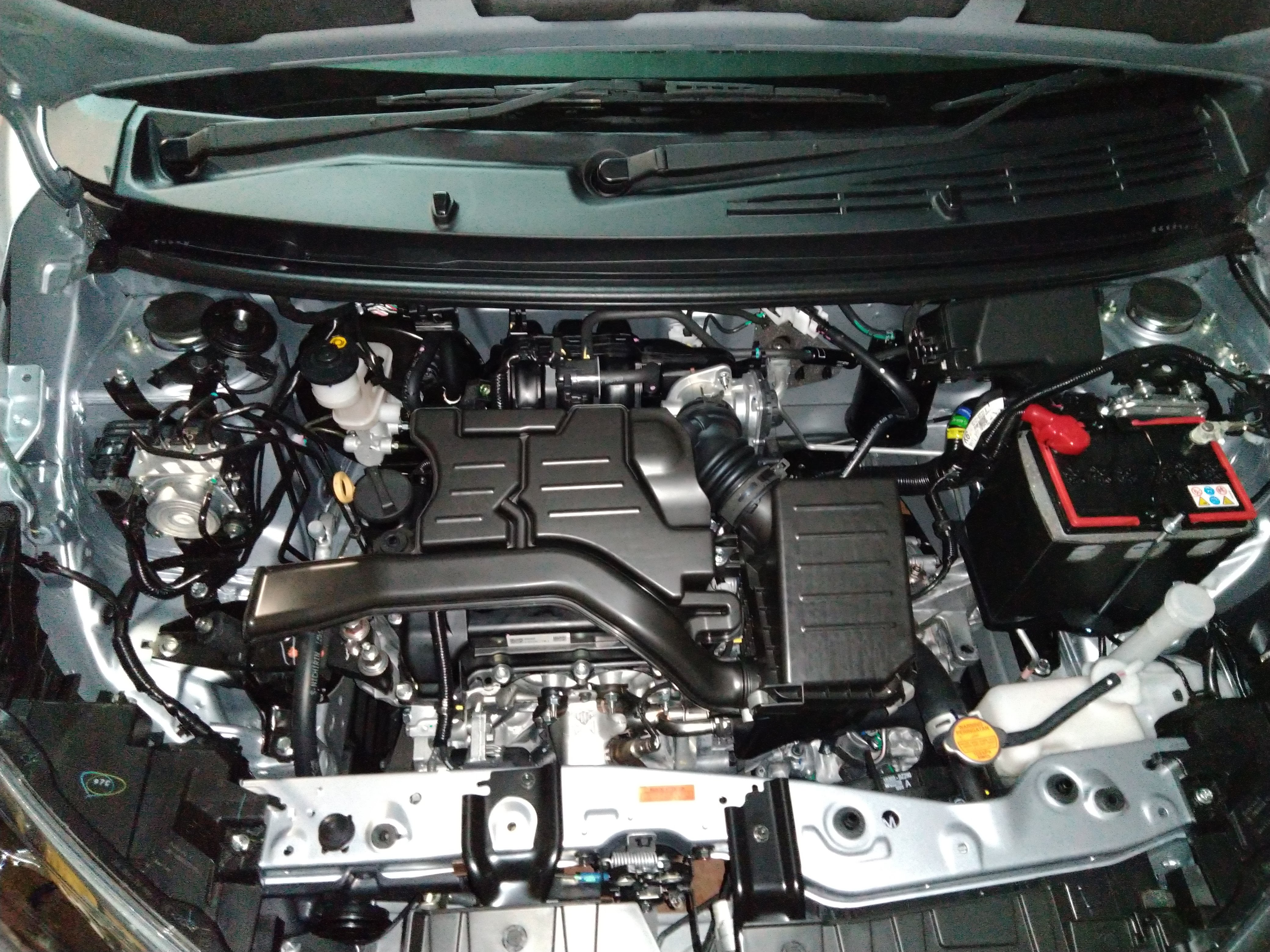
1KR-VE engine in a Perodua Bezza

The 1KR-VE is a more powerful variant made by Perodua specifically improved version from the 1KR-DE2 which is made for the newest edition in the Perodua family. New 1.0-litre VVT-i engine is lighter & compact for better fuel consumption, better performance, reduced vibration & noise level. It was specifically made for the 1.0-litre variant for Perodua's first solely in-house manufactured car which is the Perodua Bezza. It is a modified and refined version of the 1KR-DE2 engine from the Perodua Axia. The new 1KR-VE engine produces 68 PS (50 kW; 67 bhp) at 6,000 rpm and 91 N⋅m (67 lb⋅ft) at 4,400 rpm, offering a mild 1 hp (0.75 kW) and 1 N⋅m (0.74 lb⋅ft) increase over the Axia's 1KR-DE2 plant. Perodua claims ECE fuel consumption figures of 22.8 km/L (64 mpg_{‑imp}; 54 mpg_{‑US}) for the manual variant and 21.3 km/L (60 mpg_{‑imp}; 50 mpg_{‑US}) with the automatic, both exhibiting a 1.2 km/L (3.4 mpg_{‑imp}; 2.8 mpg_{‑US}) improvement over the old 1KR-DE2. The new 1KR-VE engine now features variable-valve timing with intelligence (VVT-i) on the intake valves. Several minor changes and refinements were also introduced for increased fuel efficiency and more linear power delivery. Notable changes include a higher 11.5:1 compression ratio, a high-tumble intake port, a longer intake manifold, micro fuel spray injection and low-friction valve lifters.

=== Applications ===
- Perodua Bezza (2016–present)
- Daihatsu Sigra (2016–present)
- Perodua Axia (B200) (2017–present)
- Perodua Axia (A300) (2023–present)
- Toyota Wigo (B100) (2017–2023)
- Toyota Wigo (A350) (2023–present)
- Toyota Agya (2017–2021)
- Daihatsu Ayla (2023–present)

== 1KR-VET ==
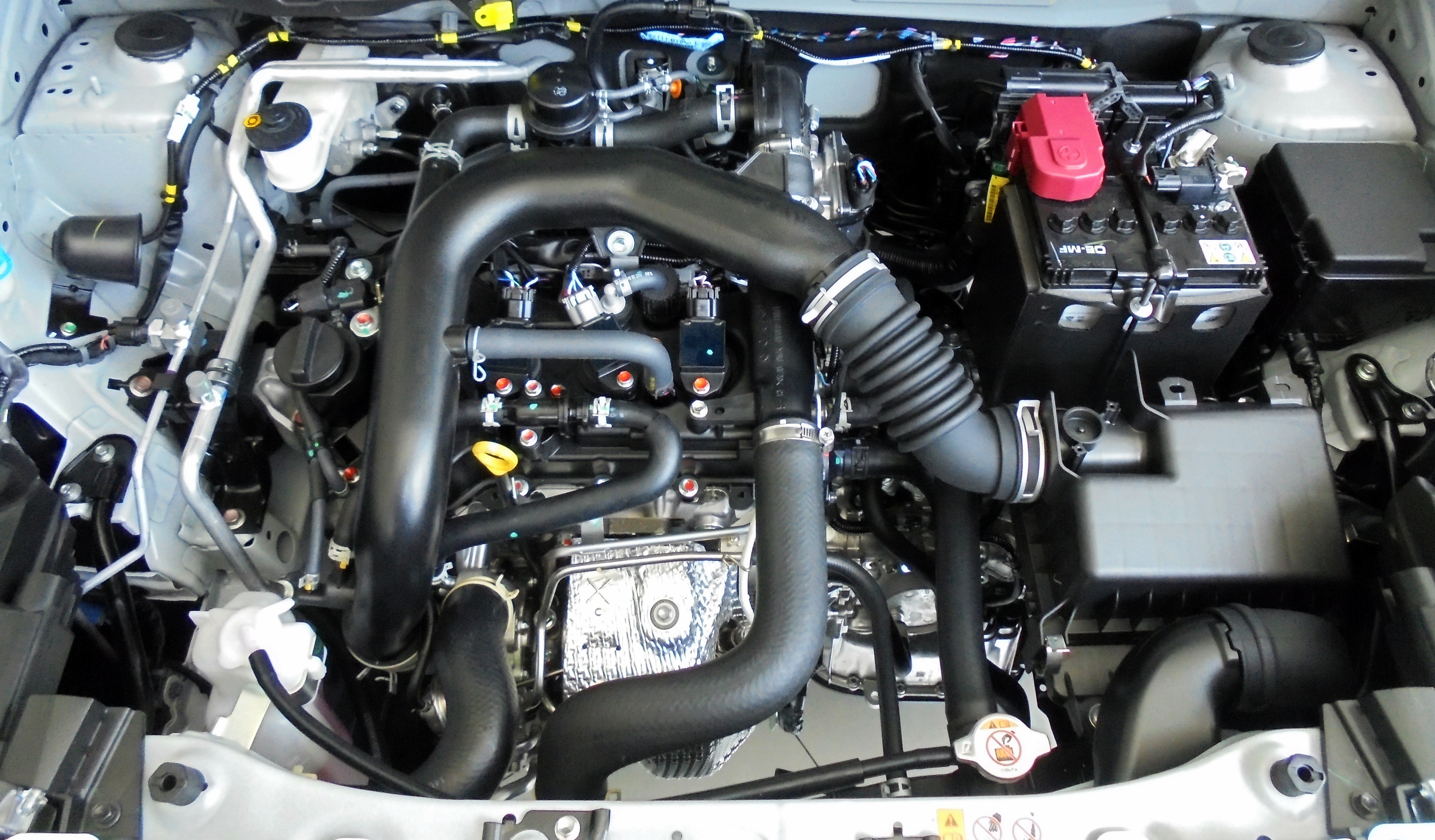
1KR-VET engine in a Toyota Raize

The 1KR-VET (996 cc) is a turbocharged version of the 1KR-FE with lowered compression ratio of 9.5:1 and redline of 6200 rpm. Produced by Daihatsu for use in the top-of-the-range version of the Daihatsu Thor and the A200/A250 series Rocky. It delivers 98 PS (72 kW; 97 bhp) and 140–149 N⋅m (103–110 lb⋅ft) of torque.

=== Applications ===
- Daihatsu Thor/Toyota Tank/Toyota Roomy/Subaru Justy (2016–present)
- Daihatsu Rocky/Toyota Raize (2019–present)
- Perodua Ativa (2021–present)

== 1KR-B52 ==
Revised version used in PSA Citroën C1/Peugeot 108 since 2016. First appeared in Citroën C1 UrbanRide and Elle special editions and later rolled out to all. The engine was modified to meet the Euro 6.2 emission standard whilst boosting performance to 73 PS (54 kW; 72 bhp) and economy up to 58.8 mpg on combined WLTP cycle while keeping emissions at 110 g/km co2 on WLTP cycle.

=== Applications ===
- Citroën C1/Peugeot 108 (2016–2021)
- Toyota Aygo X (2022–2025)

== See also ==
- List of Toyota engines
