= GXS (disambiguation) =

GXS is an American IT services company.

GXS may also refer to:

- a Singapore digital bank owned by Grab and Singtel
- a 2004 manual transmission model of Perodua Kelisa
- Gun X Sword, a series of Gun Sword anime episodes
