= Perodua Kancil =

Malaysian city car

Perodua Kancil (L200)
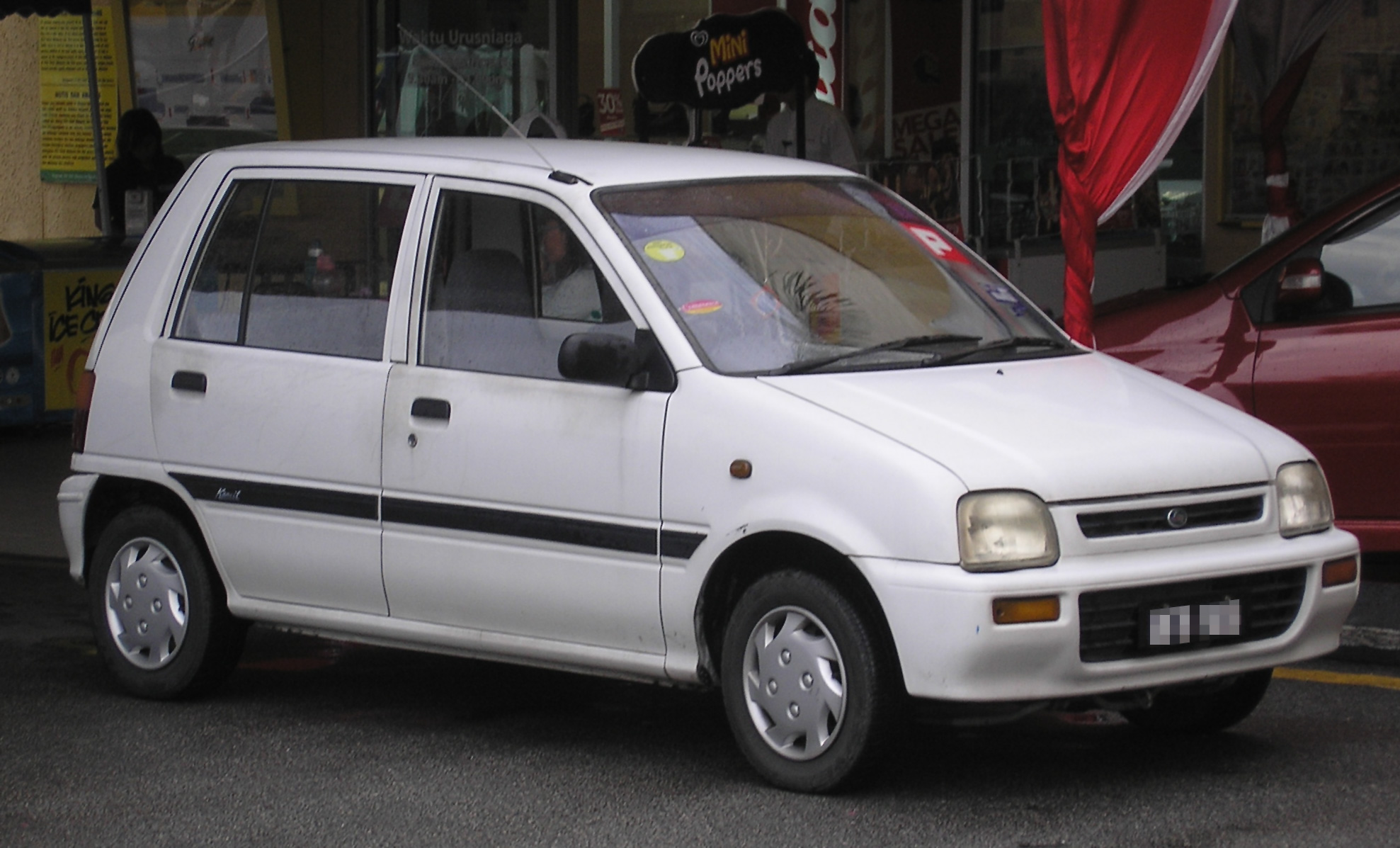

Overview
- Manufacturer: Perodua
- Also called: Perodua Nippa (United Kingdom); Daihatsu Ceria (Indonesia)
- Production: August 1994 – July 2009; 722,223 built
- Assembly: Malaysia: Rawang, Selangor; Indonesia: Sunter, North Jakarta (ADM, Ceria)

Body and chassis
- Class: City car
- Body style: 5-door hatchback
- Layout: Front-engine, front-wheel-drive
- Related: Daihatsu Mira (L200)

Powertrain
- Engine: Petrol: 0.7 L Daihatsu EF-CL SOHC I3; 0.8 L Daihatsu ED-10 SOHC I3; 0.8 L Daihatsu ED-DE DOHC I3
- Transmission: 4-speed manual 5-speed manual 3-speed automatic

Dimensions
- Wheelbase: 2,280 mm (89.8 in)
- Length: 3,395 mm (133.7 in)
- Width: 1,405 mm (55.3 in)
- Height: 1,415 mm (55.7 in)
- Curb weight: 650–690 kg (1,430–1,520 lb)

Chronology
- Successor: Perodua Viva; Perodua Kelisa

The Perodua Kancil (also known as the Perodua Nippa in the United Kingdom, and Daihatsu Ceria in Indonesia) is a city car manufactured by Malaysian automobile manufacturer Perodua from August 1994 to July 2009. The Kancil is a rebadged third generation (L200) Daihatsu Mira.

== Etymology ==
The Kancil is named after the mouse deer, a native animal related to Malay fable and commonly found in Malaysian jungle.

== History ==
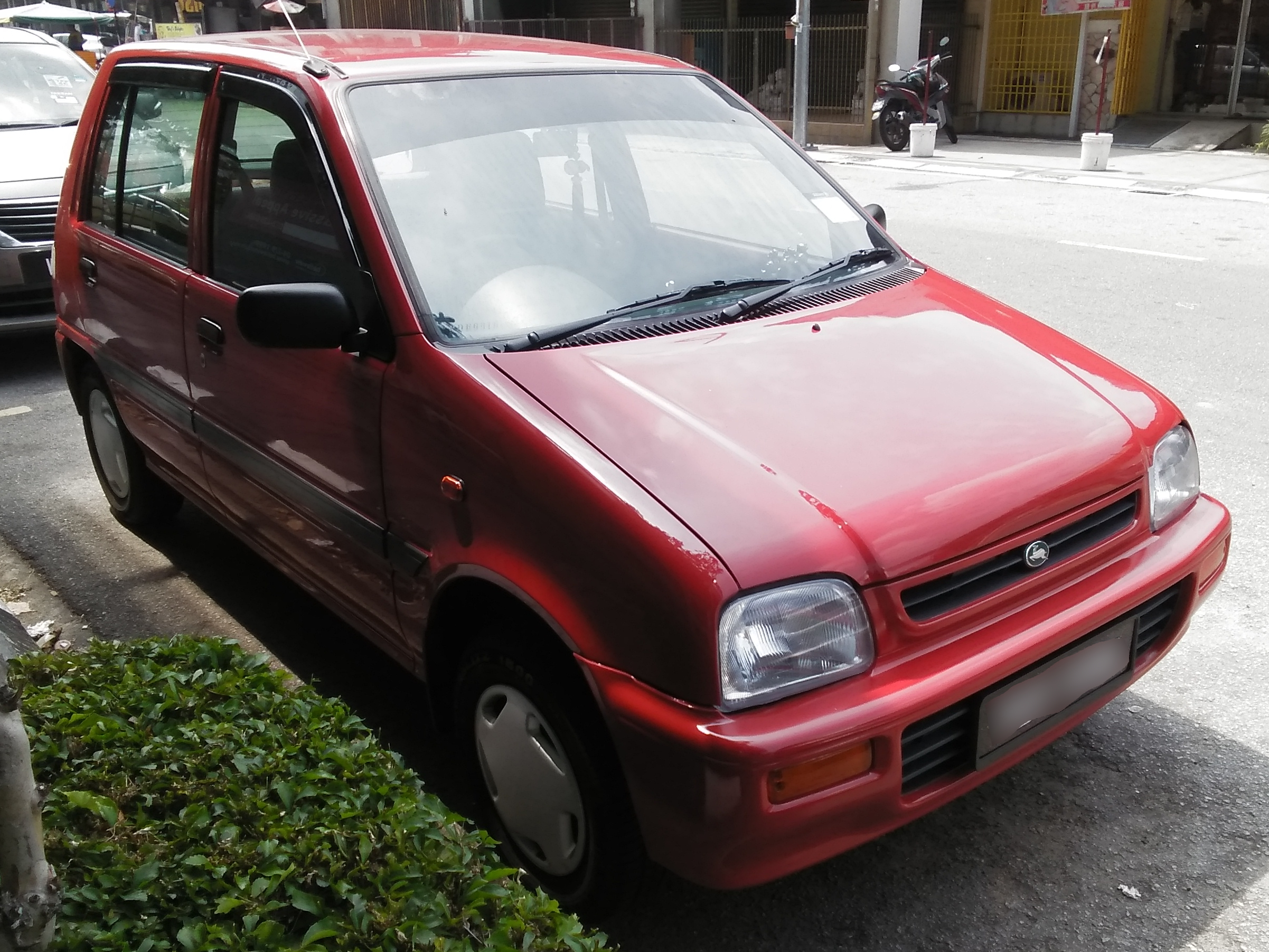

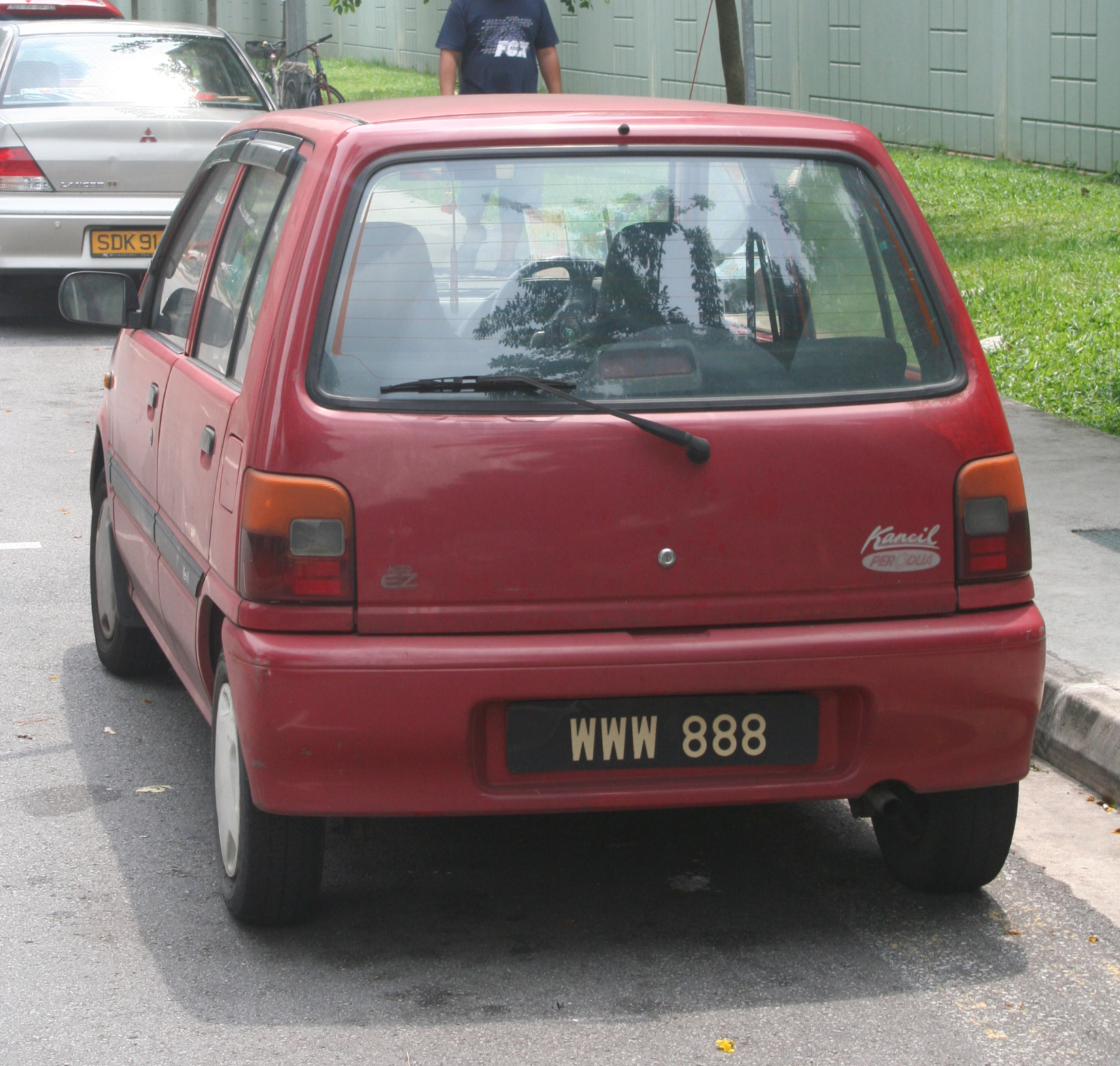
1994–1997

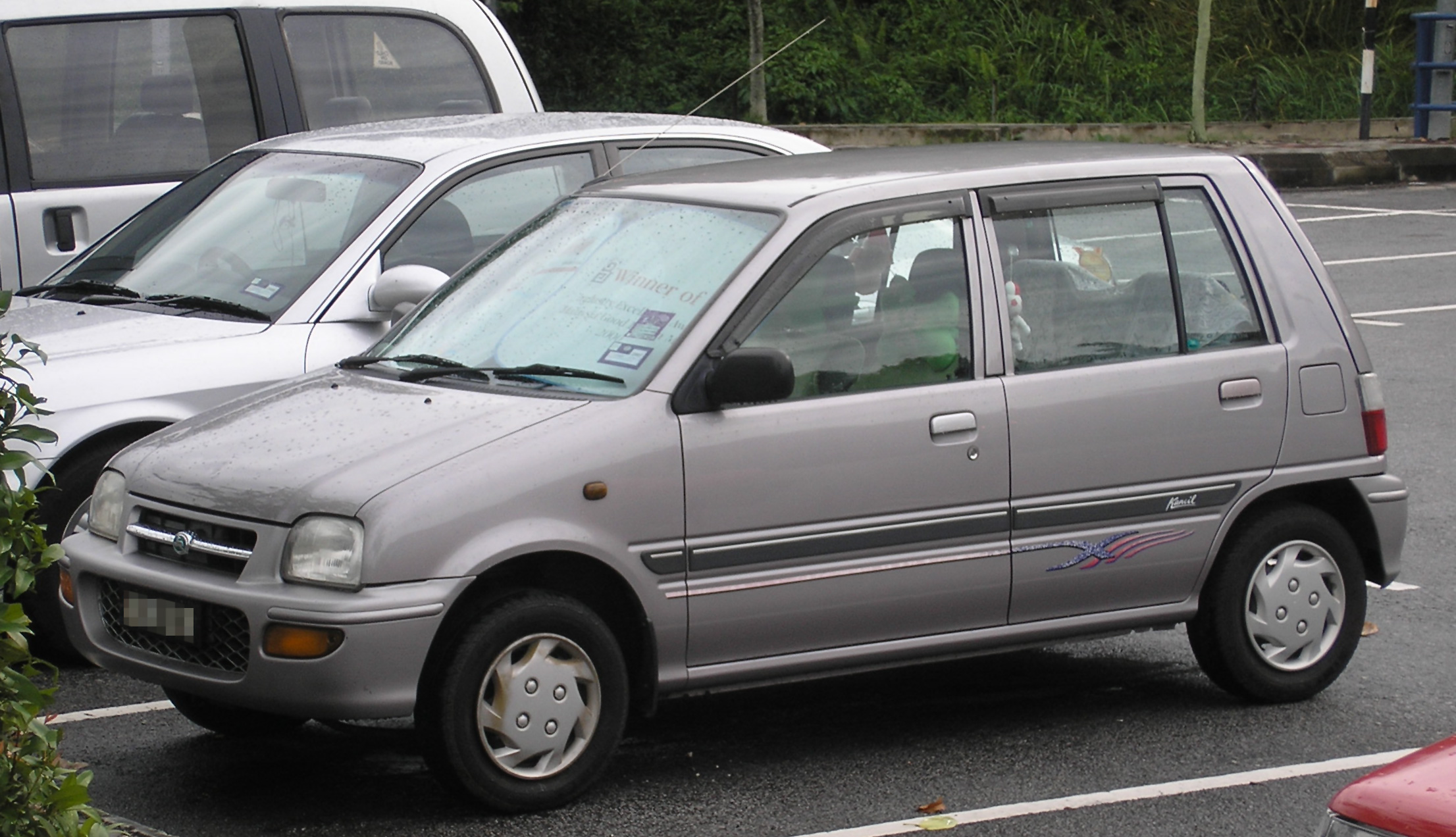

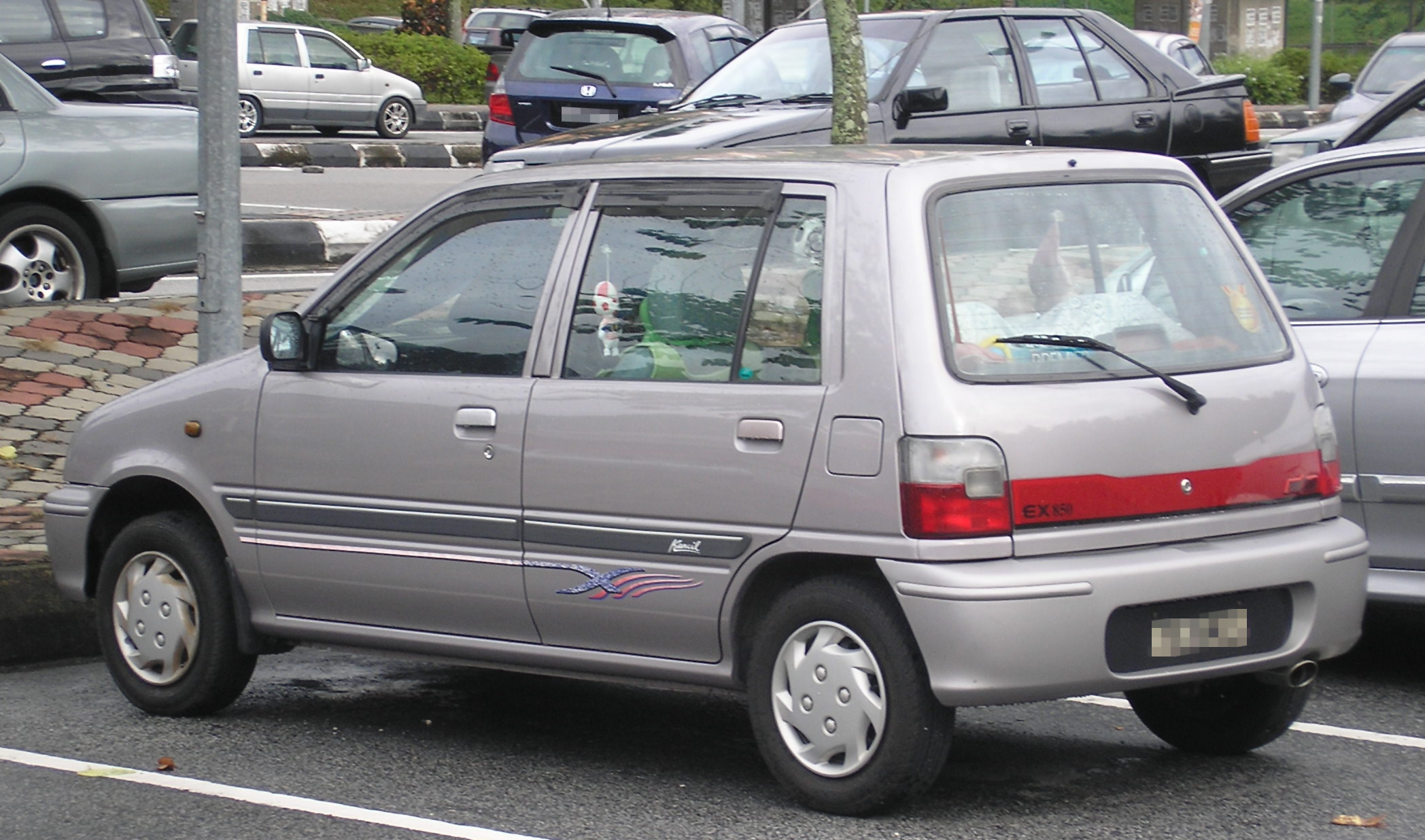
1997–2000

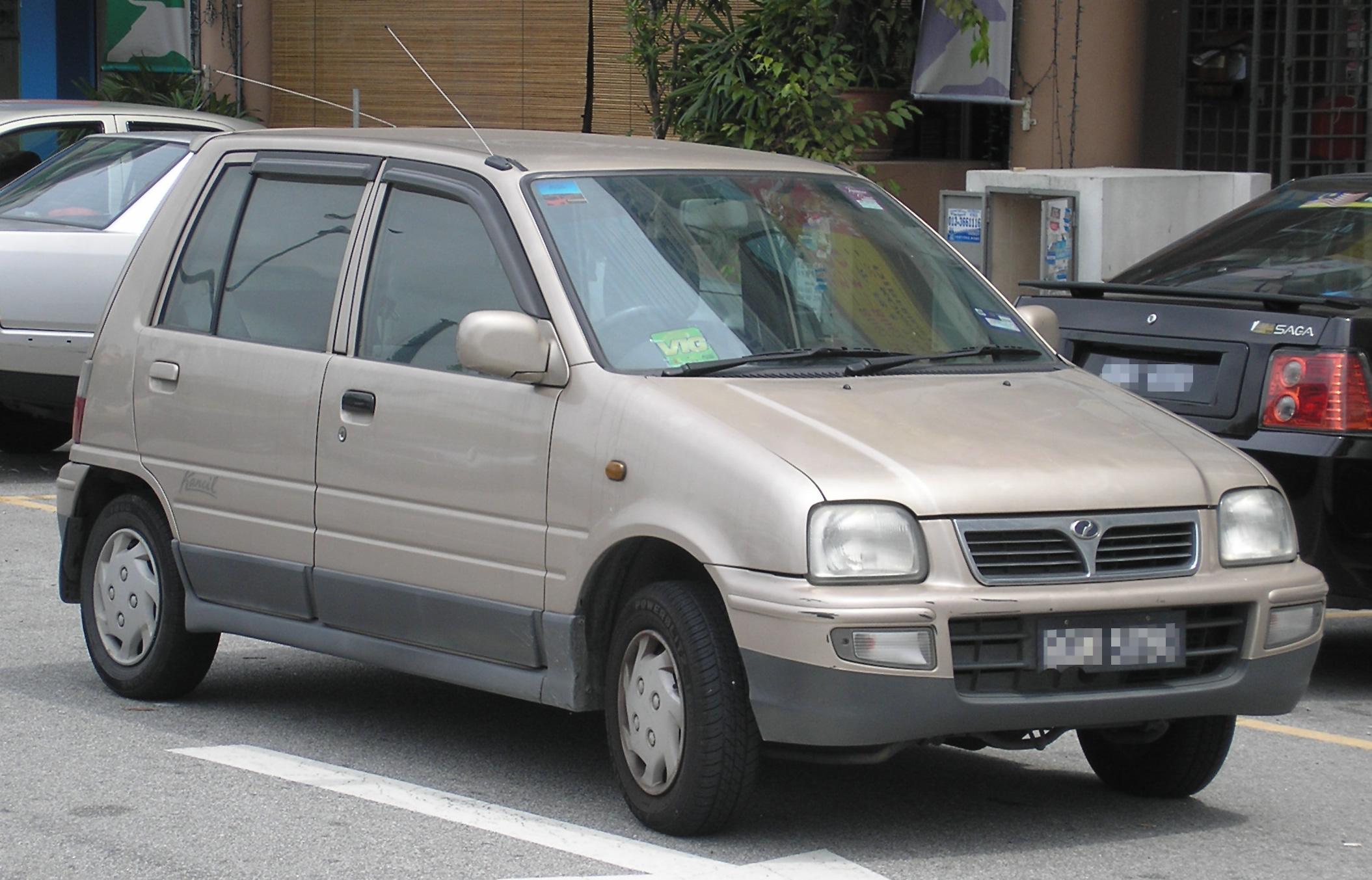

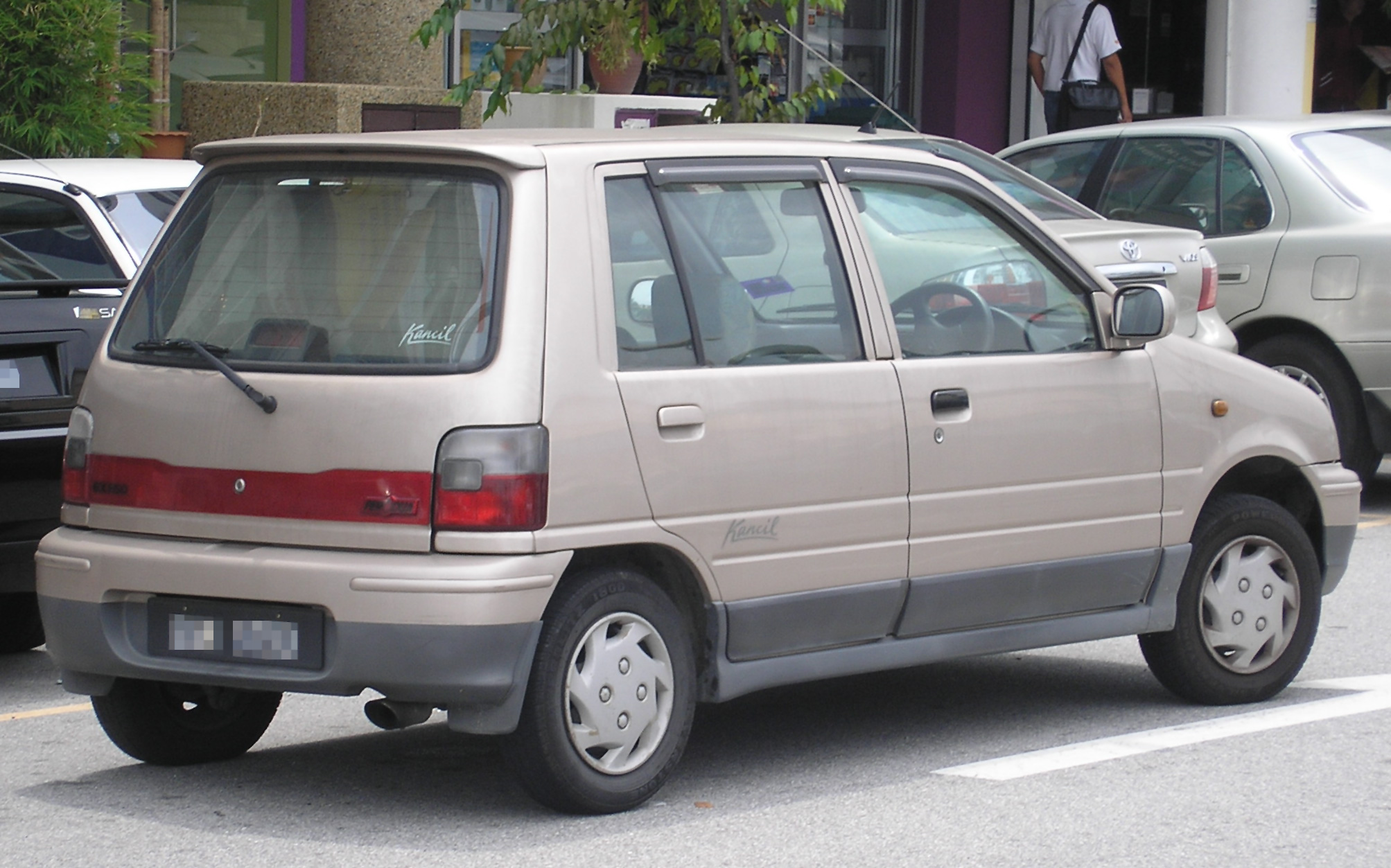
2000–2002

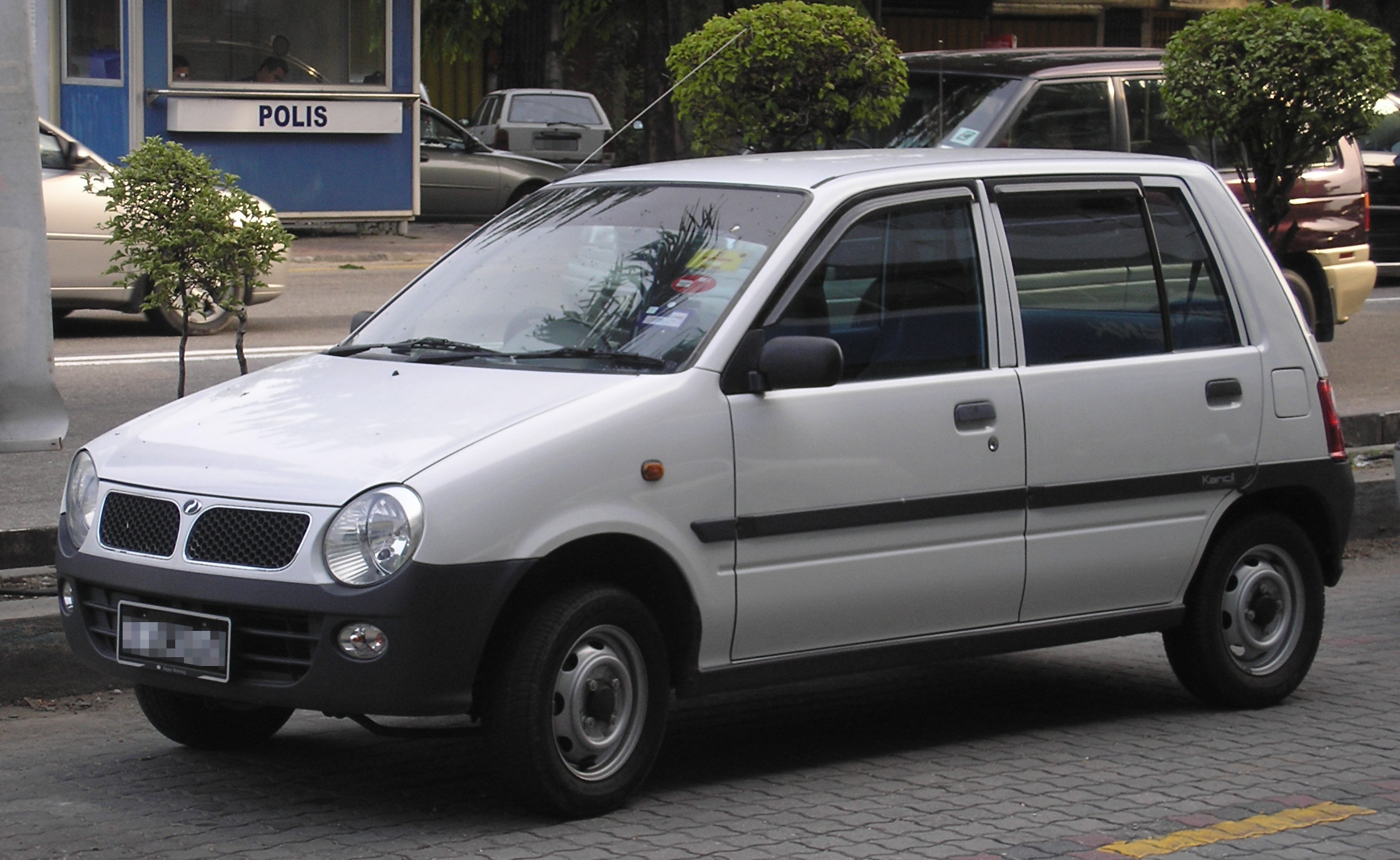

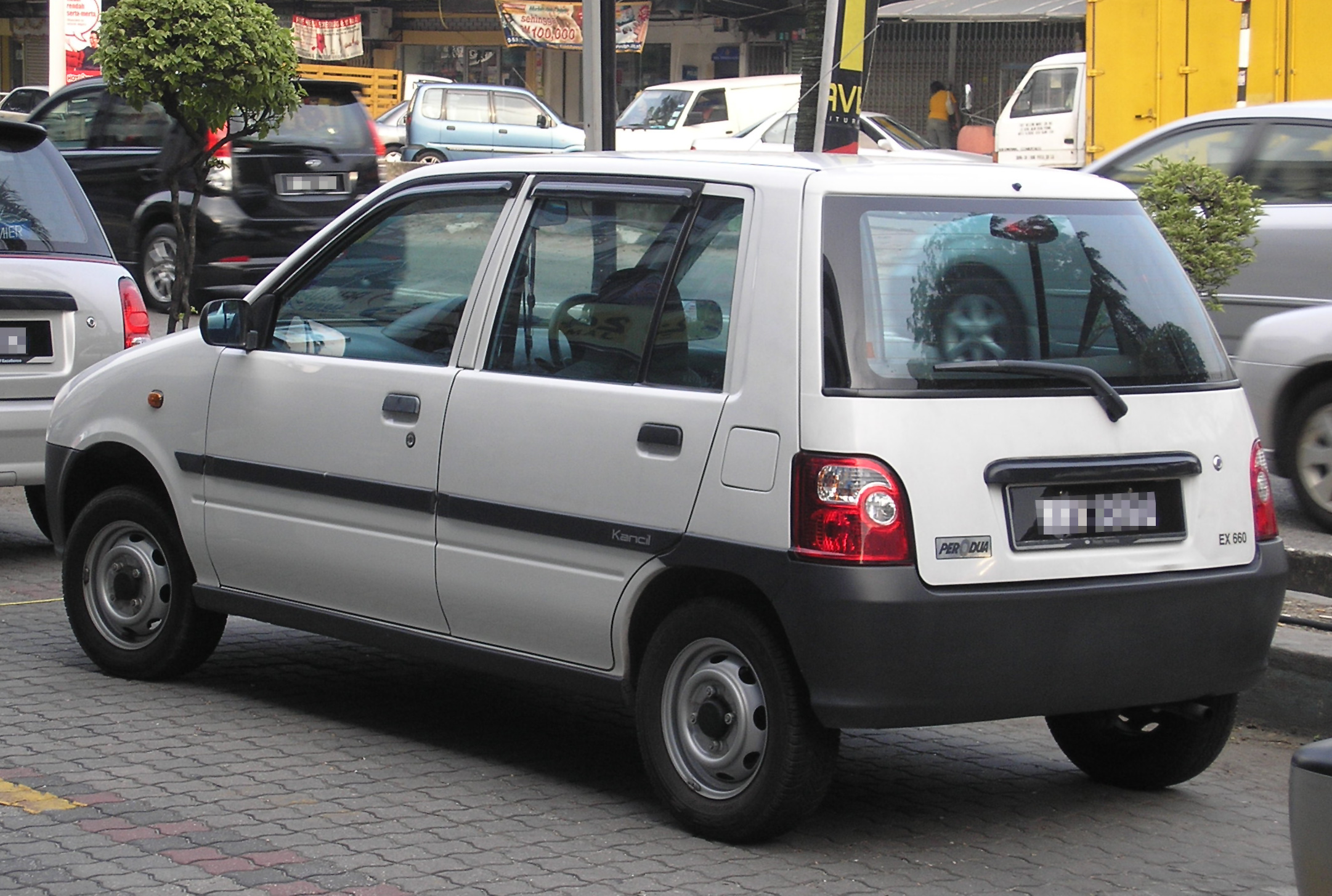
2002–2009

The Kancil was Perodua's first car after its founding in 1993. It is a small five-door hatchback vehicle on a monocoque framework that can seat five people. The Kancil, like its predecessors, is a slightly modified Daihatsu Mira L200; rebadging is common in Malaysia's automotive industry, having begun in 1985 with first car manufacturer Proton, which based its cars on retired models of Mitsubishi Motors. Subsequent Kancils were only rejuvenated cosmetically as Perodua maintained the monocoque structure and tweaked its engines.

The car was available with two engines, a 660 cc version with 31 PS (23 kW) and an 850 with 37 PS (27 kW). Four- or five-speed manual transmissions were available (four-speed was not available in the 850) or a three-speed automatic.

The Kancil was unveiled on 29 August 1994. At launch two variants were on offered: EX and GX both powered by a 660 cc engine and both paired to a manual transmission. 4-speed manual for the EX and 5-speed manual for the GX.

In January 1995, the Perodua Kancil EZ was launched. It came with an automatic transmission and in addition to the existing equipment on the GX variant, there was colored bumpers, gear lock, side protector molding, hazard sign and the first-aid kit for metallic and mica models only. It was launched at RM28,931.14 for the solid colors (Kristal White and Bunga Raya Red), RM 29,838.14 for the Metallic version (Kilauan Silver) and RM 30,214.00 for the Mica version (Blue Mica) in Peninsular Malaysia.

In August 1996, the Perodua Kancil 850cc version was launched. It came with both GX (manual transmission) and EZ (automatic transmission) variants in addition to the existing 660cc version. Their features and colours are carried over from both GX and EZ of 660cc version, with additional of front power windows, and with Violet Purple colour instead of Blue Mica and Classic Blue. Their prices were quite little higher than 660cc versions because of the bigger 850cc engine volume and power, as well as the latter additional equipment. Besides both variants, the additional 850cc GX based Kancil Era variant was also introduced.

On 27 August 1997, the Perodua Kancil was facelifted. Changes included new design for the larger front grille, rear garnish, rounded indicator lights, clear rear signal lenses (amber in pre-facelift) and different wheel caps designs, new cabin upholstery with the use of improved seat fabric and 2 front washer nozzles. The Kancil 850 cc series, got new white faced metres and adjustable head rest. Prices were between RM 24,833.74 to RM 33,465.84.

On 3 May 1998, the Perodua Kancil EX extra was launched. It came with a 660cc engine and 5-speed manual transmission. Around the same time, the Kancil 850cc series was updated with the use of different upholstery on the door cards and seats. Lastly, a centre console with storage area and coin slots replaced a simple rubber boot.

On 14 October 1999, Prime Minister Mahathir Mohamad unveiled the new look Perodua Kancil and launched Perodua e-shoppe during the opening of the KL Motorsport Show 1999. This is the second facelift for the Kancil since it was first launched in August 1994.

In 2000, the car was given another slight facelift consisting of body-coloured side mouldings, a new grille and reprofiled front bumper with larger indicators, and electrical adjustable side mirrors were equipped for 850cc models.This facelift was available with three variants: 660 EX, 850 EX and 850 EZ.

The Kancil received a more extensive restyling in September 2002, featuring rounder headlights, taillights and bumpers; its rear license plate was also repositioned onto its hatch from the bumper below. Its interior features a flushed dashboard with the combination instrumentation panel placed in the middle similar to that of the Toyota Yaris. However, it is still mechanically identical to its predecessor, except for the EZi automatic transmission variant which was given a fuel-injected powerplant though this variant wasn't available at launch. Perodua cited Daihatsu’s thorough testing procedures and the engine being made locally with many local component for the EZi variant to be only introduced later on. At launch only manual transmission equipped variants were available: 660EX and 850EX.

In February 2003, the Perodua Kancil EZi was launched. It came with an automatic transmission and an electronic fuel injected engine. Between June and August 2004, a 660 EXb variant or 660 EX Basic variant was made available as the new base model. Notable omissions from the 660 EX variant included the passenger visor, a clock, door visors, rear wiper, a radio with speakers and an alarm with central locking. Solid Ivory White was the only colour option for this variant.

Between May and December 2005, a 850 EXS variant was made available. This variant stood for special edition and was priced not much different to the 850 EX variant which it shared the same powertrain (engine and transmission combination) with. Key features of this variant included 12" alloy wheels like on the 850 EZi variant, a CD player. skirting/bodykit, blue graphics for the instrument cluster, silver painted centre cluster and a leather wrapped steering wheel. Metallic Ebony Black and Metallic Glittering Silver were the only two colour options for this variant. It is interesting to note that other variants either had no radio or a radio with cassette making this variant the only Kancil variant to come with a CD player.

From July 2005 a tuned Kancil SE version was also available. Between February and March 2008, both the 850 EXS and 850 EZi model was dropped. Production of Kancil ceased on 20 July 2009 and replaced by the Perodua Viva.

== Powertrains ==
The Kancil was sold with various engines and transmissions:

- 659 cc Daihatsu EF-CL single over head cam, three-cylinder carbureted in-line engine producing 31 PS (23 kW). Paired to a four speed manual transmission or a five-speed manual transmission or a three-speed automatic. Application - 660 EX, 660 EXb, 660 EX Extra, 660 GX and 660 EZ variants.
- 847 cc Daihatsu ED-10 three-cylinder carbureted in-line engine producing 37 PS (27 kW). Paired to a five-speed manual transmission or a three-speed automatic transmission. Applications - 850 EX, 850 GX. 850 EZ and 850 EXS variants.
- 847 cc Daihatsu ED-DE three-cylinder fuel-injected in-line engine, 50 PS (37 kW). Paired to a three-speed automatic transmission only. Application - 850 EZi variant only.

== Sales ==
Following its release in 1994, the Kancil became an instant success in Malaysia. The Kancil is popular with beginner drivers and is commonly used in Malaysian driving schools. It was also preferable for its fuel efficiency and ease of parking due to its size. In December 1995, Perodua produced its 50,000th Kancil. By January 1997, 100,000 Kancils had been manufactured, and by 1999 250,000 had been built. Average monthly production during its fifteen years was 4,000, with October 2002 being the most successful month with 7,700 built. In total 722,223 Kancils were built, of which around 14,000 were exported.

Year	Malaysia (Note: Figures based on registration)	Indonesia
Year	Perodua Kancil	Daihatsu Ceria
2000	75,954	
2001	73,957	834
2002	62,744	969
2003	61,435	1,116
2004	58,351	335
2005	53,039	256
2006	36,854	95
2007	17,689	
2008	7,116	
2009	3,164	

== Export ==
The Kancil was exported to a total of 19 different countries. This includes Brunei and Mauritius starting from 1996 and Sri Lanka from 1997.

=== United Kingdom ===
The Perodua Kancil was sold in the United Kingdom as the Perodua Nippa from September 1997. It was priced at just over £5,000 (cut to £4,999 in 1999) it was the cheapest new car on sale there until it was replaced by the Perodua Kelisa four years later. The Nippa was exclusively sold with 850cc fuel injected engines, engine code ED-20 SOHC.

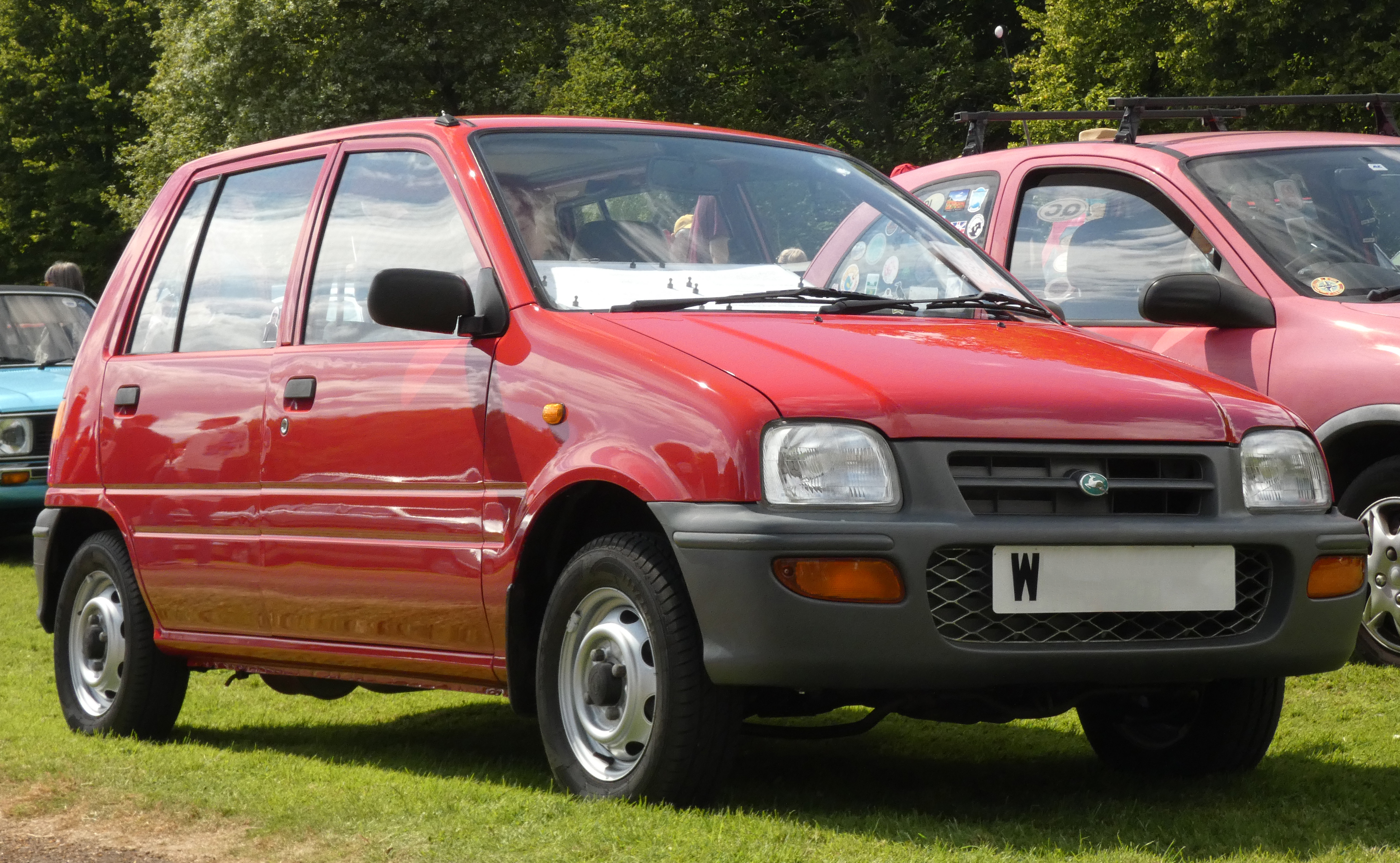
Perodua Nippa

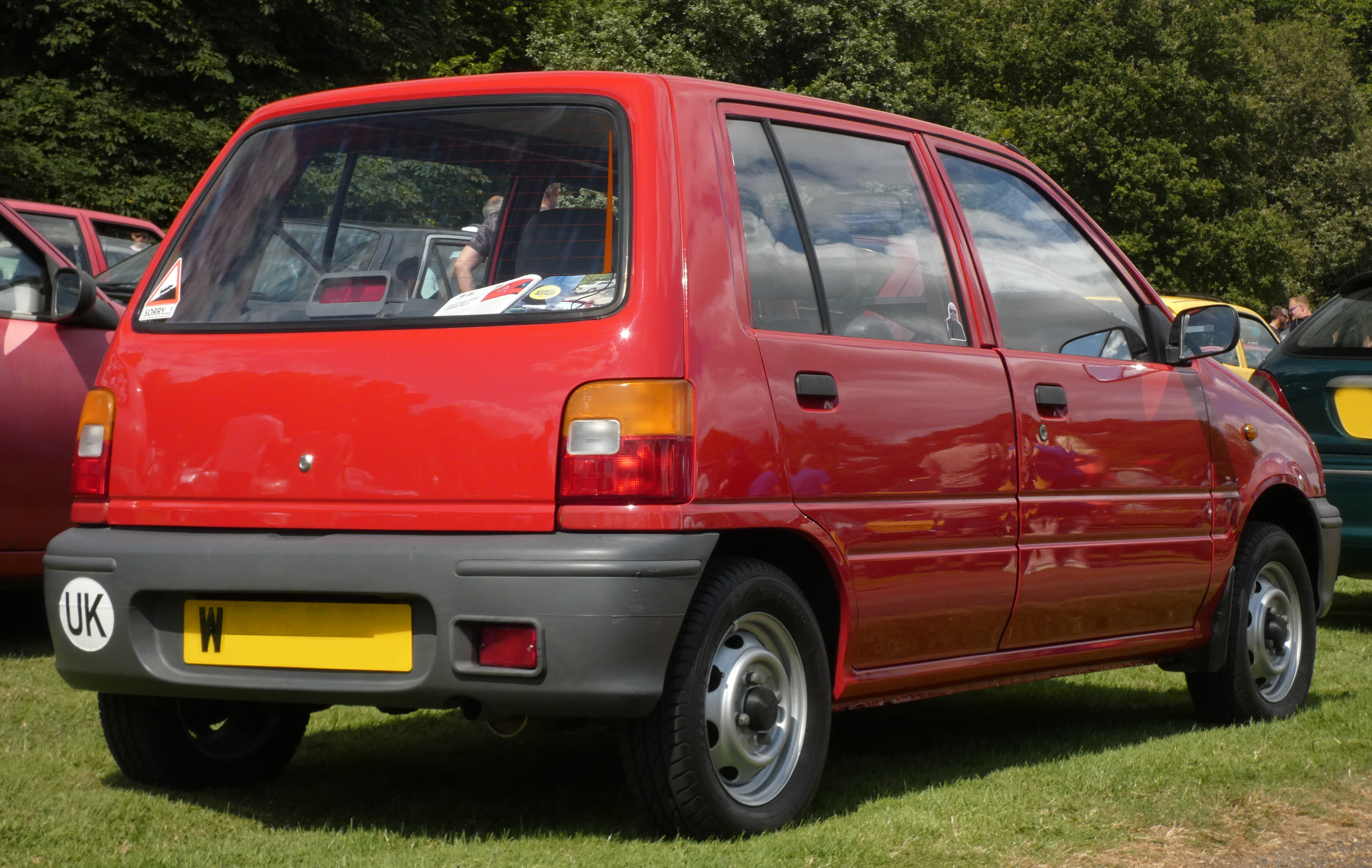
Perodua Nippa

=== Indonesia ===
In Indonesia, the Perodua Kancil was sold as the Daihatsu Ceria. The Ceria, meaning "happy" or "cheerful" in Malay/Indonesian, was introduced at the 11th Gaikindo Auto Expo in Jakarta in July 2001. It had been preceded the year before by the Daihatsu KX-P "concept car" - a standard Kancil equipped with a leather and wood interior. The Ceria was only available with the larger 850 cc engine with a carburettor and 37 PS (27 kW), in two equipment levels: the base model KL and the more extra-spec KX, which received a chromed grille. It was discontinued in 2006. It was later superseded in 2012 by an indirect successor, the Daihatsu Ayla, which in turn also produced in Malaysia as the Perodua Axia.

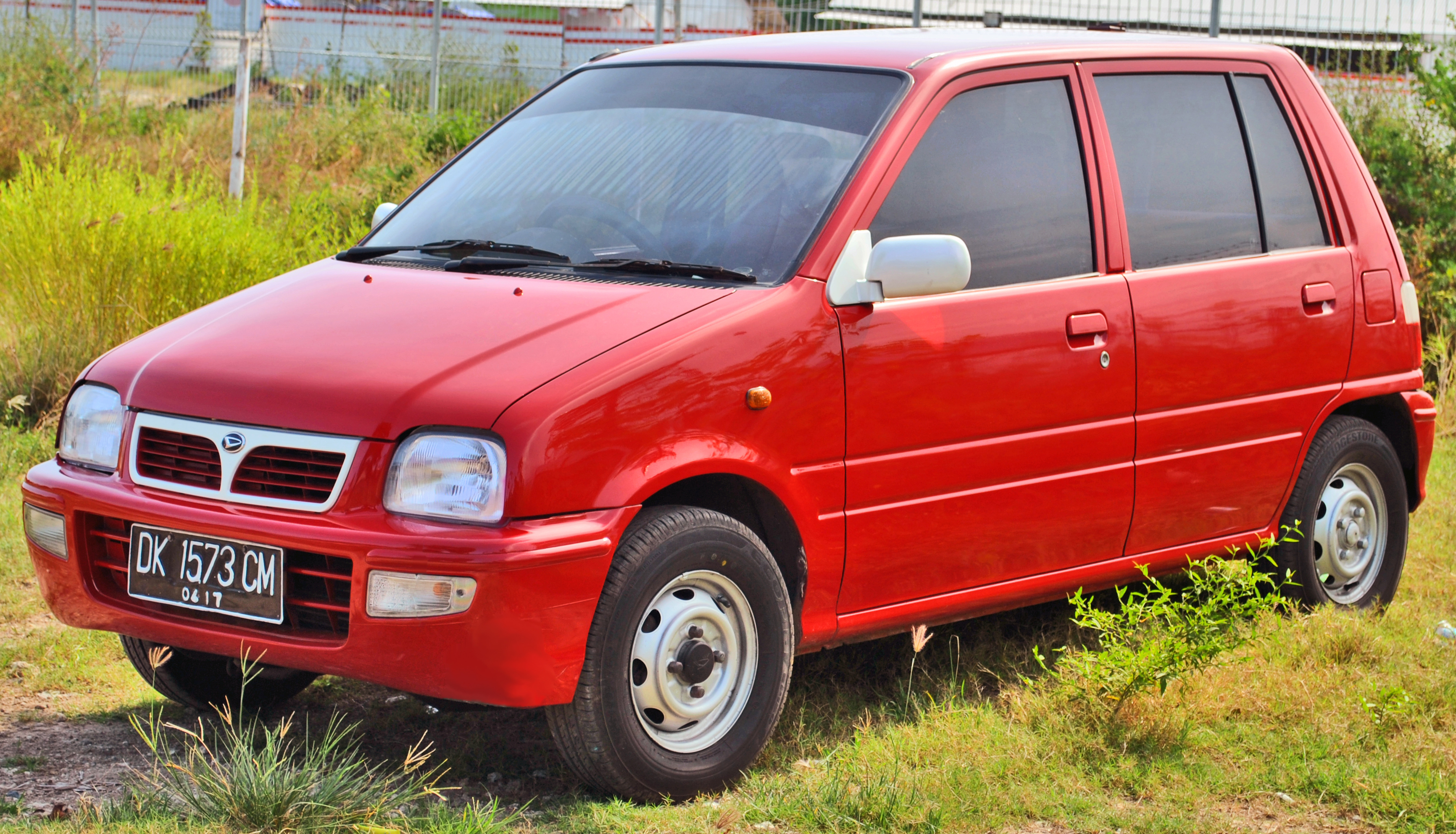
2001–2003 Daihatsu Ceria

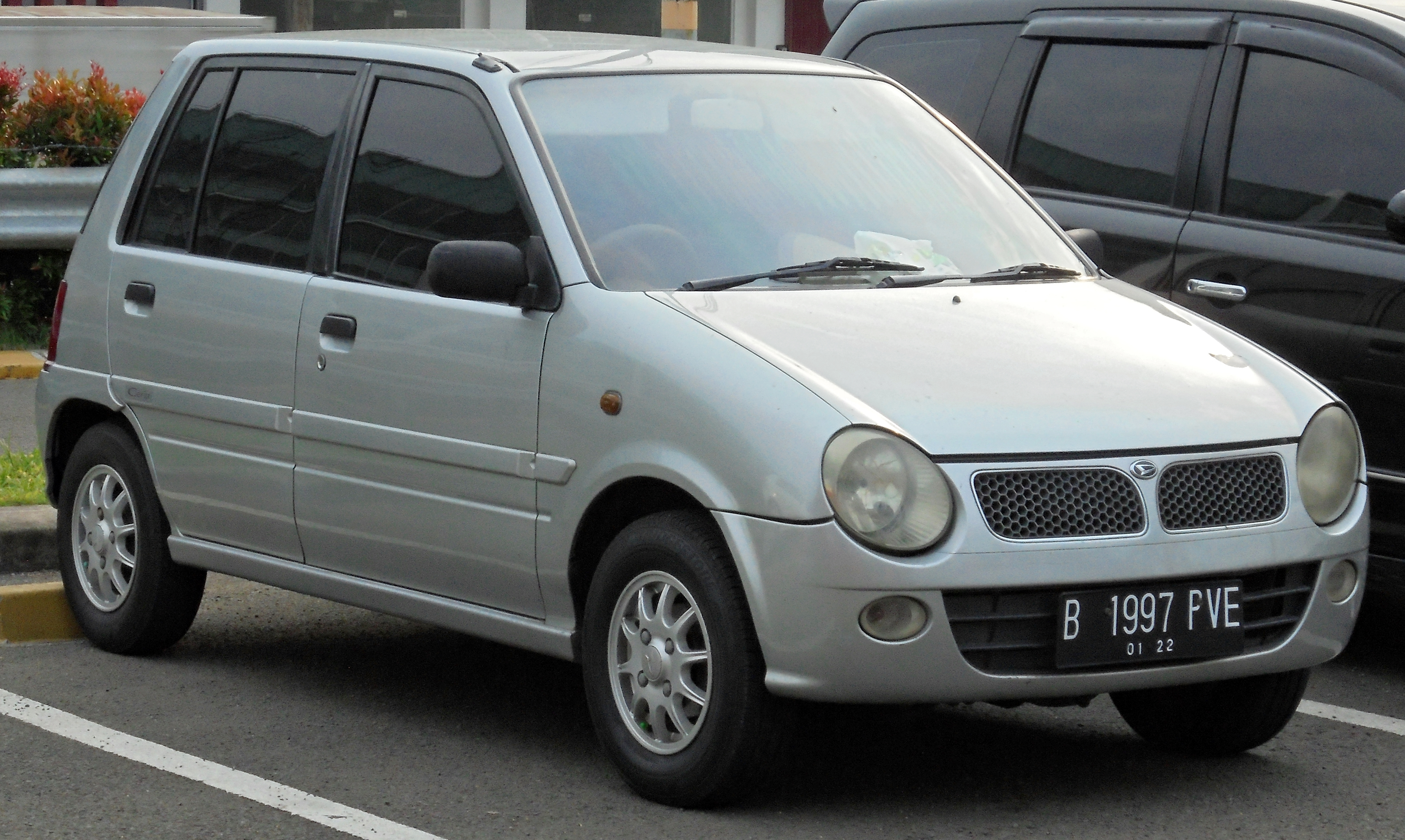
2003–2006 Daihatsu Ceria

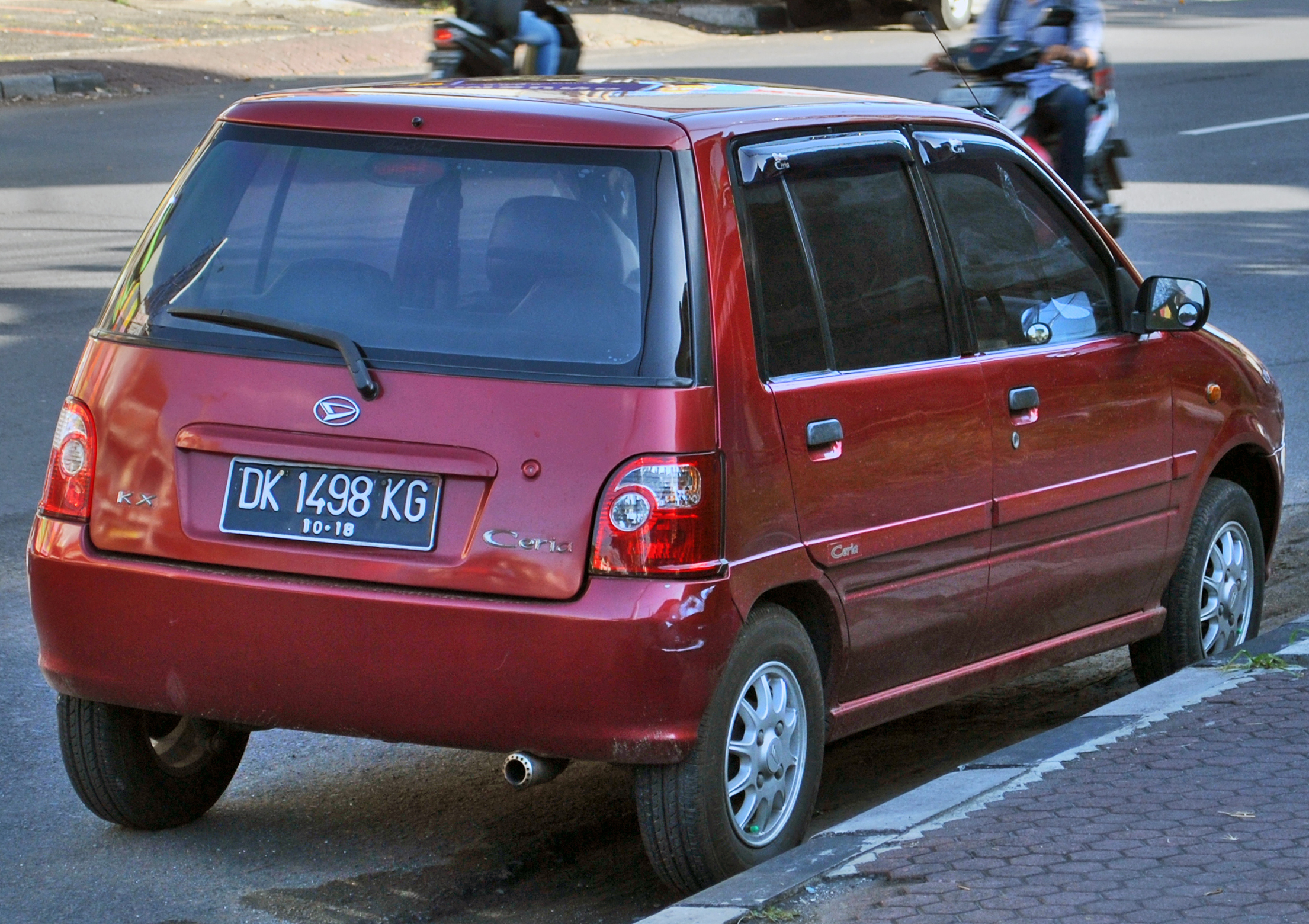
2003–2006 Daihatsu Ceria
