= Perodua Viva =

Malaysian city car

Perodua Viva (L251)
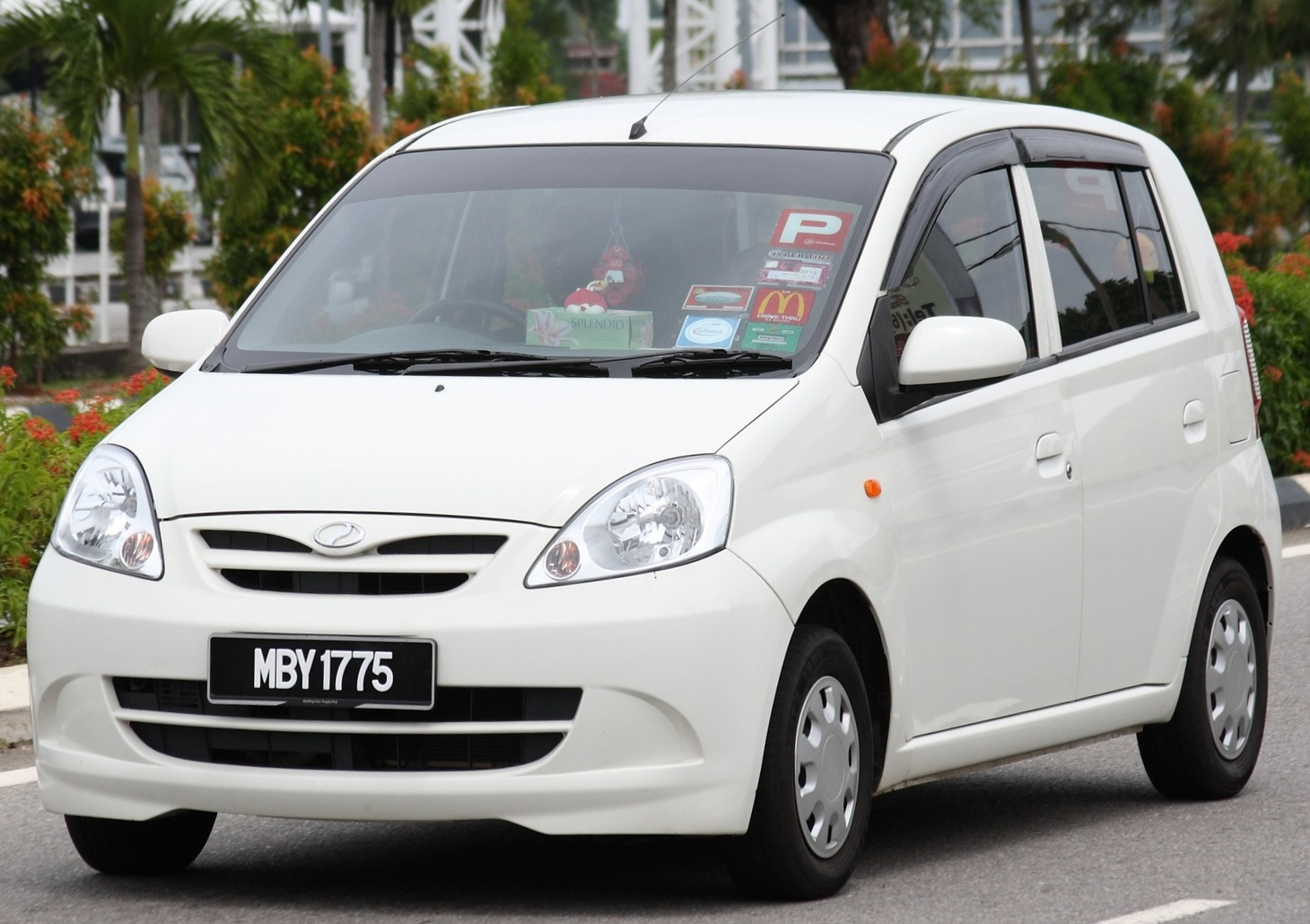

Overview
- Manufacturer: Perodua
- Production: May 2007 – August 2014
- Assembly: Malaysia: Rawang, Selangor

Body and chassis
- Class: City car
- Body style: 5-door hatchback
- Layout: Front-engine, front-wheel-drive
- Related: Daihatsu Mira (L250)

Powertrain
- Engine: Petrol: 0.7 L EF-VE DVVT DOHC I3; 0.8 L ED-VE DVVT DOHC I3; 1.0 L EJ-VE DVVT DOHC I3
- Transmission: 5-speed manual; 4-speed automatic

Dimensions
- Wheelbase: 2,390 mm (94.1 in)
- Length: 3,575 mm (140.7 in)
- Width: 1,475 mm (58.1 in)
- Height: 1,530 mm (60.2 in)
- Curb weight: 660 cc: 755 kg (1,664 lb); 850 cc: 765 kg (1,687 lb); 1000 cc SX: 785 kg (1,731 lb); 1000 cc EZ: 790 kg (1,742 lb); 1000 cc SXi: 795 kg (1,753 lb); 1000 cc EZi - 800 kg (1,764 lb)

Chronology
- Predecessor: Perodua Kancil; Perodua Kelisa
- Successor: Perodua Axia

The Perodua Viva is a city car manufactured by Malaysian automaker Perodua since 10 May 2007. At launch, Perodua marketed the Viva as a Kelisa replacement only. Later in the Viva's life, with the introduction of the 660 BX variant, the Viva finally replaced the Kancil. The Perodua Viva is based on the sixth generation Daihatsu Mira (L250). The name "Viva" is derived from the Italian word viva, meaning "long live".

== History ==
=== Pre-launch ===
The Perodua Viva was previewed by the XX06 Concept Car shown during the KL International Motor Show 2006.

=== 2007 ===
The Viva was launched on 10 May 2007 with six variant: 660cc EX (manual), 850cc EX (manual), 1.0L SX (manual), 1.0L EZ (automatic), 1.0l SXi (manual) and 1.0l EZi (automatic). The SX and EZ variants were marketed as "Standard" while the SXi and EZi variants were denoted "Premium". 5 color choices were available at launch with an additional 2 color choices added in September 2007.

=== 2009 ===
On 20 July 2009, a 660 BX (manual) variant was added as the new base model and as the replacement for the Perodua Kancil. Compared to the 660 EX (manual) variant, notable differences included the omission of an audio player + speakers and an alarm system with central locking.

On 23 July 2009, 'Elite' variants were introduced as new range topping variants replacing the 1.0 Standard and Premium variants with the Elite MT (manual), Elite AT (automatic) and Elite EZi (automatic) respectably. Elite variants featured redesigned front bumpers integrating fog lamps, chrome door handles, altered rear bumpers featuring honeycomb grille, bonnet with bulge down the centre and a different design for the 14" alloy wheels.

A 1.0 (automatic) variant was also introduced silently featuring identical specifications to the 850 EX apart from the transmission and powertrain while the 660 EX (manual) variant gained body colour bumpers (previously material colour) and a CD player (replacing the cassette player from before).

=== 2010 ===
The 'Elite Exclusive Edition' was introduced in November 2010 and was positioned between the Elite and Elite EZi variants featuring leather upholstery, a unique exterior colour option and wheels finished in different shade.

=== 2012 ===
In July 2012, all Viva models including the 660 BX came as standard with 2 SRS airbags which were able previously only on the EZi models.

=== 2013 ===
In March 2013, the Viva 1.0 S (automatic) variant was launched. Compared to the 1.0 (automatic) variant which it replaced, extra kit included seat height adjuster, under seat tray, seat back pockets, driver's vanity mirror and a stereo with MP3/WMA support. Additionally, material colour (unpainted) gear shift bezel and centre cluster, and "medium grade" fabric seats was upgraded to silver painted finish and "high grade" fabric respectively.

Alongside, the Viva 660 EX (manual) and Viva Elite EZi (automatic) variants were quietly discontinued (price list removed from Perodua's website) in March 2013.

=== 2014 ===
Following the launch of the Perodua Axia on 15 September 2014, the Viva remained in production in a sole, 850 (manual) variant.

=== 2015 ===
The Viva was removed from Perodua's website between March and April 2015.

non-Elite variants exterior
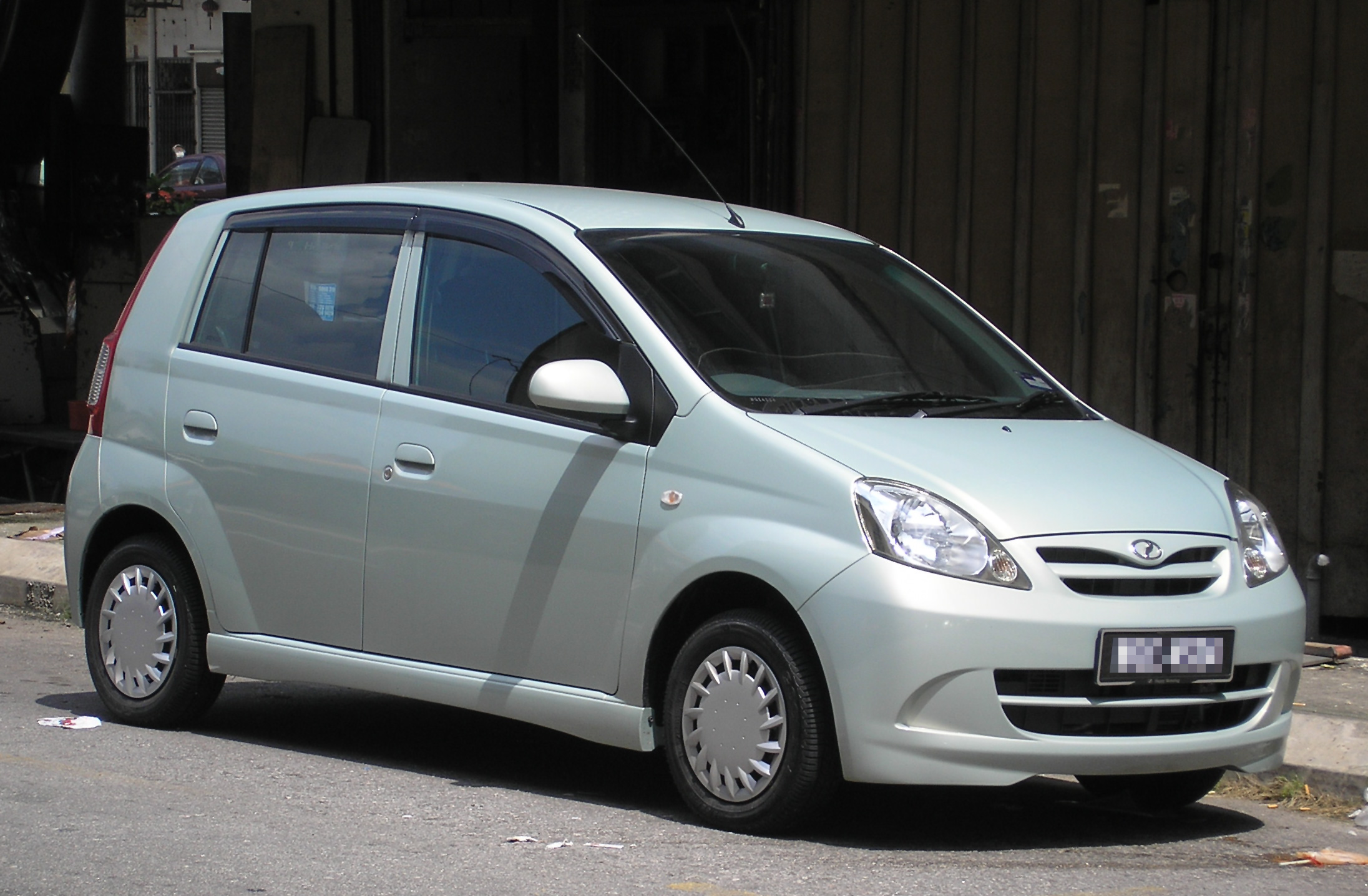
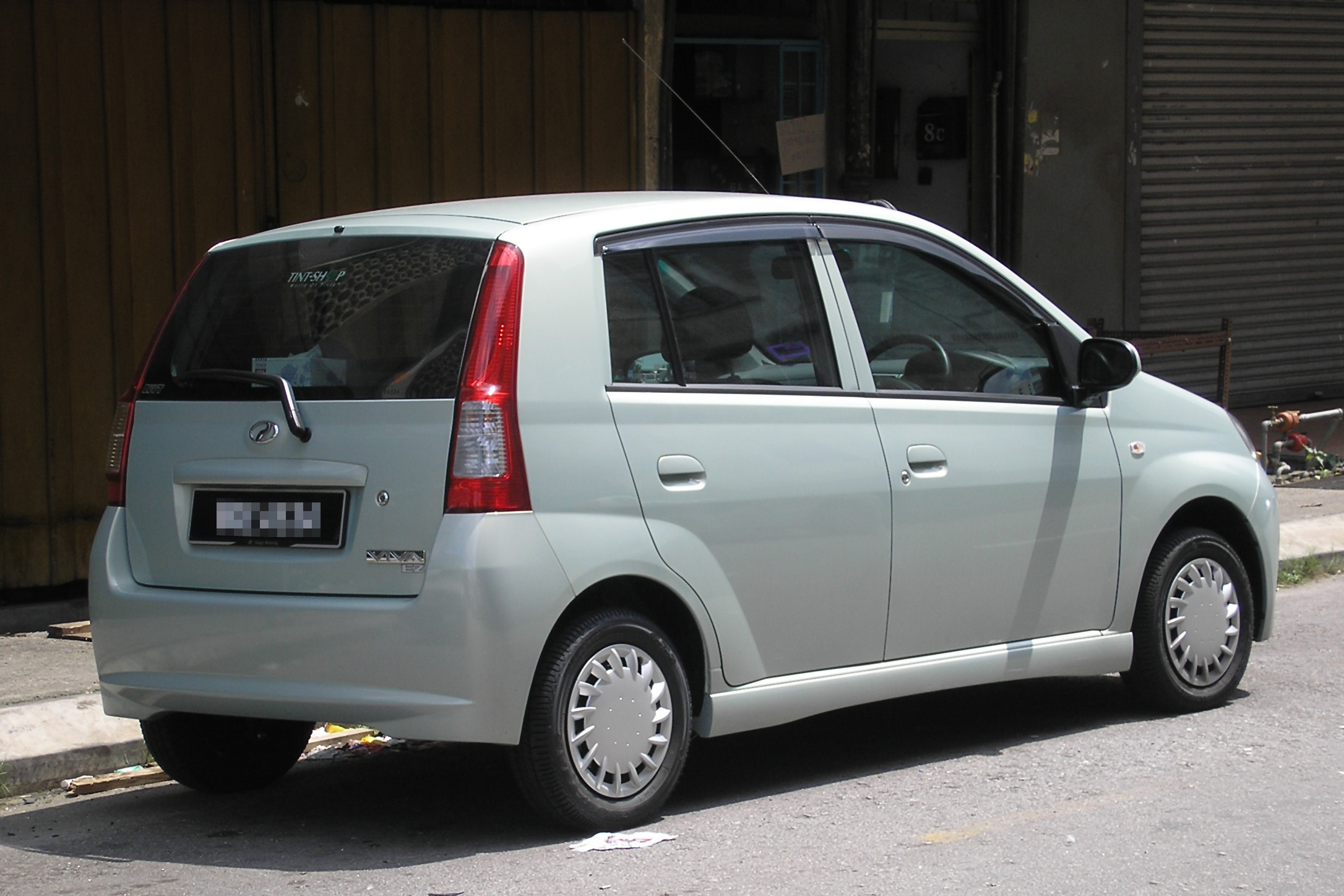
1.0 EZ (automatic) variant
Elite variants exterior
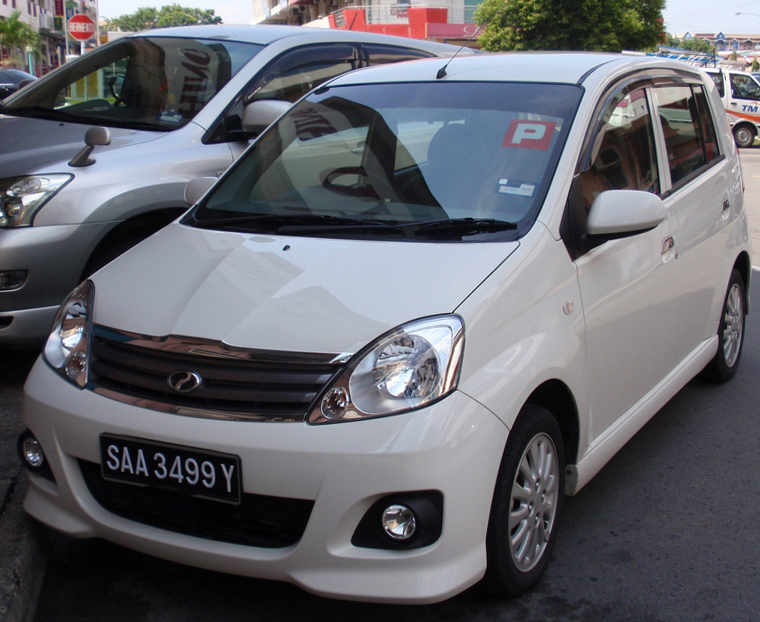
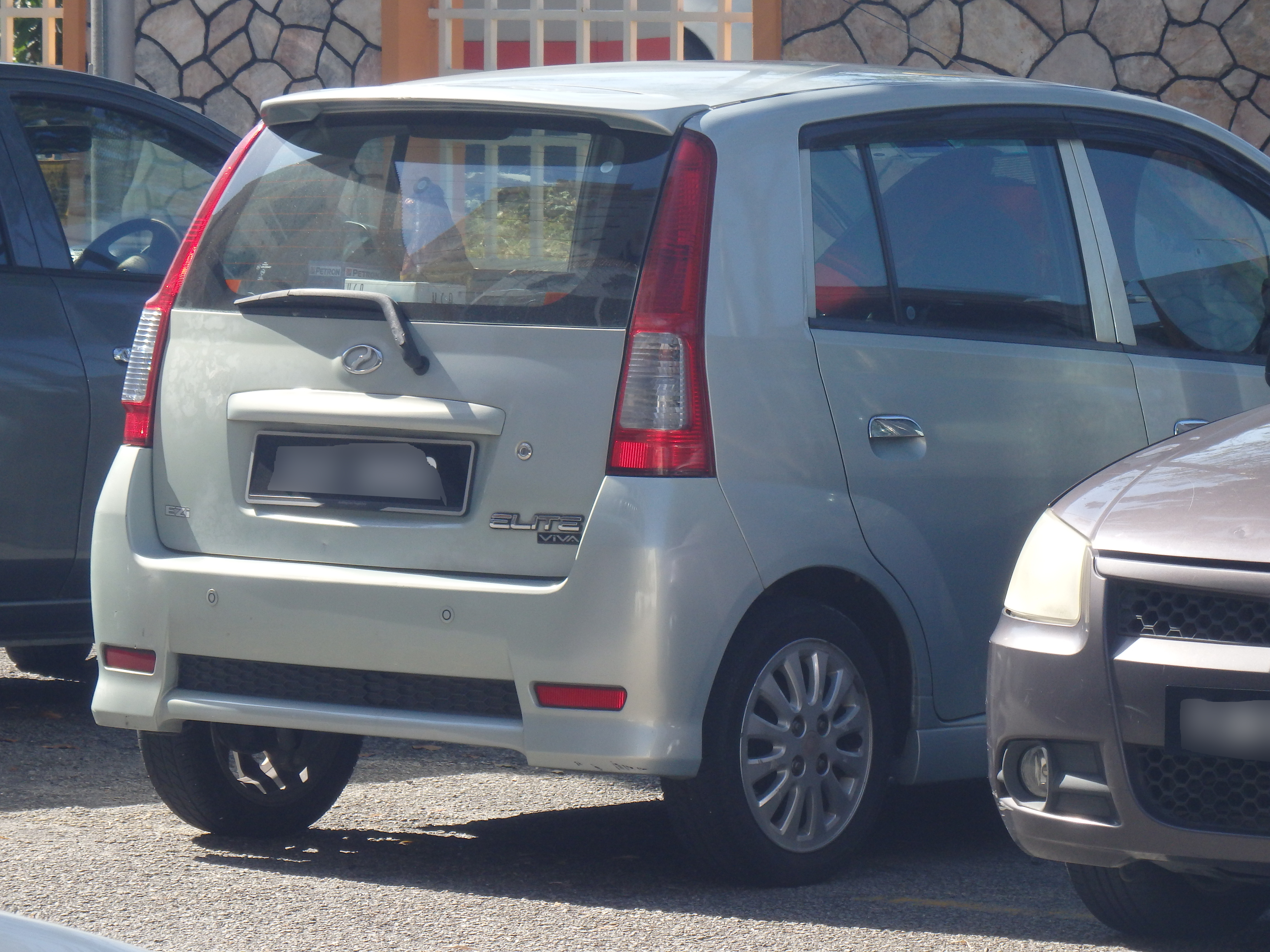

== Specifications ==
The suspension is typical of small hatchbacks with MacPherson struts in front located by an L-shaped lower arm. At the rear, Viva is fitted with a torsion beam axle and trailing arms. The suspension geometry has been optimised for better steering response and ride comfort. The 1000 cc models have power-assisted steering, optional auto transmission and also a front stabilizer. The 660 cc and 850 cc are barebones basic models, devoid of power steering and auto transmission.

=== Exterior ===
The overall height is 1530mm and the wheelbase is 2390mm. As the Viva is based on Daihatsu Mira, a kei car, it has a compact exterior dimensions and a small turning radius.

=== Interior ===
The maximum interior length is 1845mm and the maximum interior height is 1250mm. The boot capacity with the rear seats folded up is 149 liters while with the rear seats down, the boot capacity is 449 liters. The Perodua Viva interior features 5 seatbelts. 4 being three-point seatbelts while the center seat for the rear bench is only a two-point seatbelt.

=== Safety ===
Certain models had anti-locking braking system (ABS) with electronic brake distribution (EBD) and brake assist (BA) and dual supplemental restraint system (SRS) airbags. Additionally, the Perodua Viva featured a collapsible steering shaft mechanism. From July 2012 onwards, dual supplemental restraint system (SRS) airbags and seat belt pretensioners were made standard on all variants to comply with newer governmental regulations. One can identify a Viva without airbags and ones with airbags quite easily by referring to the steering wheel. If the steering wheel has the Perodua logo chromed instead of moulded and there's additional silver trim, then there's airbags.

=== Powertrain ===
The Viva comes with 3-cylinder engine choices: 660 cc, 850 cc and 1000 cc. They are familiar engines but updated with modern technology such as DVVT (Dynamic Variable Valve Timing) and EFI, and they all have twin overhead camshafts to provide even stronger low-speed pulling power, resulting in fewer gearchanges, yet also manages to increase top end power. Other innovations include a resin port intake manifold and a head cover incorporating an air-cleaner casing.

- EF-VE 660 (659 cc) – 35 kW (48 PS; 47 bhp) at 7200 rpm, 58 N⋅m (43 lb⋅ft) at 4400 rpm also used in Daihatsu Hijet
- ED-VE 850 (847 cc) – 39 kW (53 PS; 52 bhp) at 6000 rpm, 76 N⋅m (56 lb⋅ft) at 4000 rpm which is developed from the engine first introduced in 1986 for export versions of the Daihatsu Mira
- EJ-VE 1000 (989 cc) – 45 kW (61 PS; 60 bhp) at 6000 rpm, 90 N⋅m (66 lb⋅ft) at 3600 rpm also used in some versions of Daihatsu Sirion and Perodua Myvi

Fuel economy varies from 15.1 km/l (42.6 mpg) for EJ-VE automatic model, 17.5km/l (49.4mpg) for EJ-VE manual model, 17.4km/l (49.1mpg) for ED-VE.manual model & 18.7 km/L (52.8 mpg) for EF-VE manual model. For the 1 litre manual the 0–100 km/h time is about 12.8 seconds. The engine torque band is not particularly peaky and timing it takes to hit 70 km/h (43 mph) is good. It may be pushed to 130 km/h (81 mph) without much effort. However the engine drones at such speeds. Top speed is around 160 km/h (99 mph).

== Export ==
The Perodua Viva was exported to Sri Lanka, Brunei, Nepal, Mauritius and Singapore.

In August 2008, the Perodua Viva was officially launched in Sri Lanka available with the same six variants as in the Malaysian market.

Between 2010 and 2014, Econ Motors Sdn Bhd (Perodua's then-distributor in Brunei) launched the Viva in the single BX variant, with the 660 cc engine and 5-speed manual. In Brunei, the Viva came with body-coloured bumpers, black mirror caps, radio player with two front speakers, remote key lock, and with available exterior colours of Ivory White, Ebony Black, or Glittering Silver.

== Sales ==
Year	Malaysia (Note: Figures based on registration)
2007	46,217
2008	67,582
2009	67,981
2010	69,045
2011	60,675
2012	56,586
2013	51,155
2014	28,805
2015	19

== Awards and accolades ==
- Winner of Value-for-Money Car of the Year (1.3L and Below) Award 2008-2014 - FROST & SULLIVAN 2014 BEST PRACTICES AWARD
- Winner of Asian Auto Bosch Fuel Efficiency Awards 2008 (Compact City Cars Category)
- Recognized in The Malaysia Book of Records “Most Fuel Economy Challenge”
- Winner of Supermini Category - AUTOCAR ASEAN AWARDS 2007

== Reception ==
Motoring Magazine Singapore in the August 2008 issue reviewed a 1.0 EZi variant and mentioned that it was "good value-for-money", able to "fit four adults comfortably", scores well with practicality but could do better with higher quality of materials and a quieter engine.

Sgcarmart.com in September 2009 reviewed the same 1.0 EZi variant as motoring magazine in their August 2008 issue and mentioned that maintenance should be cheap. However, the reviewer also pointed out shortcomings in terms of "build quality, ride comfort and performance".
