= Perodua Kelisa =

Malaysian city car

Perodua Kelisa (L700)
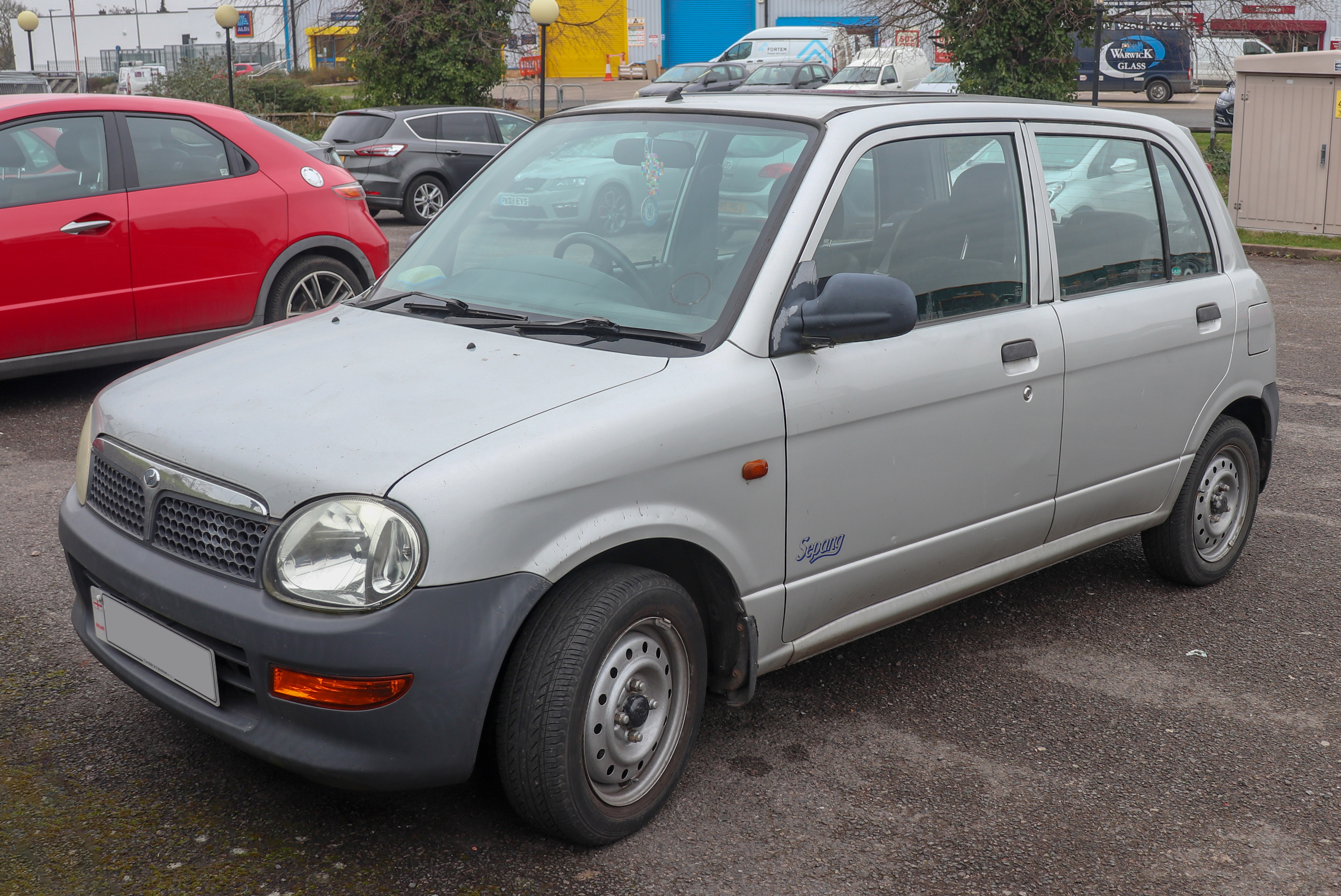

Overview
- Manufacturer: Perodua
- Production: 2001–2007
- Assembly: Malaysia: Rawang, Selangor

Body and chassis
- Class: City car
- Body style: 5-door hatchback
- Related: Daihatsu Mira (L700); Daihatsu Mira Gino (L700)

Powertrain
- Engine: Petrol: 0.8 L ED-DE DOHC I3; 1.0 L EJ-DE DOHC I3
- Transmission: 5-speed manual; 4-speed automatic

Dimensions
- Wheelbase: 2,345 mm (92.3 in)
- Length: 3,490 mm (137.4 in)
- Width: 1,490 mm (58.7 in)
- Height: 1,420 mm (55.9 in)
- Curb weight: 771 to 806 kg (1,700 to 1,777 lb)

Chronology
- Predecessor: Perodua Kancil
- Successor: Perodua Viva

The Perodua Kelisa is a city car from Malaysian automaker Perodua. It was launched in 2001 as the successor to the Perodua Kancil. The Kelisa was sold alongside the older Kancil, and both were eventually replaced by the Perodua Viva in 2007.

== History ==
The Kelisa was, in all its releases, based on a fifth-generation Daihatsu Mira (L700) and some hints of the Nissan Micra (K11), and is named after the arowana fish native to Malaysia (ikan kelisa).

As Perodua has sold its vehicles in the United Kingdom since 1997, the Kelisa was introduced into the country in 2002 as a replacement to the Nippa, a rebadged Kancil. Like its predecessor, the Kelisa was the cheapest new car on sale in the United Kingdom, starting at under £5,000.

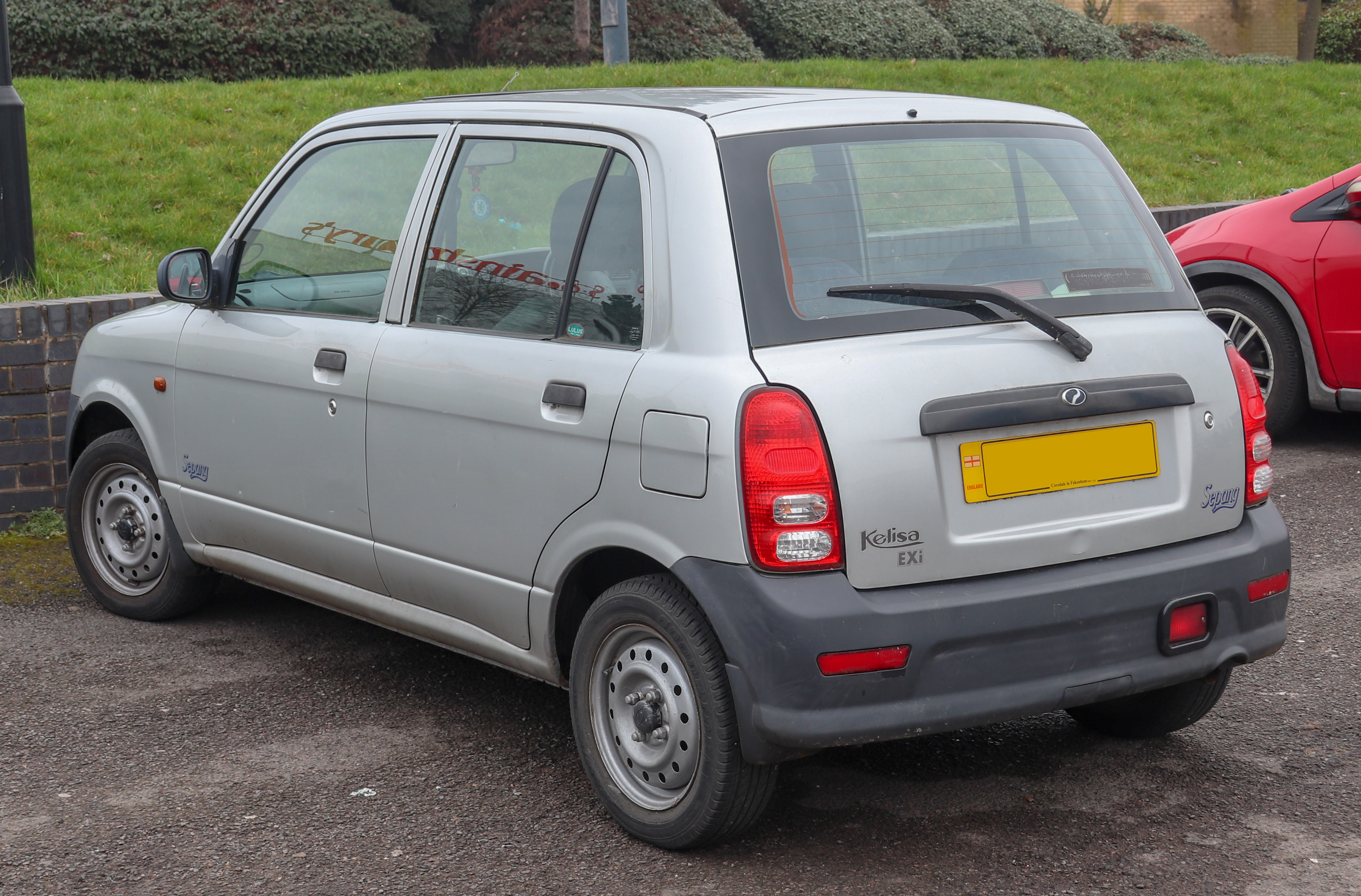
Perodua Kelisa (rear)

In 2002, the Kelisa Limited Edition was launched distinguable by a two-tone paintwork, leather seats and leather wrapped steering wheel.

The Perodua Kelisa launched with three variants: EX, GX and EZ. When the facelift launched in 2003, the models remained the same: EX, GX and EZ. A limited edition Kelisa, based on the original variant, prominently sports two toned colored paintwork and minor interior modifications.

On 21 October 2003, Perodua launched the facelifted version of the Perodua Kelisa. This model differed from the pre-facelift version with a new front honeycomb grille, a new lower front bumper featuring amber front turn signal lights, a new lower rear bumper with a reflector, a new side protector molding, a new rear wiper, a center-position roof antenna, a new meter panel, new design sports rims for the EX model, and new design wheel caps for the GX model. While the pre-facelift models used 13" wheels, the facelifted model utilized 14" wheels.

It was available in four colors: Kristal White, Sparkling Silver, Millenia Gold and Gemilang Blue. Throughout Spring 2004, Perodua replaced the EX variant with the 850 EX variant and rebranded the GX to 1000 GX and EX to 1000 EX.Other changes different gear ratios for the manual transmissions and overall dimensions/size.

The Limited Edition returned in 2004.

Between August and November 2004, Perodua launched the Kelisa SE (Special Edition). It was available with both manual (GXS) and automatic (EZS) transmissions. These special edition Kelisa's featured clear lens for the front and side fender mounted turn signals, front seats with fixed headrest, painted center cluster, leather wrapped steering wheel and a bodykit consisting of a rear spoiler, side, front and rear skirts.

In 2006, Perodua launched the Kelisa Imago. It was available with both manual (GXQ) and automatic (EZQ) transmissions. The changes compared to the other Kelisa variants included a silver painted center cluster (including astray), leather seats with "imago" embroidery, leather-wrapped steering wheel, clear side and front turn signals, sporty spoiler, chrome door handles & door lock and a modern Metallic Pearl Jade finish — a light double metallic color.

The SE and Imago editions used the same alloy wheel designs as the regular EZ variant and do note that non-SE and Imago Kelisa's had yellow lenses for the front and side fender-mounted turn signals.

In February 2007, selected Kelisa models also came with built in Bluetooth technology.

== List of models ==
=== Malaysia ===
Throughout the Kelisa's production run, various models were known under various other model names. However, these other names were mainly only used in marketing (price lists, brochures, stickers on the boot and more) as the vehicles actually registration paper would contain the actual model name.

Year	Model	Also known as	Successor	Transmission
2001–2004	EX	-	850 EX	Manual
2001–2007	GX	GZ; 1000 GX; GXi; Standard (M/T)	-	Manual
2001–2007	EZ	1000 EZ; EZi; Standard (A/T)	-	Automatic
2004–2007	850 EX	850cc (M/T)	-	Manual
2004–2007	GXS	SE; Special Edition	-	Manual
2004–2007	EZS	SE; Special Edition	-	Automatic
2002, 2004-2005	GXL	Limited Edition	-	Manual
2002, 2004-2005	EZL	Limited Edition	-	Automatic
2006–2007	GXQ	Imago	-	Manual
2006–2007	EZQ	Imago	-	Automatic

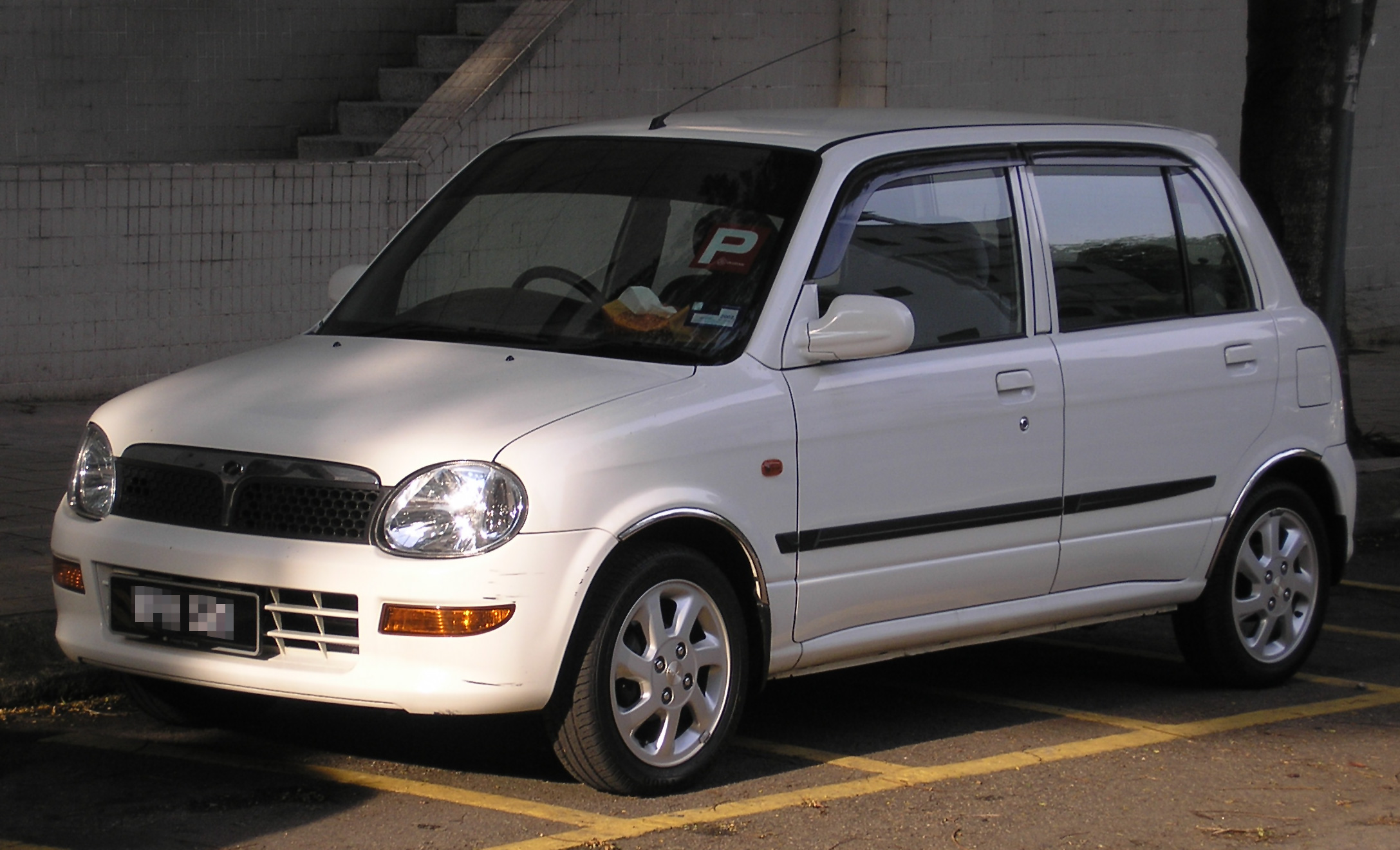
2003–2007 Perodua Kelisa EZ Facelift (front)

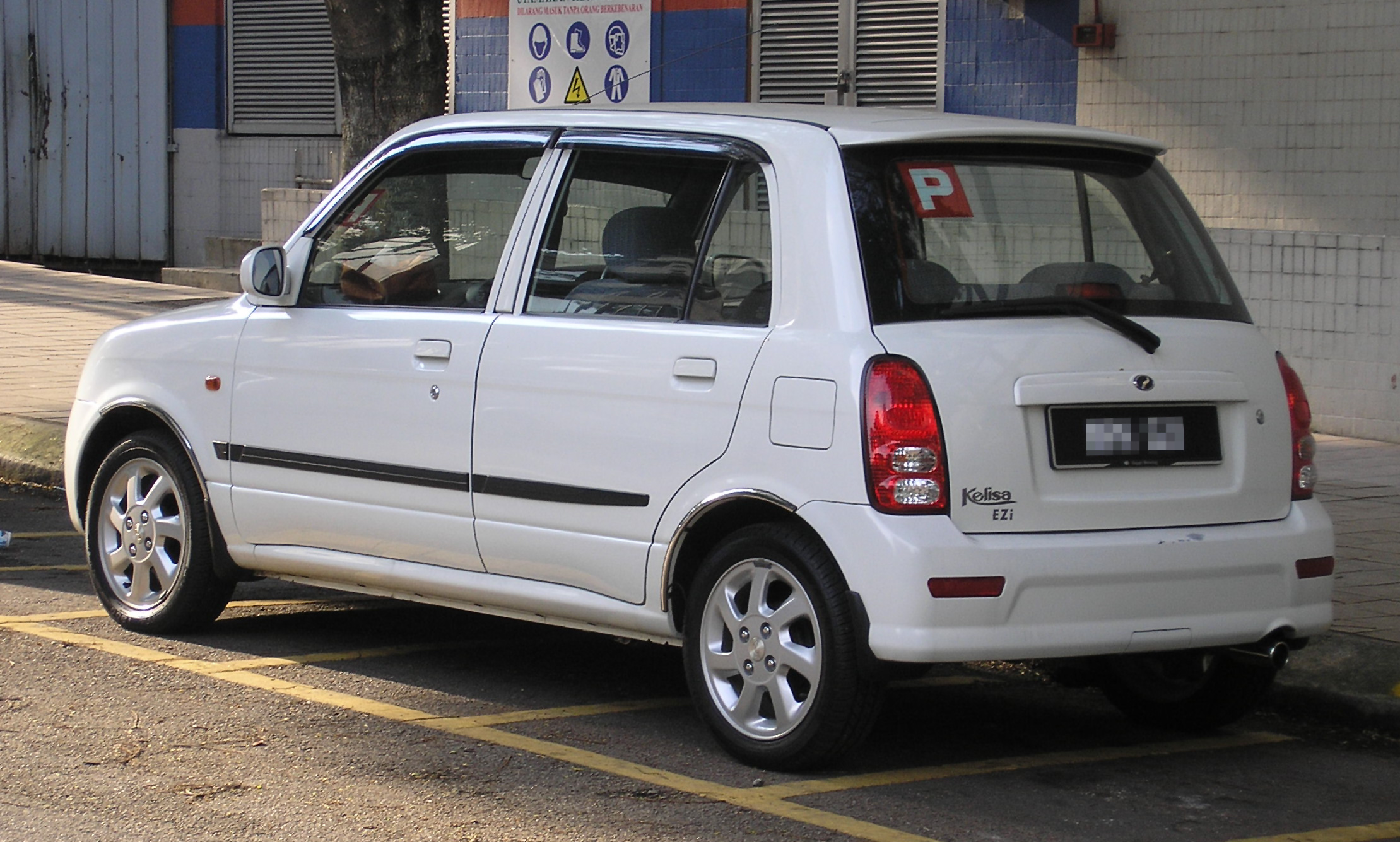
2003–2007 Perodua Kelisa EZ Facelift (rear)

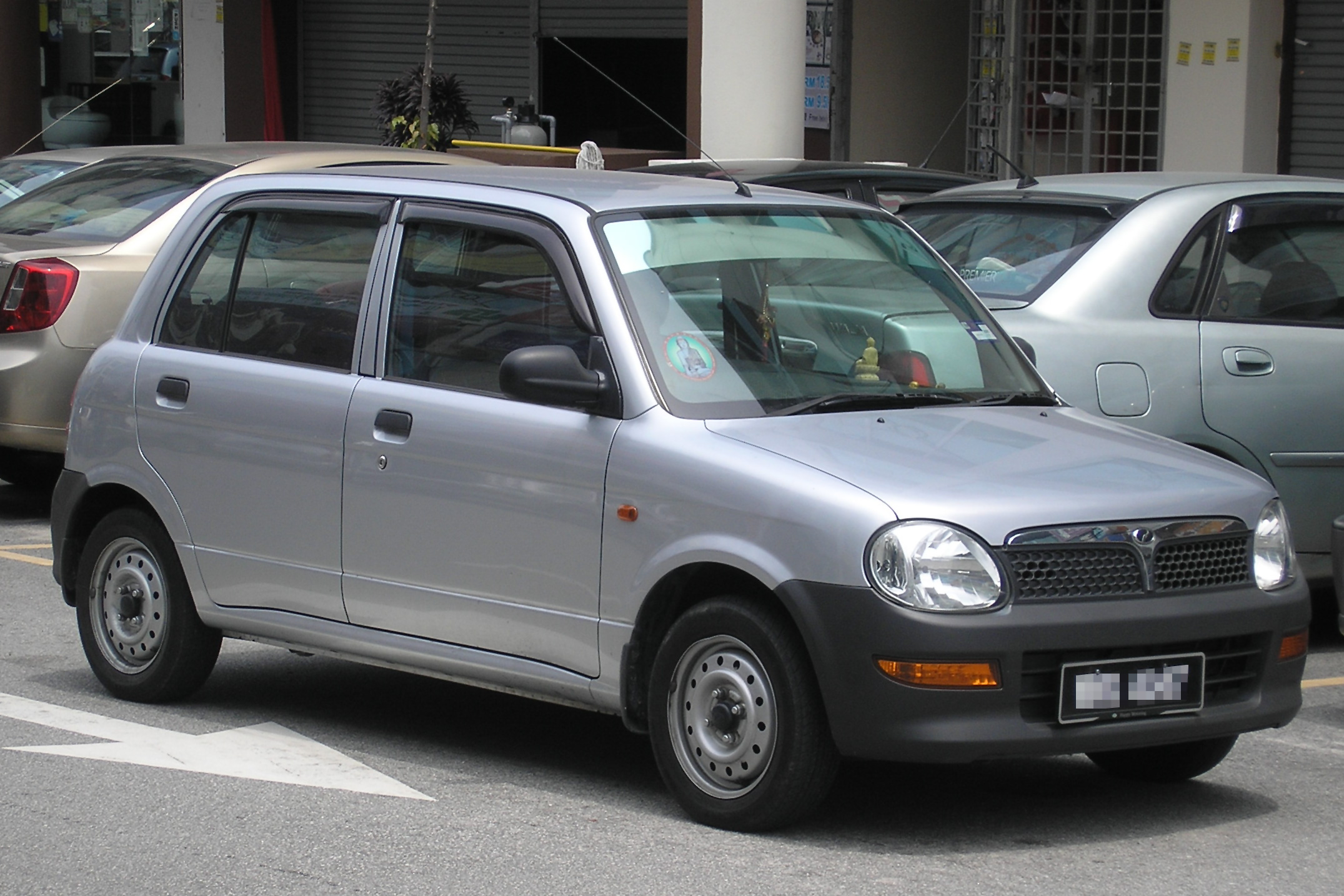
2003–2007 Perodua Kelisa EX Facelift (front)

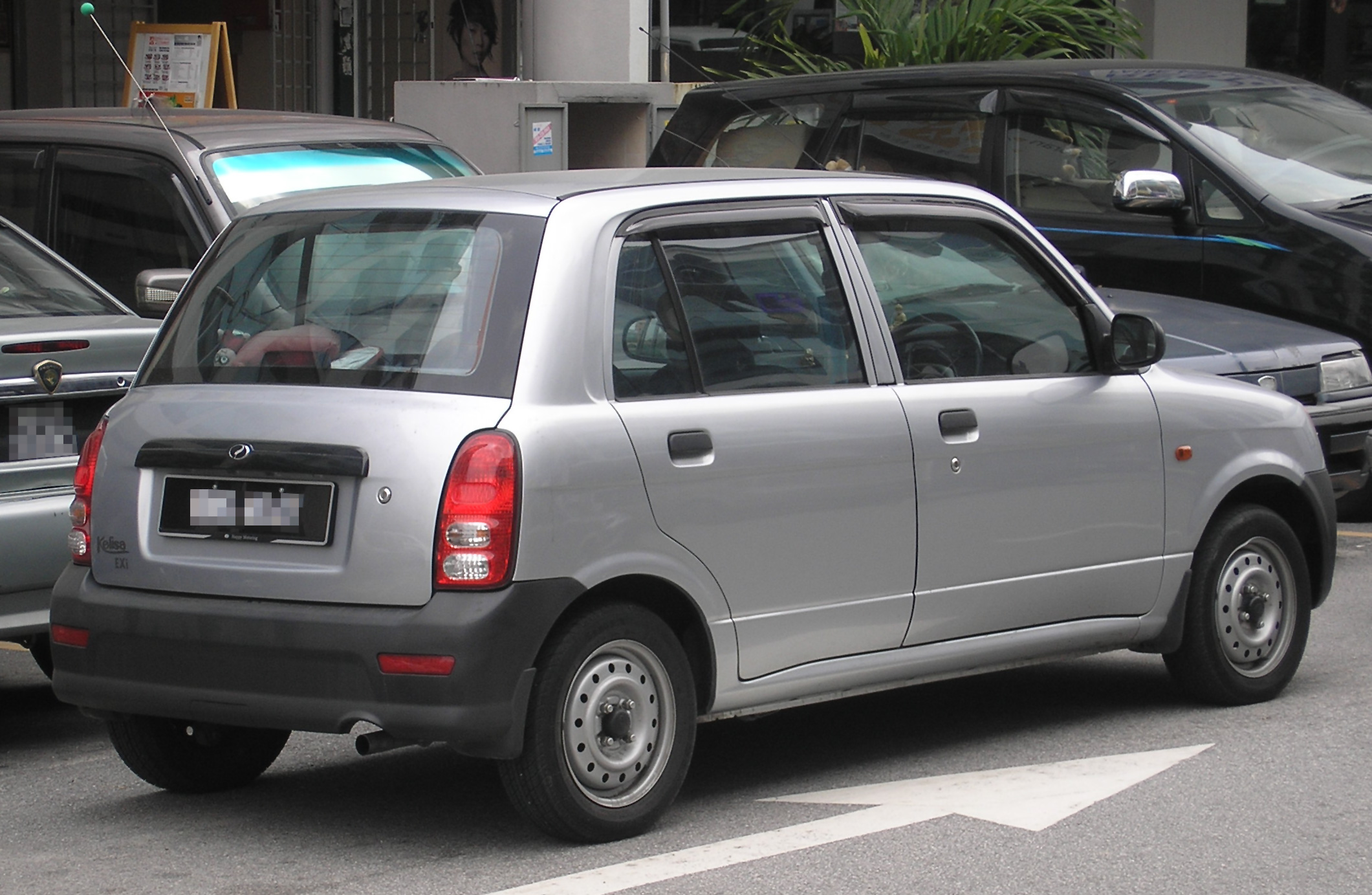
2003–2007 Perodua Kelisa EX Facelift (rear)

== Colors ==
Type	Color name	Color code	Variants	Year
Metallic	Pearl Jade	G47	Imago (GXQ & EZQ)	
Metallic	Mocca Silver	S05	GX, EZ	
Metallic	Millennia Gold	T06	GX, EZ	
Solid	Ivory White	W09	EX, GX, EZ	
Metallic	Glittering Silver	S28	EX, GX, EZ	
Metallic	Gemilang Blue	B42	GX, EZ	
	Kenari Yellow		Limited Edition (GXL & EZL)	
	Royal Blue		Limited Edition (GXL & EZL)	
Metallic	Sparkling Silver	S01	EX, GX, EZ & Limited Edition (GXL & EZL)	
Solid	Kristal White	W14	850EX, GX, EZ	
Metallic	Ozzy Orange	R53	SE (GXS & EZS)	
	Ebony Black		SE (GXS & EZS)	

== Specifications ==
Comparison of specifications (Malaysia models)
Model			EX	GX	EZ	850 EX	1000 GX	1000 EZ
Date			2001–2004			2004–2007		
Overall Length (mm)			3480			3490		
Overall Width (mm)			1490					
Overall Height (mm)			1425				1430	
Interior Length (mm)			1720					
Interior Width (mm)			1220					
Interior Height (mm)			1170					
Wheelbase (mm)			2360					
Track	Front (mm)		1300					
Track	Rear (mm)		1260					
Ground Clearance (mm)			165					
Kerb weight (kg)			775	790	795	771	801	806
Seating capacity			5					
Minimum turning radius	Tyre (m)		4.3	4.3	4.3	?		
Minimum turning radius	Body (m)		4.6	4.6	4.6	?		
Minimum turning radius	Tyre - M		?			4.3	4.5	
Engine model			EJ - DE			ED - DE		
Engine type			Water-cooled, 4 cycle, in-line 3-cylinder			Water-cooled, 4 cycle, in-line, transverse engine		
Valve mechanism			DOHC			DOHC-4 valve per cylinder		
Total displacement			989			847	989	
Bore x stroke (mm)			72 x 81			66.6 x 81	72 x 81	
Compression			10					
Maximum output			40.5 kW / 5200 rpm			36.7 kW / 5200 rpm	40.5 kW / 5200 rpm	
Maximum torque			88.3 Nm / 3600 rpm			74.4 Nm / 4000 rpm	88.3 Nm / 3600 rpm	
Fuel system			EFI					
Fuel tank capacity (liter)			40					
Clutch			Single dry plate with diaphragm spring and mechanical actuation		N/A	Single dry plate with diaphragm spring and mechanical actuation		N/A
Transmission	Type		Forward 5-speed manual, all synchromesh		Forward 4-speed full automatic	5 M/T		4 A/T
Transmission	Gear ratios	1	3.417		2.731	3.417	3.181	2.730
Transmission	Gear ratios	2	1.947		1.526	1.947	2.842	1.526
Transmission	Gear ratios	3	1.250		1.000	1.250	1.250	1.000
Transmission	Gear ratios	4	0.865		0.696	0.917	0.916	0.696
Transmission	Gear ratios	5	0.707		N/A	0.750	0.750	N/A
Transmission	Reverse		3.143		2.290	3.143	3.142	2.290
Transmission	Final gear ratio		3.938		4.439	4.643	4.266	4.439
Steering type			Manual	Power steering		Rack and pinion		
Main brakes	Front		Disc brakes with booster			Disc		
Main brakes	Rear		Drums (leading & trailing)					
Parking brake			Mechanically operating on rear wheels					
Suspension	Front		MacPherson strut with coil spring					
Suspension	Rear		3 link suspension					
Tyres			155/65R13	165/60R13	165/60R13	155/65R13	165/55R14	165/55R14

Comparing the GX and EZ variants (regardless of pre-facelift or facelift), the EZ variant had in addition to the GX variant an air ionizer, electrically adjustable side mirrors, as well as some form of hands free technology for phones coupled with a phone holder.

While the seat fabric was shared between pre-facelift GX and EZ variants, post-facelift GX and EZ variants each had unique fabric upholstery with unique fabric patterns.

== In media ==
In the second series of Top Gear, James May drove the Kelisa and was generally impressed with the car, even likening it to the original Mini. However, in Jeremy Clarkson's 2005 DVD Heaven and Hell, Clarkson bought a Perodua Kelisa EX and destroyed it by blowing it up immediately after purchasing it, in an effort to highlight aesthetic frustrations with the design.

In April 2007, Clarkson described it as the worst in the world, stating in an article "Its name was like a disease" and suggesting it was built in jungles by people who wear leaves for shoes. His comments drew criticism from the Malaysian Government, a representative of which countered by stating that no complaints had been received from any customers in the United Kingdom.

In 2023, the YouTube channel Mighty Car Mods used a Kelisa as a base car to enter the 2023 K car GLOBAL 24-hour endurance race at the Sepang International Circuit. The race features kei cars in various categories, and Mighty Car Mods fitted the Kelisa with parts from an Australian Daihatsu Cuore which they brought in two luggage bags.

== Sales ==
Year	Malaysia
2001	10,753
2002	37,099
2003	30,902
2004	30,577
2005	26,771
2006	23,619
2007	6,755
2008	76

== Awards and accolades ==
- ASEAN Auto Car Awards 2003/2004 (Compact Car category)
- NST - MasterCard Compact Car of the Year 2003
- NST Car of the Year 2002.
