= Daihatsu Boon =

Subcompact car

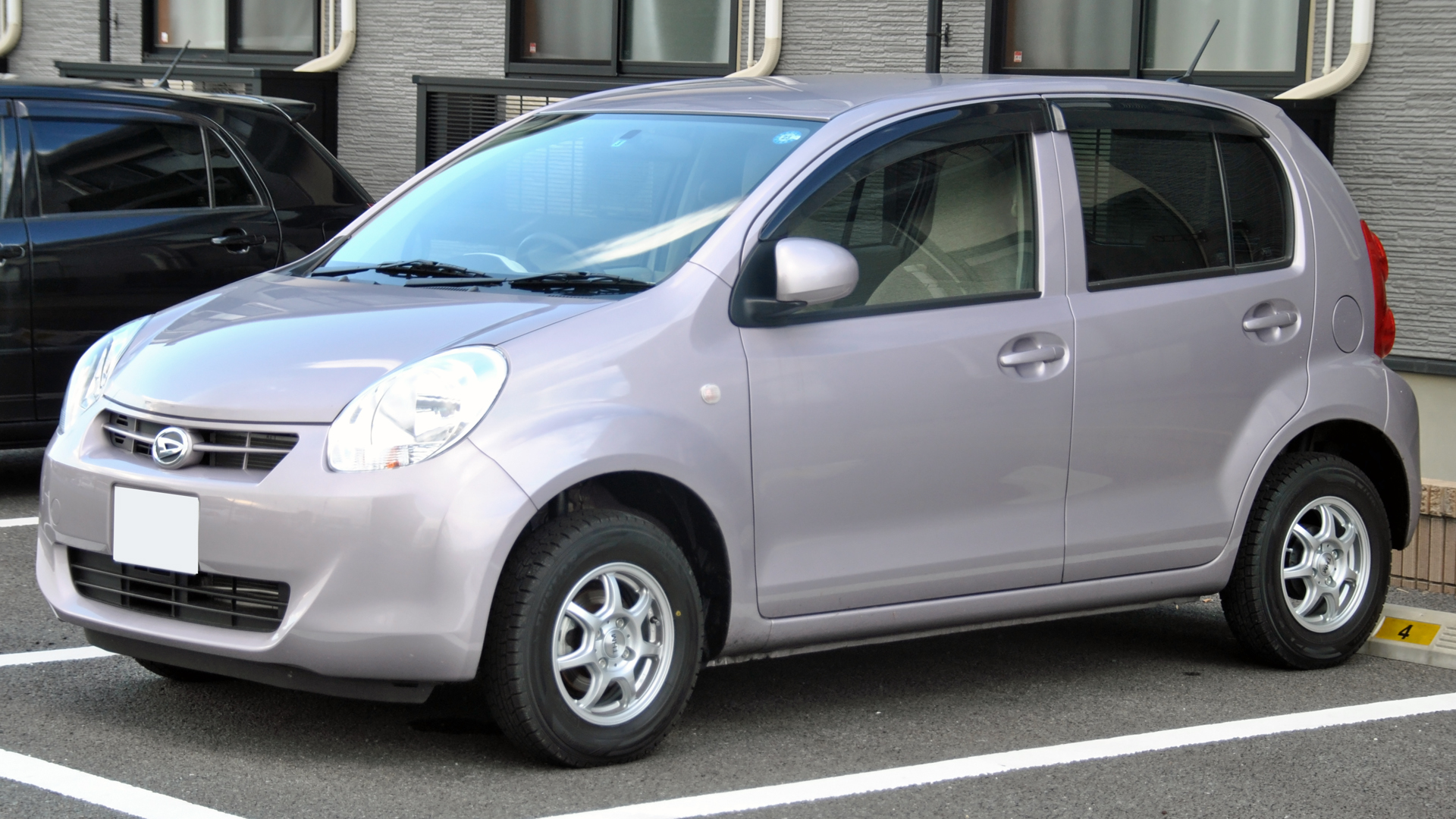
- Second-generation Daihatsu Boon (M600, Japan)

Overview
- Manufacturer: Daihatsu
- Also called: Toyota Passo (2005–2023); Daihatsu Sirion (international, 2004–2015; Indonesia, 2007–2018); Subaru Justy (2007–2011); Perodua Myvi (Malaysia, 2005–2017)
- Production: June 2004 – December 2023
- Assembly: Japan: Ikeda, Osaka (Ikeda plant)

Body and chassis
- Class: Subcompact car
- Body style: 5-door hatchback
- Layout: Front-engine, front-wheel-drive; Front-engine, four-wheel-drive

Chronology
- Predecessor: Daihatsu Storia

The Daihatsu Boon (Japanese: ダイハツ・ブーン, Hepburn: Daihatsu Būn) is a subcompact car produced by Japanese automaker Daihatsu from 2004 to 2023, and also sold under Toyota brand as the Toyota Passo (Japanese: トヨタ・パッソ, Hepburn: Toyota Passo) between 2004 and the ends of 2023. The Passo was once sold at Toyota Corolla Store Japanese dealerships until it was consolidated with other Toyota dealers in 2020.

Outside Japan, the first- and second-generation Boon is sold as the second- and third-generation Sirion. The first-generation Sirion was sold as the Storia in Japan.

According to Daihatsu, the name "Boon" is derived from the English word boon, and also inspired by the sound that Japanese children make when imitating the sound of a car, while the name "Passo" is Italian for "step". According to Toyota, the name conjures up the image of a casual and approachable car.

== First generation (M300/AC10; 2004) ==
First generation
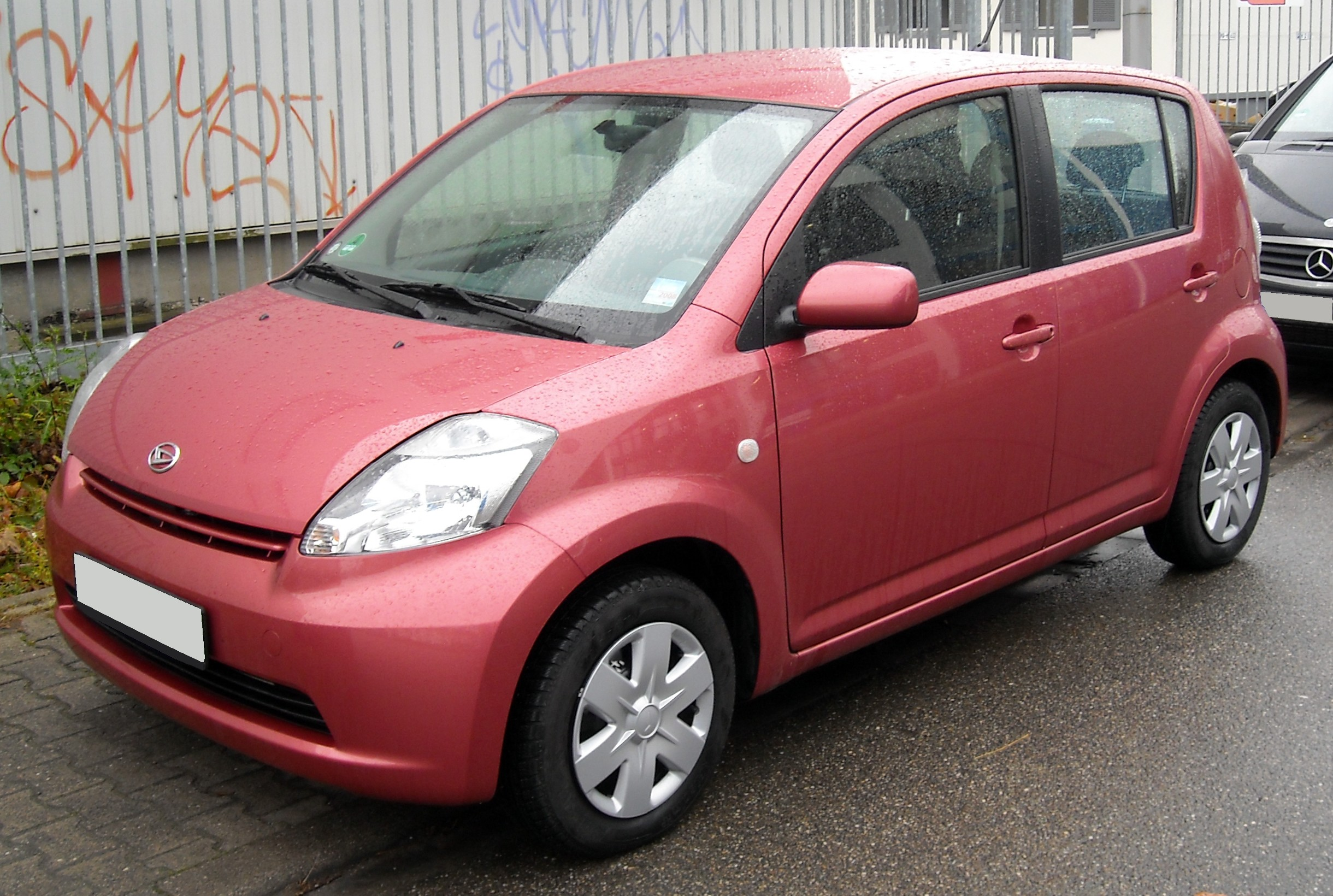
- Pre-facelift Sirion (Germany)

Overview
- Model code: M300/AC10
- Also called: Toyota Passo; Daihatsu Sirion (international, 2004–2015); Subaru Justy (2007–2011); Perodua Myvi (Malaysia and Singapore, 2005–2011)
- Production: June 2004 – February 2010 (Japan); 2004–2015 (international)
- Assembly: Japan: Ikeda, Osaka (Ikeda plant); Malaysia: Rawang, Selangor (PMSB, Perodua Myvi)
- Designer: Aiji Shimizu, Kazuki Tanaka, Michio Tada, Takumi Ichikawa and Toku Harumino (facelift)

Body and chassis
- Related: Daihatsu Coo/Materia / Toyota bB / Subaru Dex

Powertrain
- Engine: Petrol: 936 cc KJ-VET turbo I4 (Boon X4); 996 cc 1KR-FE I3; 1298 cc K3-VE I4; 1495 cc 3SZ-VE I4 (outside Japan)
- Power output: 98 kW (131 hp; 133 PS) (KJ-VET); 52 kW (70 hp; 71 PS) (1KR-FE); 64 kW (86 hp; 87 PS) (K3-VE); 80 kW (107 hp; 109 PS) (3SZ-VE)
- Transmission: 5-speed manual; 4-speed automatic

Dimensions
- Wheelbase: 2,440 mm (96.1 in)
- Length: 3,600–3,630 mm (141.7–142.9 in)
- Width: 1,665 mm (65.6 in)
- Height: 1,535–1,550 mm (60.4–61.0 in)
- Curb weight: 900–980 kg (1,984–2,161 lb)

The development for the first-generation Boon was led by Toyota chief engineer Tetsuya Tada. For the Japanese domestic market, the Boon were available with 996 cc and 1.3-litre engines. The major difference between the Japanese Boon and Sirion are automatic version where the gear-changing located beside the steering on the dashboard and the handbrake below the steering. Both the Japanese Boon and European Sirion were offered in both front-wheel drive and four-wheel drive versions. A 936 cc turbocharged version with four-wheel drive was also available, known as the Boon X4.

The Boon was designed for European tastes and the model took on a larger and stockier frame. It weighs about 940 kg (2,072 lb). With the back seats down, its luggage capacity increases from 225 L (8 cu ft) to 630 L (22 cu ft).

In early 2005, Daihatsu launched the Japanese-built second-generation Sirion in Brunei using the facility and parts from the Boon. The model was discontinued in 2010 before Daihatsu exited the Brunei market as the passenger cars market (except the commercial vehicles) in 2014 and the Sirion is replaced by the Perodua-badged Myvi, which is launched in the country since April 2016.

On 25 May 2005, Malaysian automaker Perodua launched a variant of the Boon known as the Perodua Myvi. Sporting multiple cosmetic changes, the Myvi became Perodua's best-selling car in Malaysia for 2006, 2007, 2008 and 2009. The Myvi was also exported to Singapore and the United Kingdom.

On 25 December 2006, the Boon was restyled. This version was exported to Europe as the Sirion in 2007.

In 2007, Daihatsu launched the Sirion in Indonesia using the facility and parts from the Myvi.

The Subaru Justy was unveiled at the 2007 Frankfurt Motor Show using the Boon model. It is positioned as an entry-level model in Subaru's lineup.

=== Gallery ===
==== Boon/Sirion ====
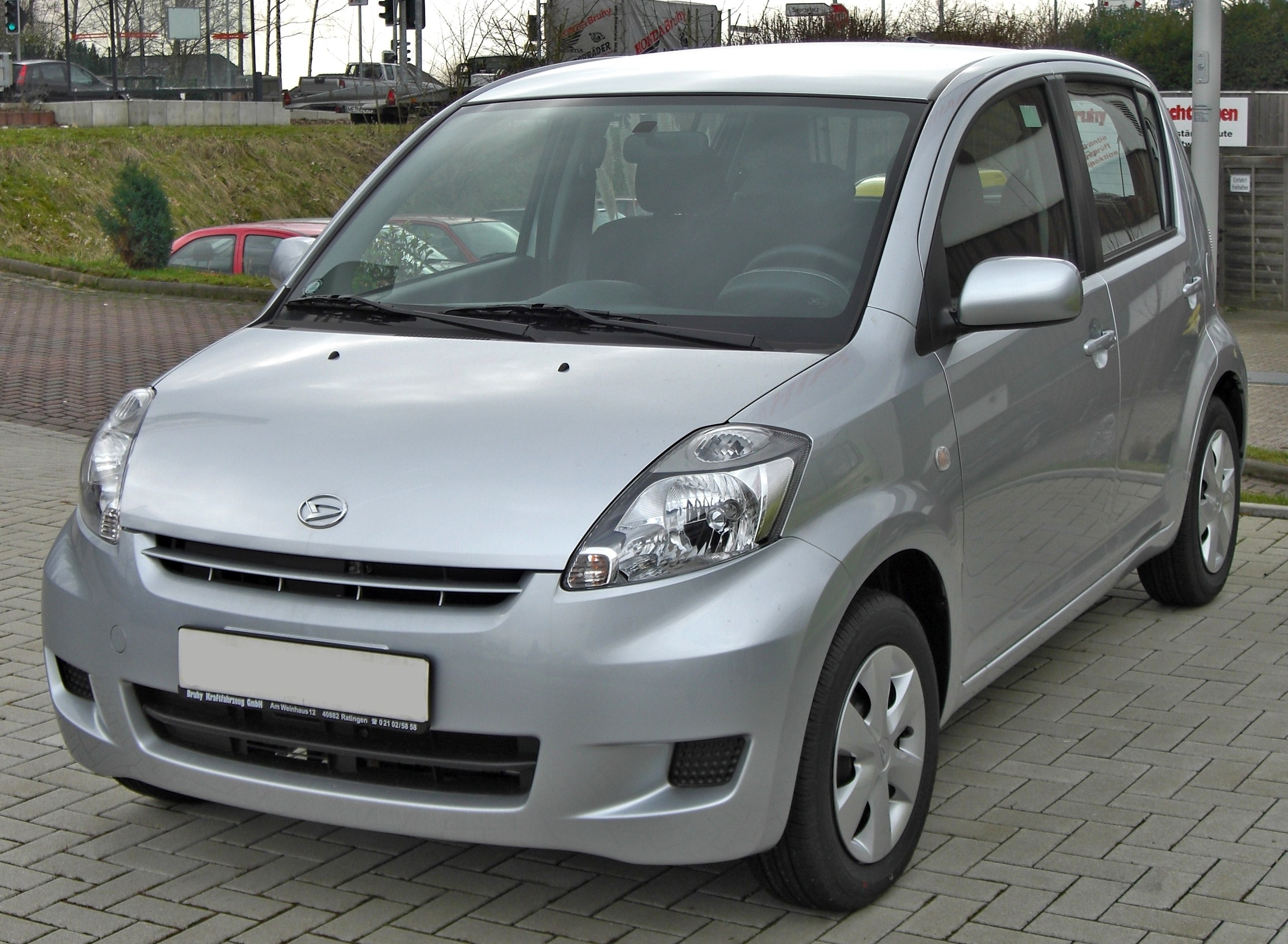
Facelift Sirion (Germany)

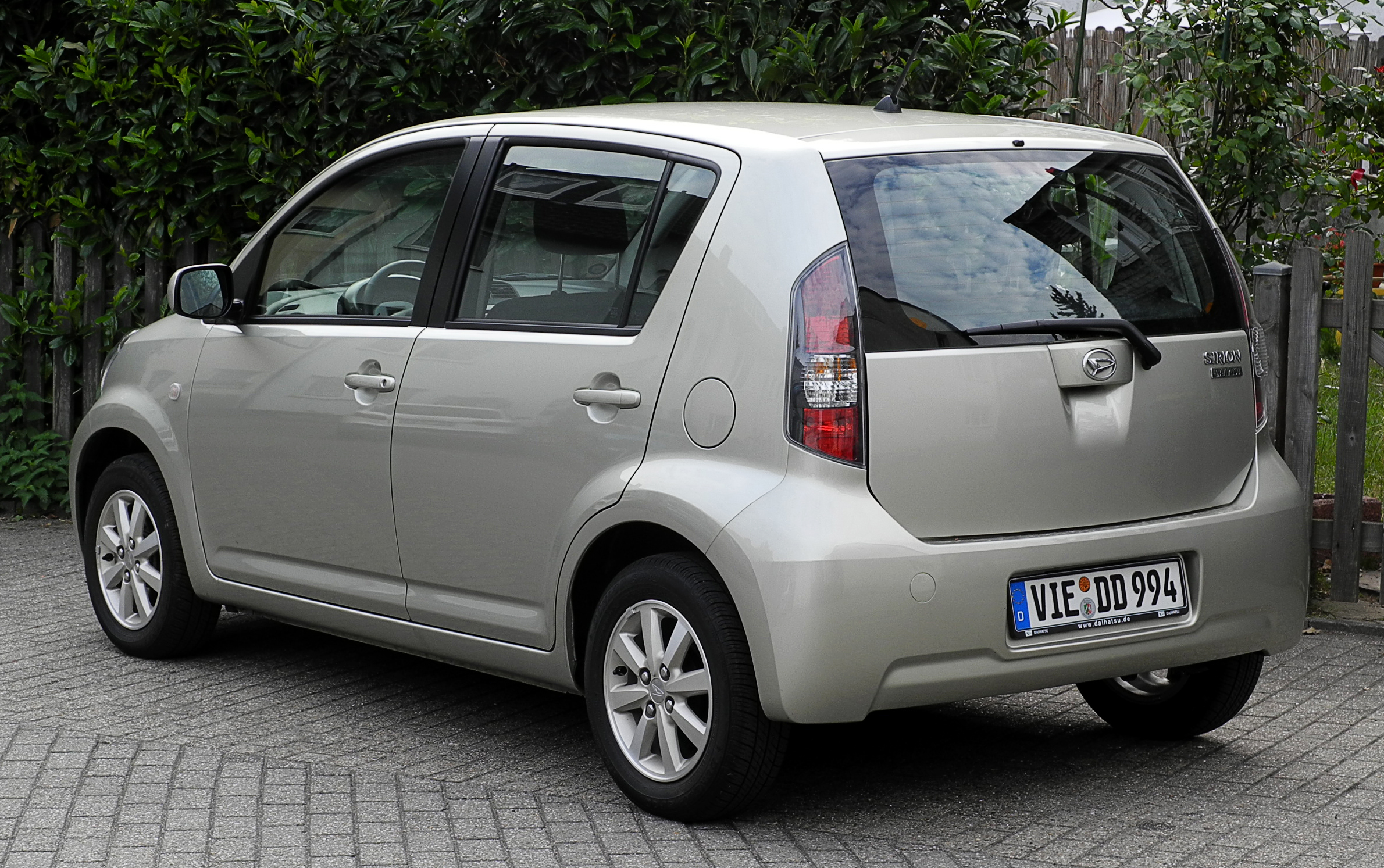
Facelift Sirion (Germany)

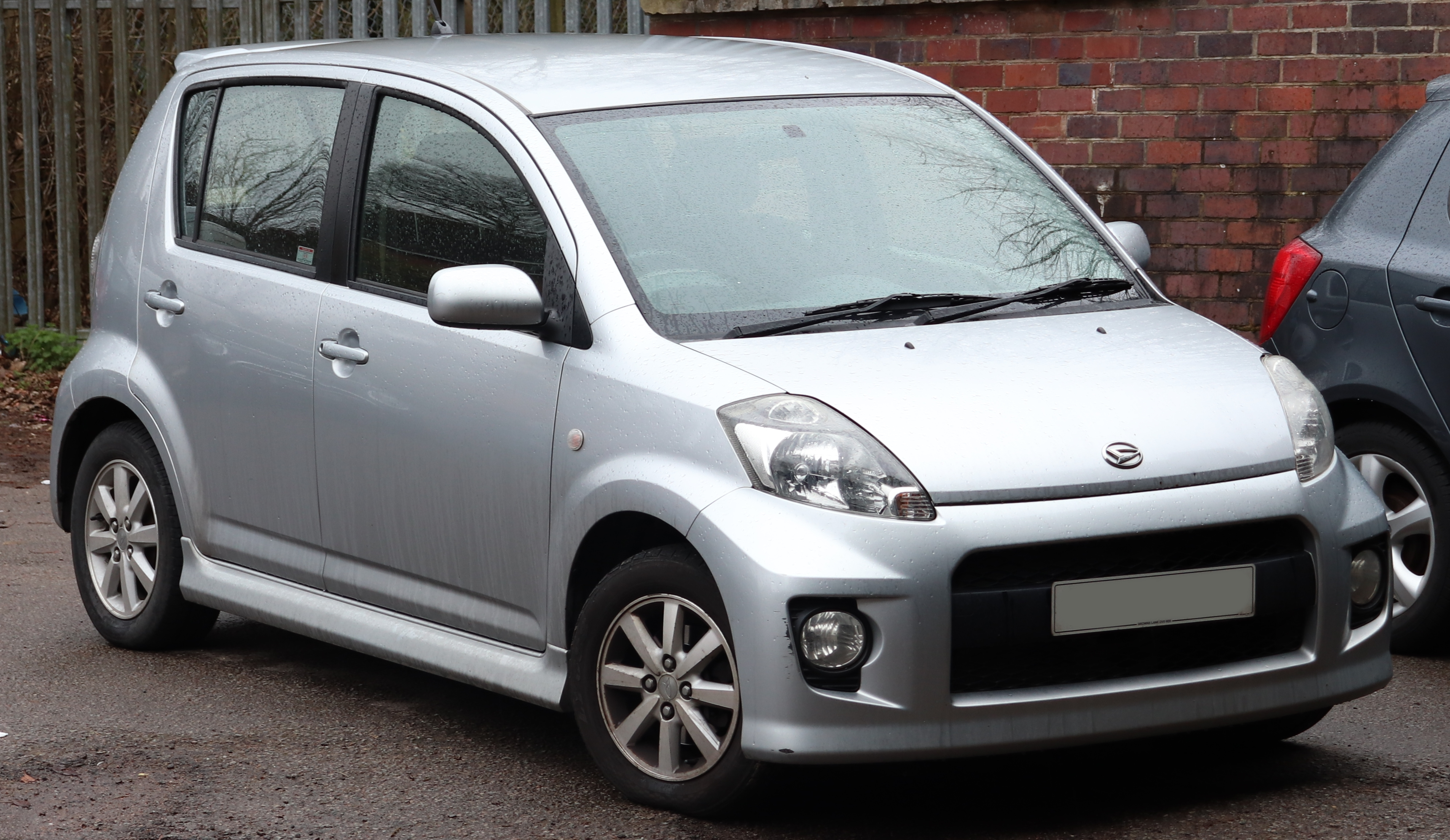
Facelift Sirion SX (UK)

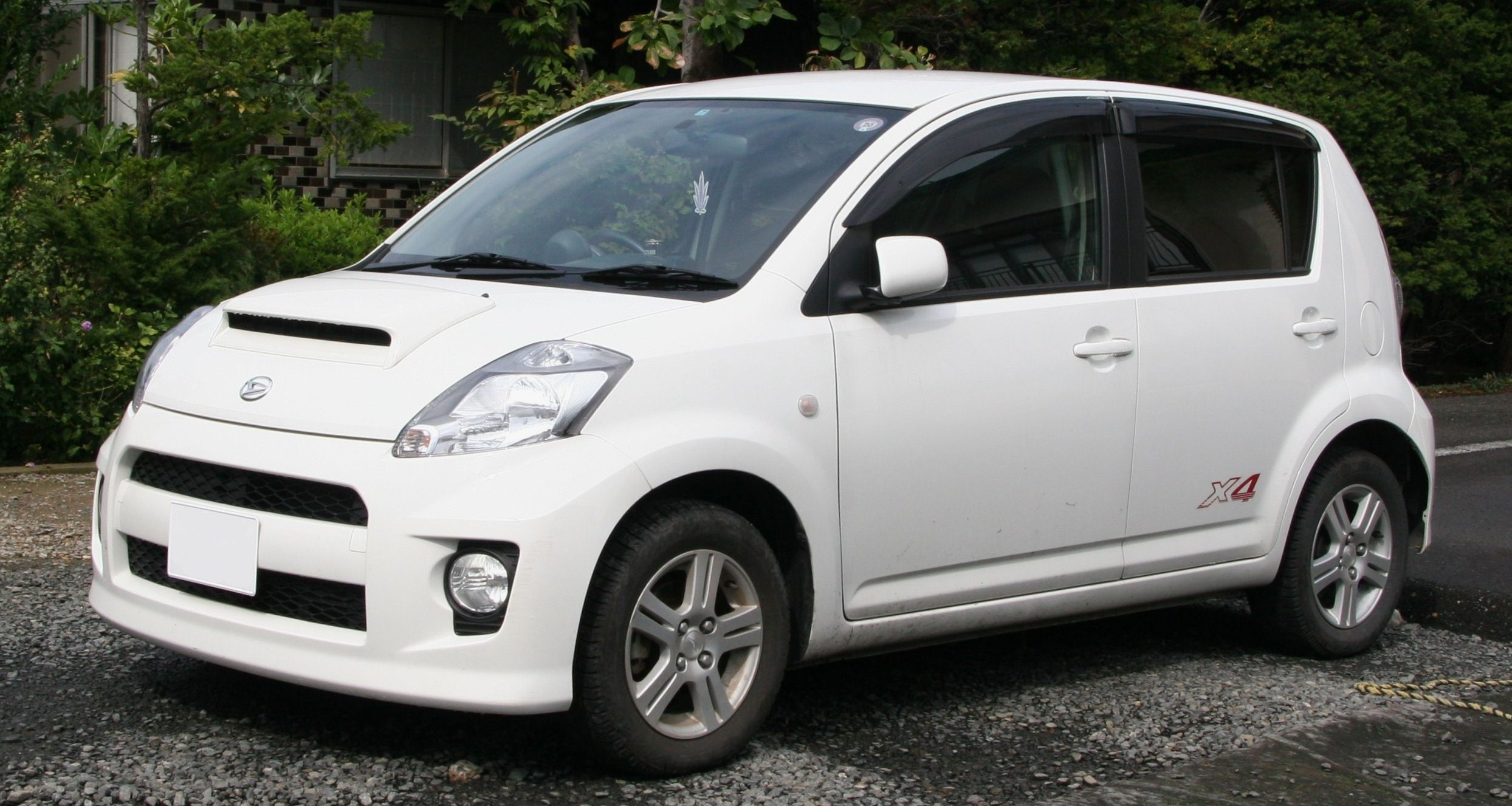
Boon X4 (M312S, Japan)

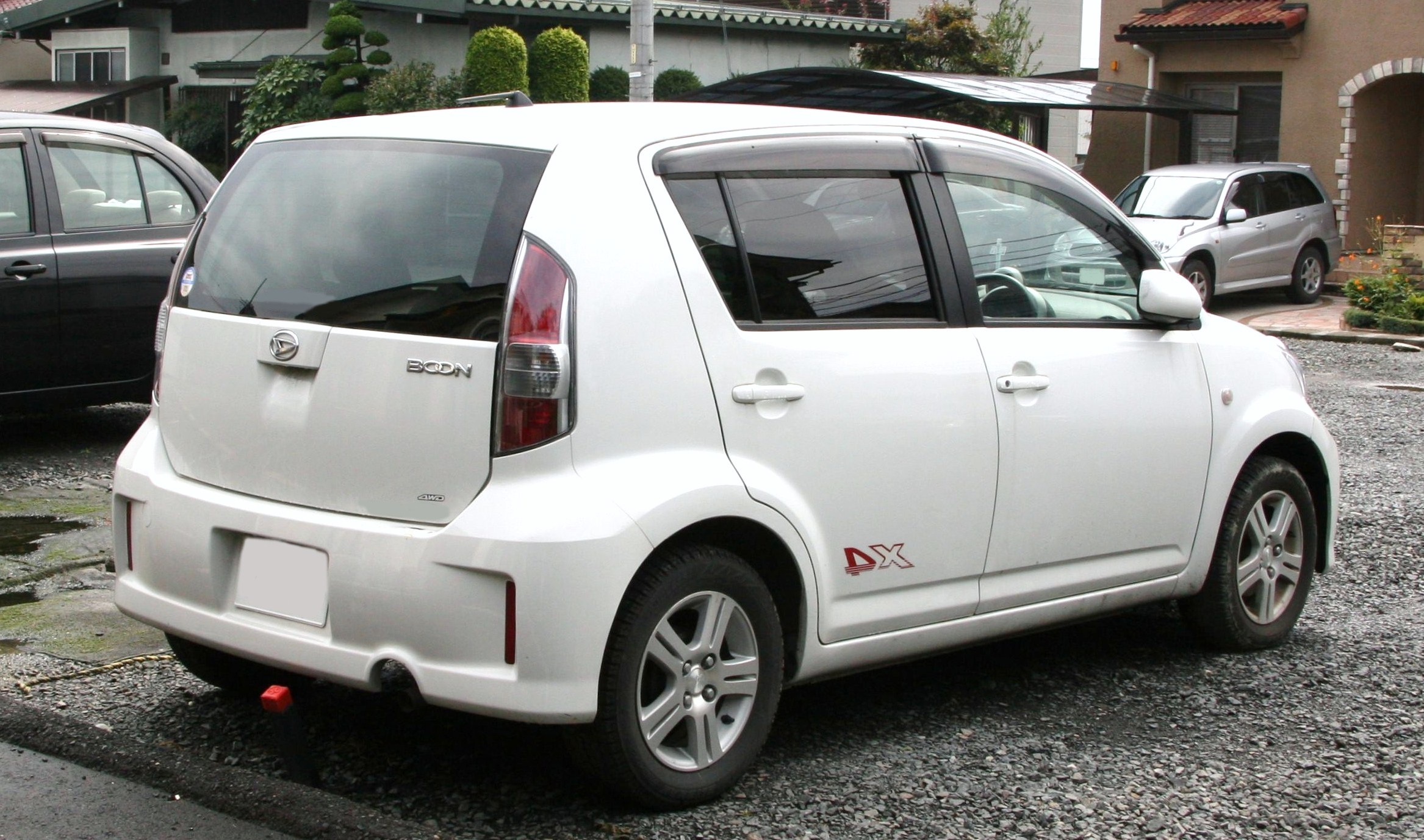
Boon X4 (M312S, Japan)

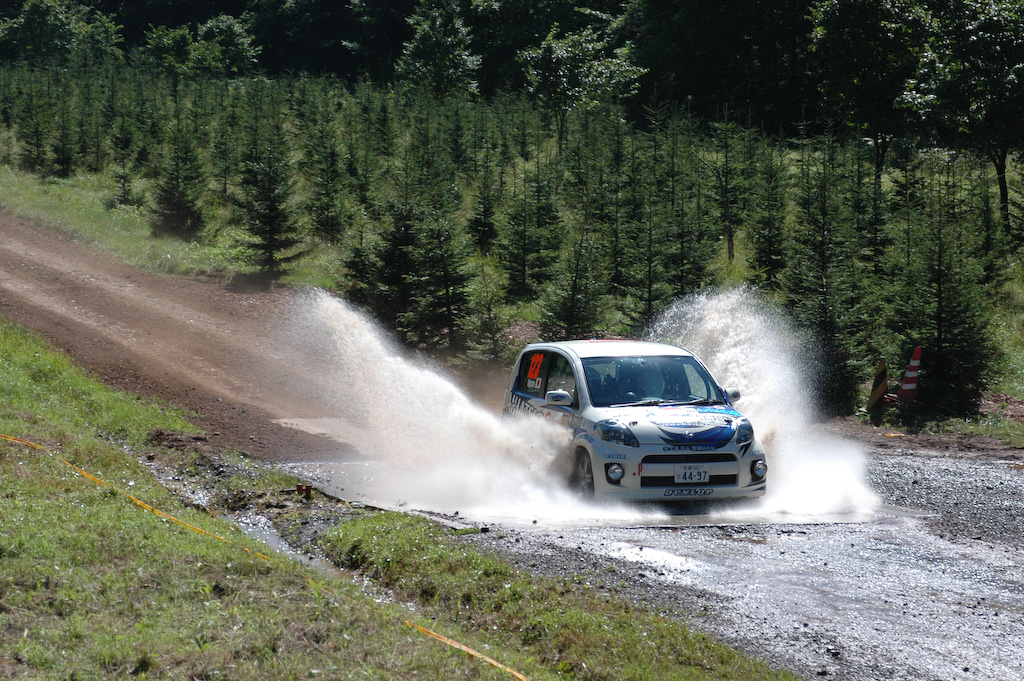
Boon at the 2006 Rally Japan

==== Passo ====
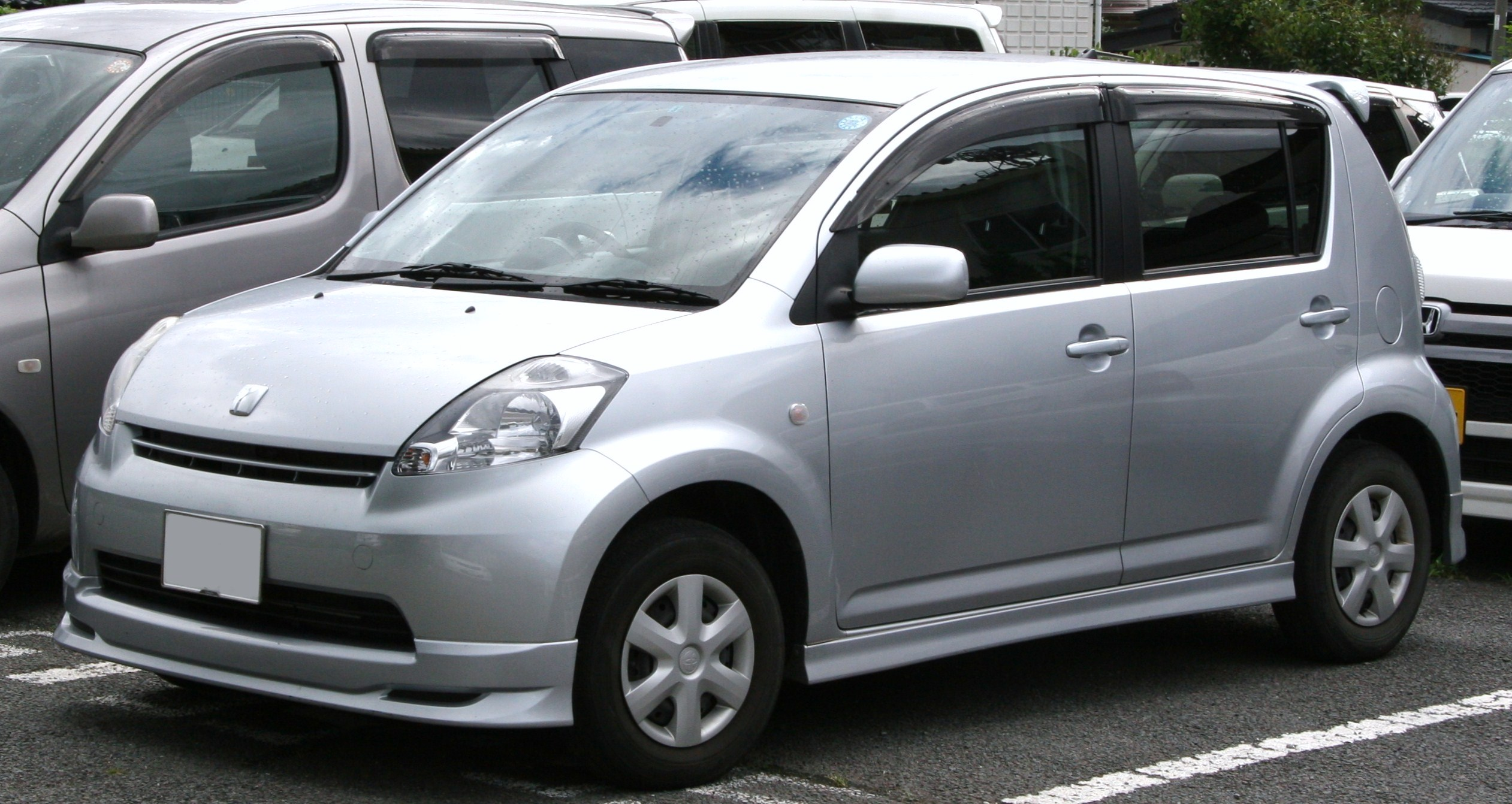
2004–2006 Toyota Passo (Japan)

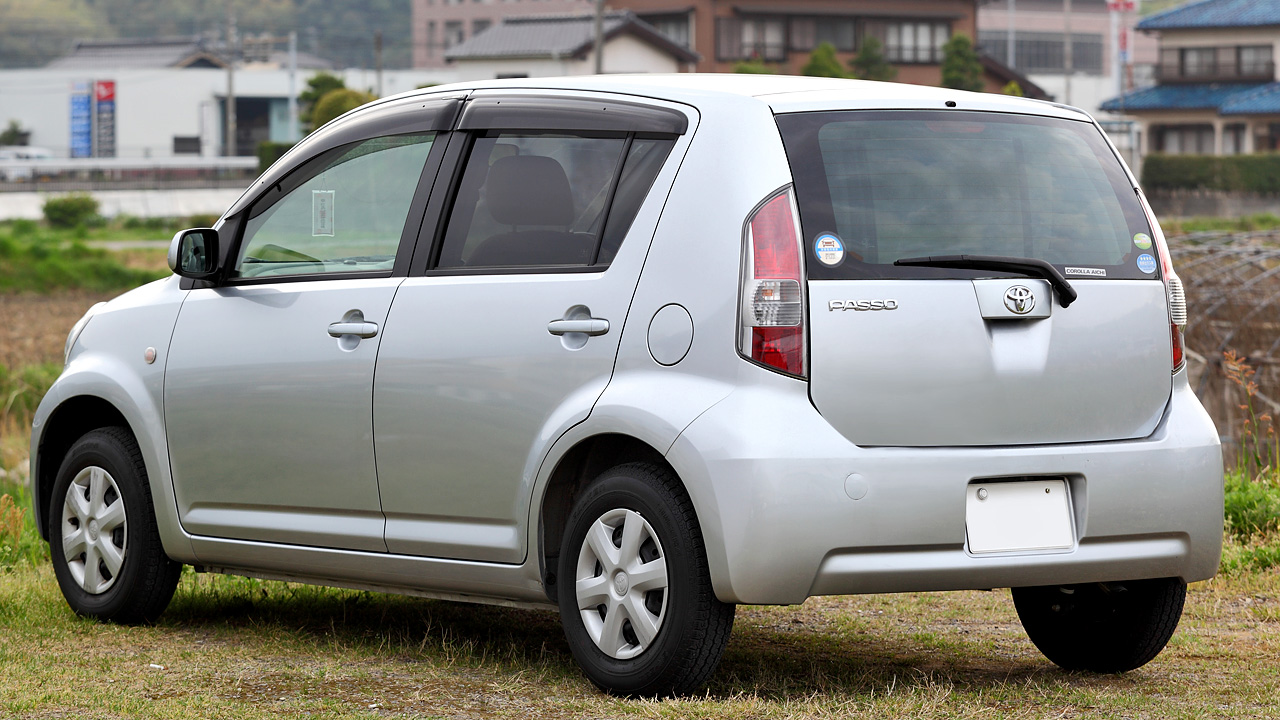
2004–2006 Passo (Japan)

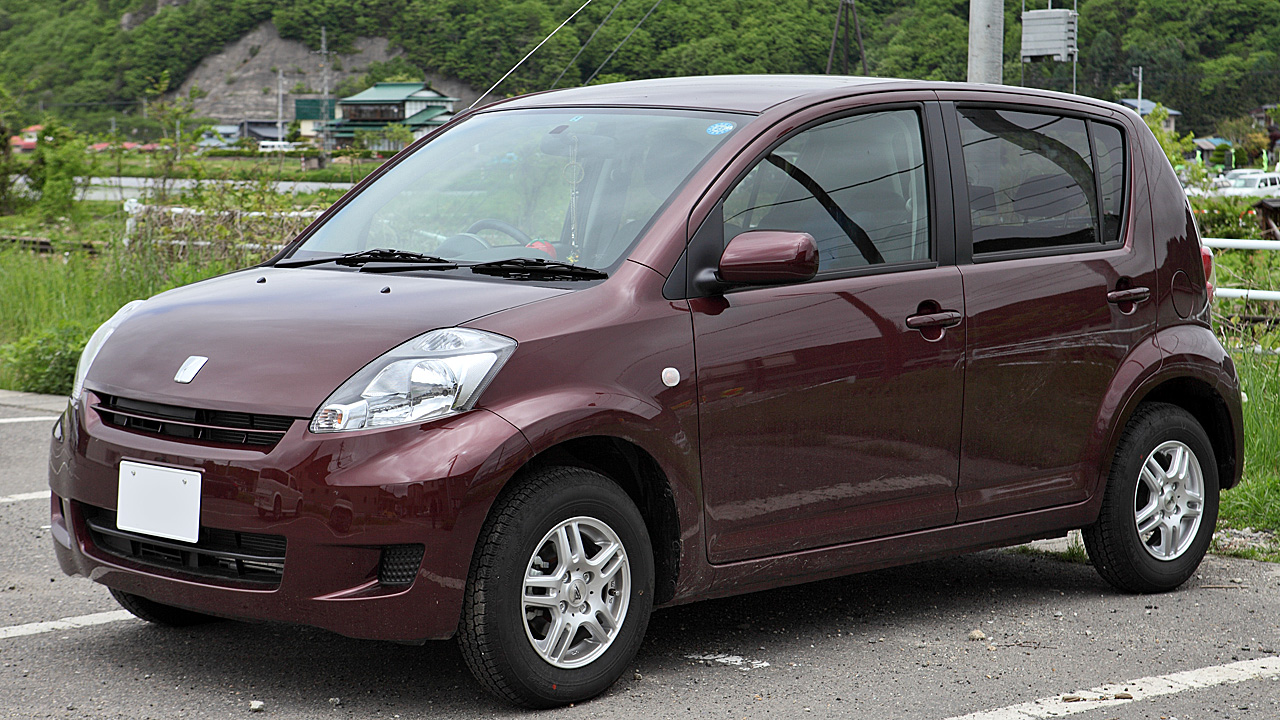
2006–2010 Passo (Japan)

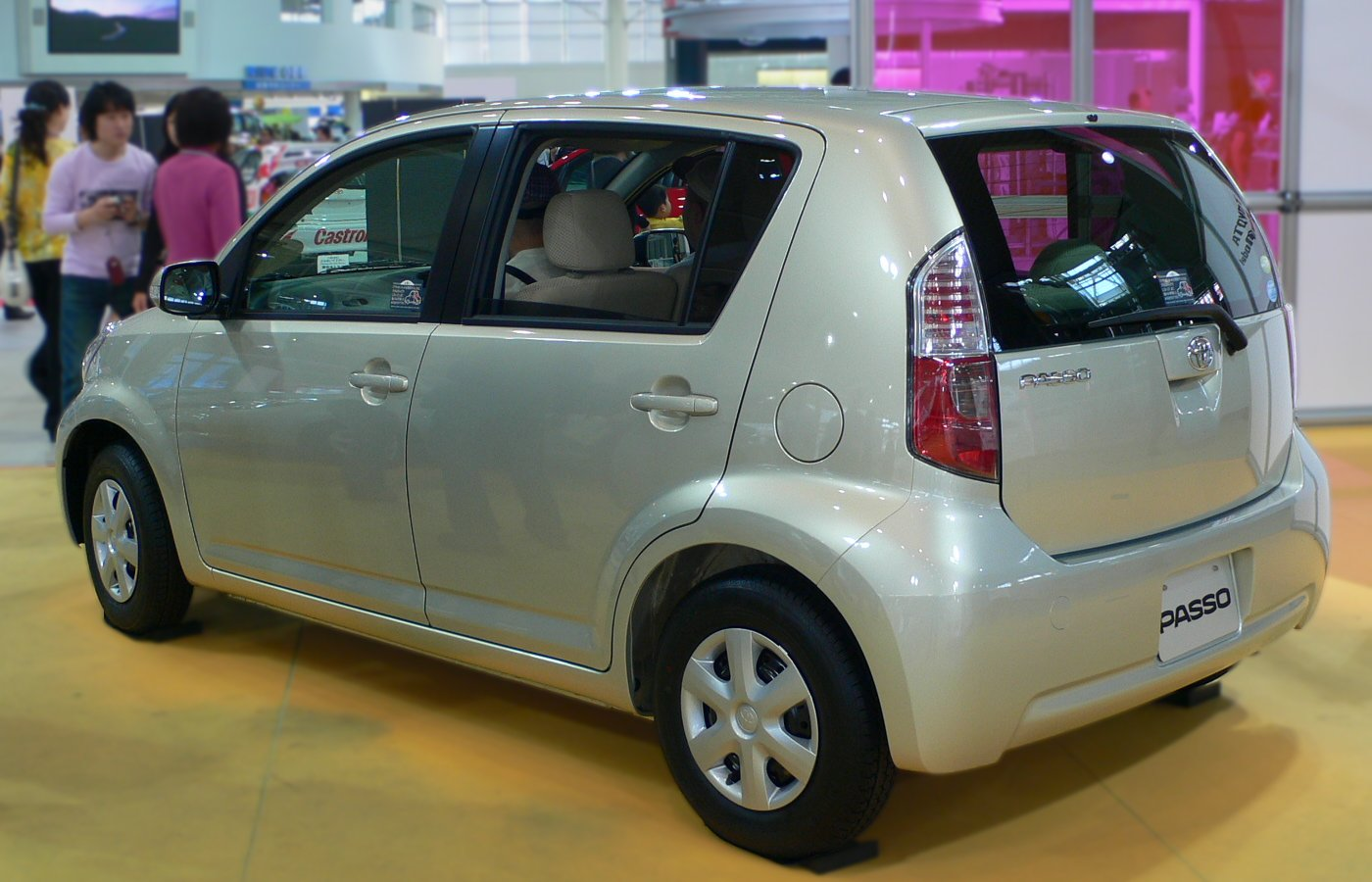
2006–2010 Passo (Japan)

==== Justy ====
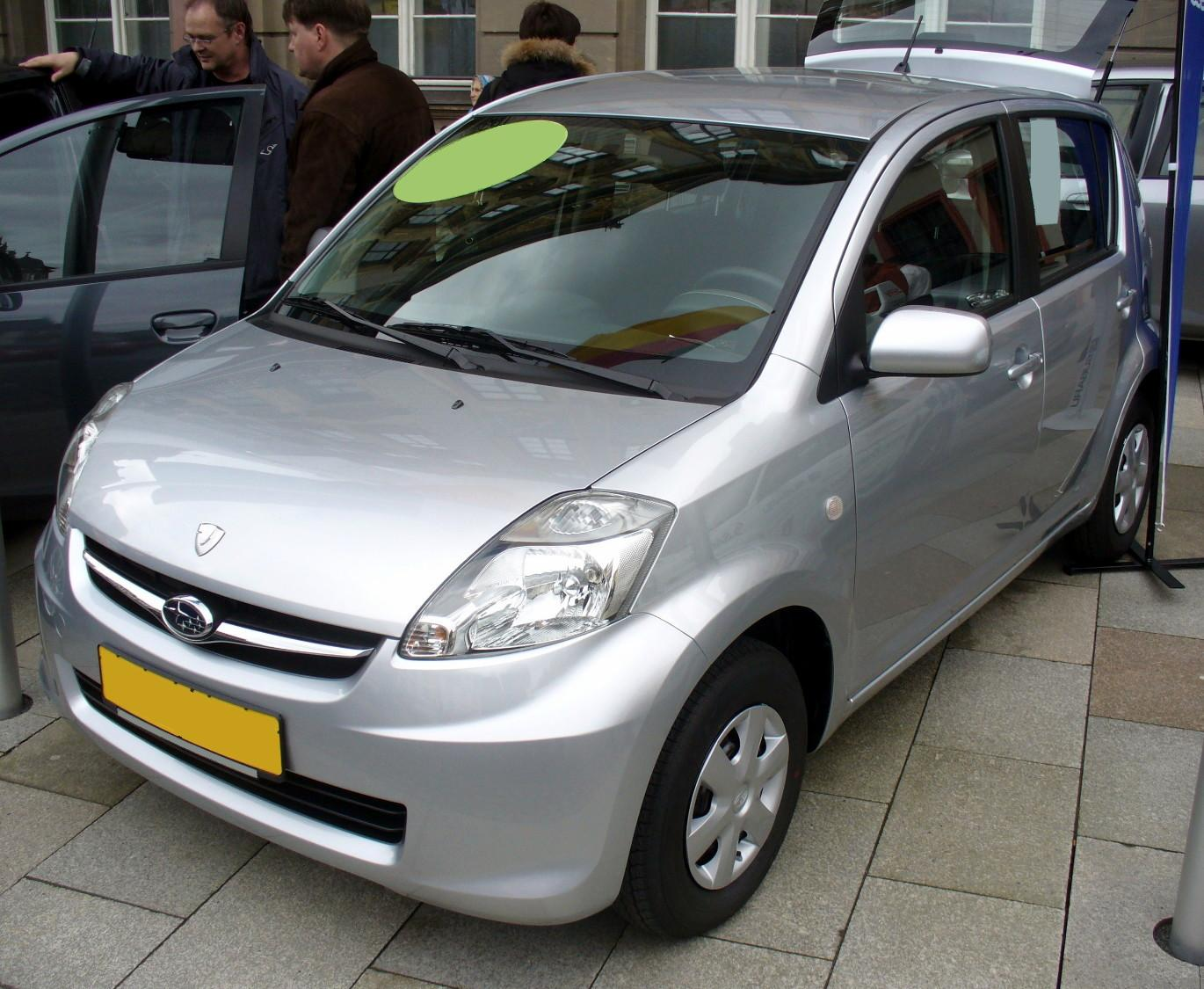
Subaru Justy

== Second generation (M600/AC30; 2010) ==
Second generation
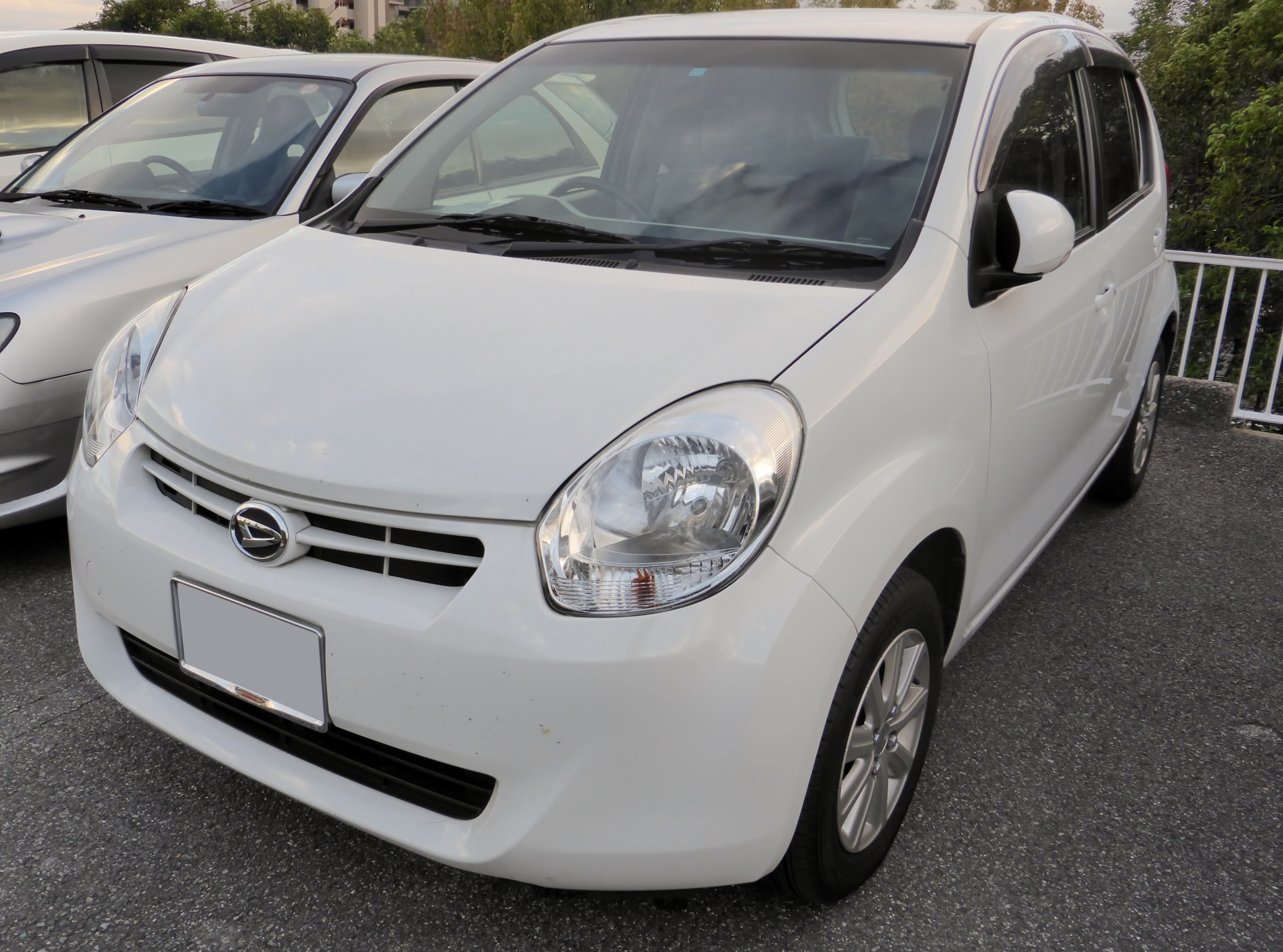
- Boon 1.0 CL (M600S, Japan)

Overview
- Model code: M600/AC30
- Also called: Toyota Passo; Daihatsu Sirion (Indonesia, 2011–2018); Perodua Myvi (Malaysia, 2011–2017)
- Production: February 2010 – April 2016 (Japan); 2011–2017 (Perodua)
- Assembly: Japan: Ikeda, Osaka (Ikeda plant); Malaysia: Rawang, Selangor (PMSB, Perodua Myvi)
- Designer: Hideo Miwa, Jiro Matsueda and Yukinobu Morioka (pre-facelift); Taizo Doi (facelift)

Powertrain
- Engine: Petrol: 996 cc 1KR-FE I3; 1329 cc 1NR-FE I4
- Power output: 51 kW (68 hp; 69 PS) (1KR-VE); 70 kW (94 hp; 95 PS) (1NR-FE)
- Transmission: 5-speed manual; 4-speed automatic; CVT

Dimensions
- Wheelbase: 2,440 mm (96.1 in)
- Length: 3,640–3,650 mm (143.3–143.7 in)
- Width: 1,665 mm (65.6 in)
- Height: 1,535 mm (60.4 in)
- Kerb weight: 910–970 kg (2,006–2,138 lb)

The second-generation Boon was unveiled in Japan on 15 February 2010 alongside the second-generation Passo. Daihatsu calls this the M600, while Toyota uses the AC30 model code. Toyota also offered a well-equipped version with a redesigned, smoothed off front end, called the Passo +Hana. The +Hana also has champagne-coloured doorhandles and exterior mirrors; there was no equivalent Daihatsu model.

The second-generation Myvi, based on the Boon, was released in Malaysia on 17 June 2011.

The third-generation Sirion for the Indonesian market was unveiled at the 19th Indonesia International Motor Show on 23 July 2011.

In April 2013, Toyota New Zealand announced its decision to stop selling the second-generation Sirion, still on sale, stating it was unable to secure Daihatsu products that comply with future regulatory standards for New Zealand.

=== Gallery ===
==== Daihatsu Boon ====
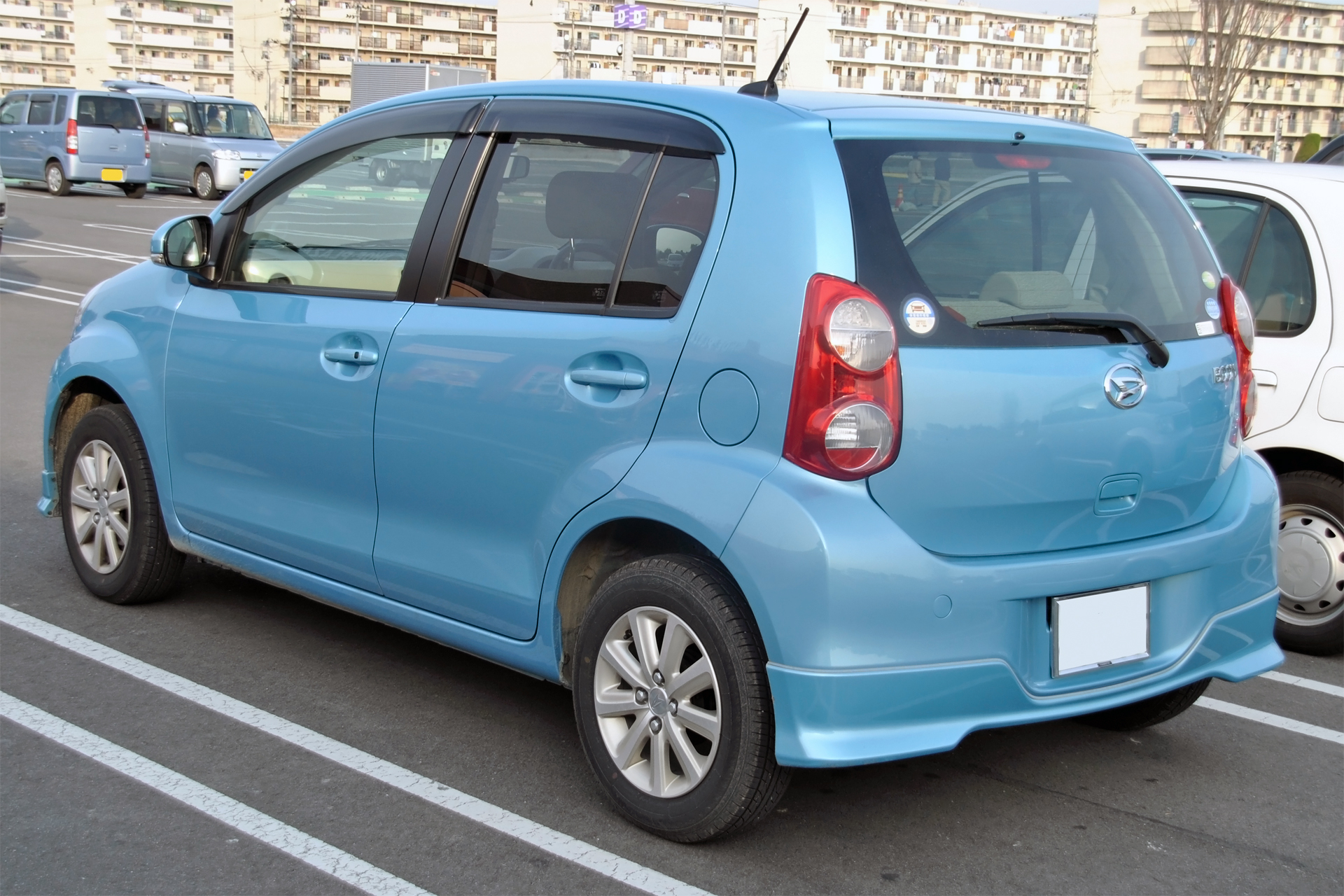
2010–2014 Boon (Japan)

==== Toyota Passo ====
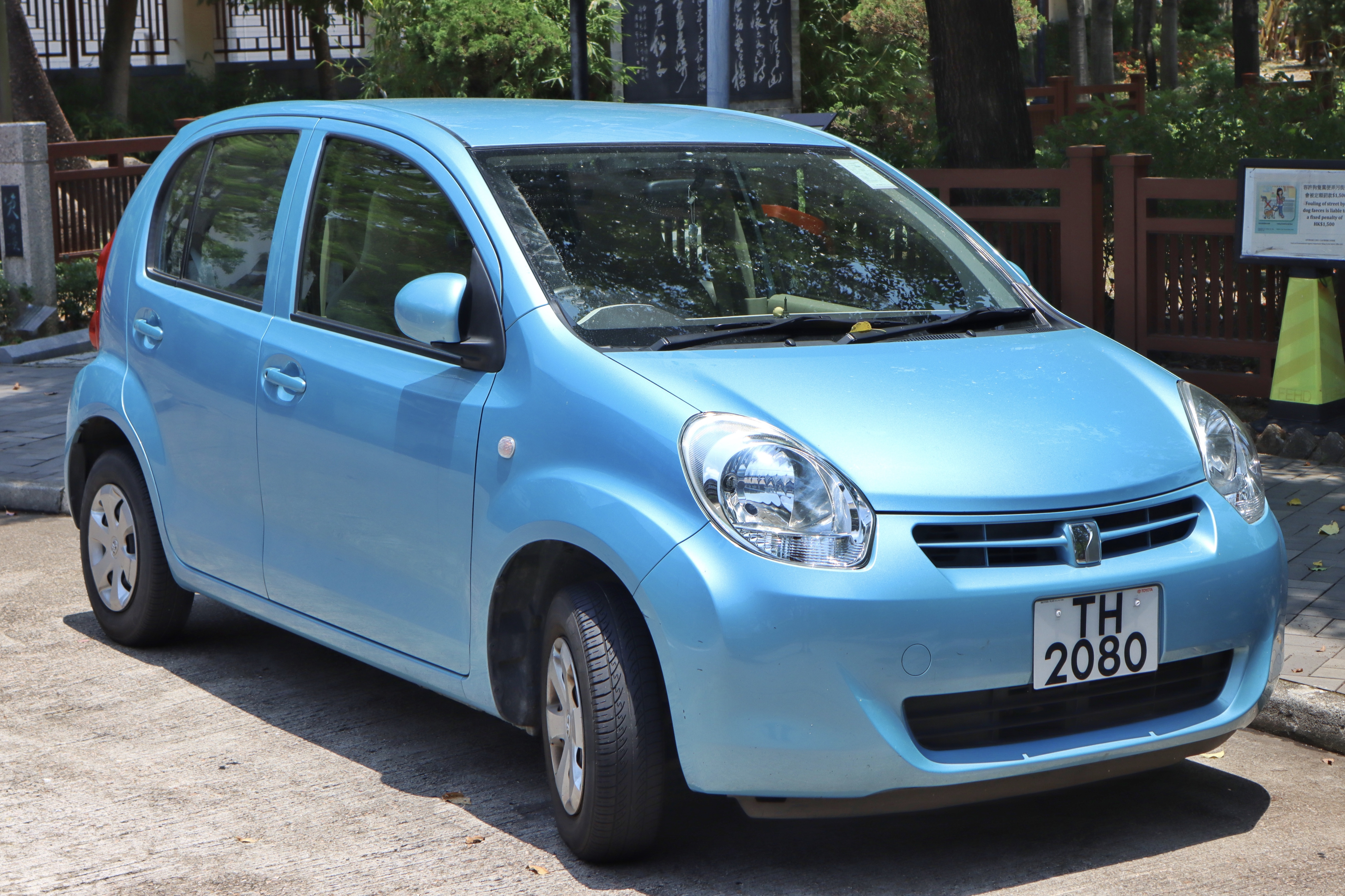
2010–2014 Toyota Passo (Hong Kong)

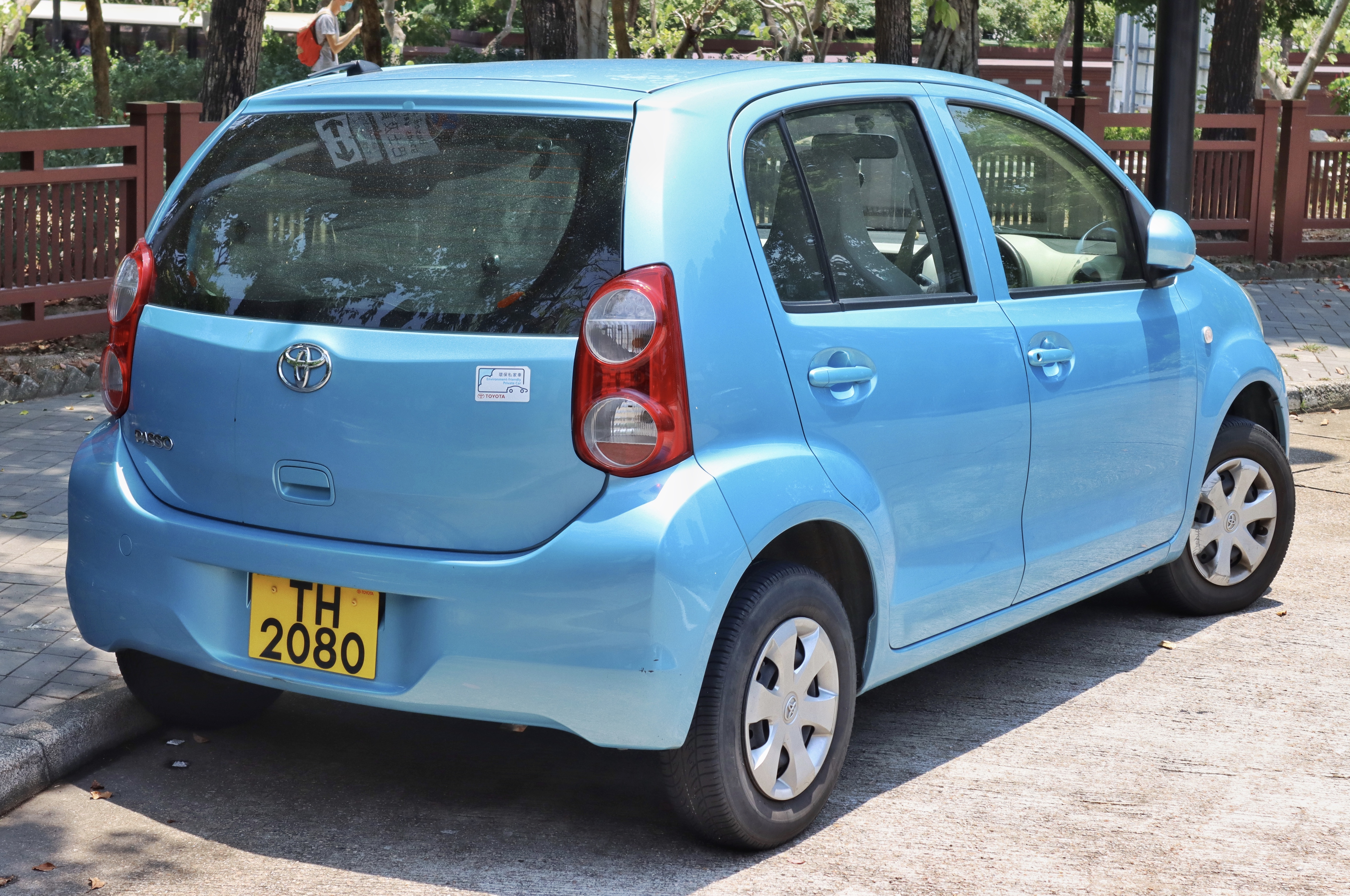
2010–2014 Toyota Passo (Hong Kong)

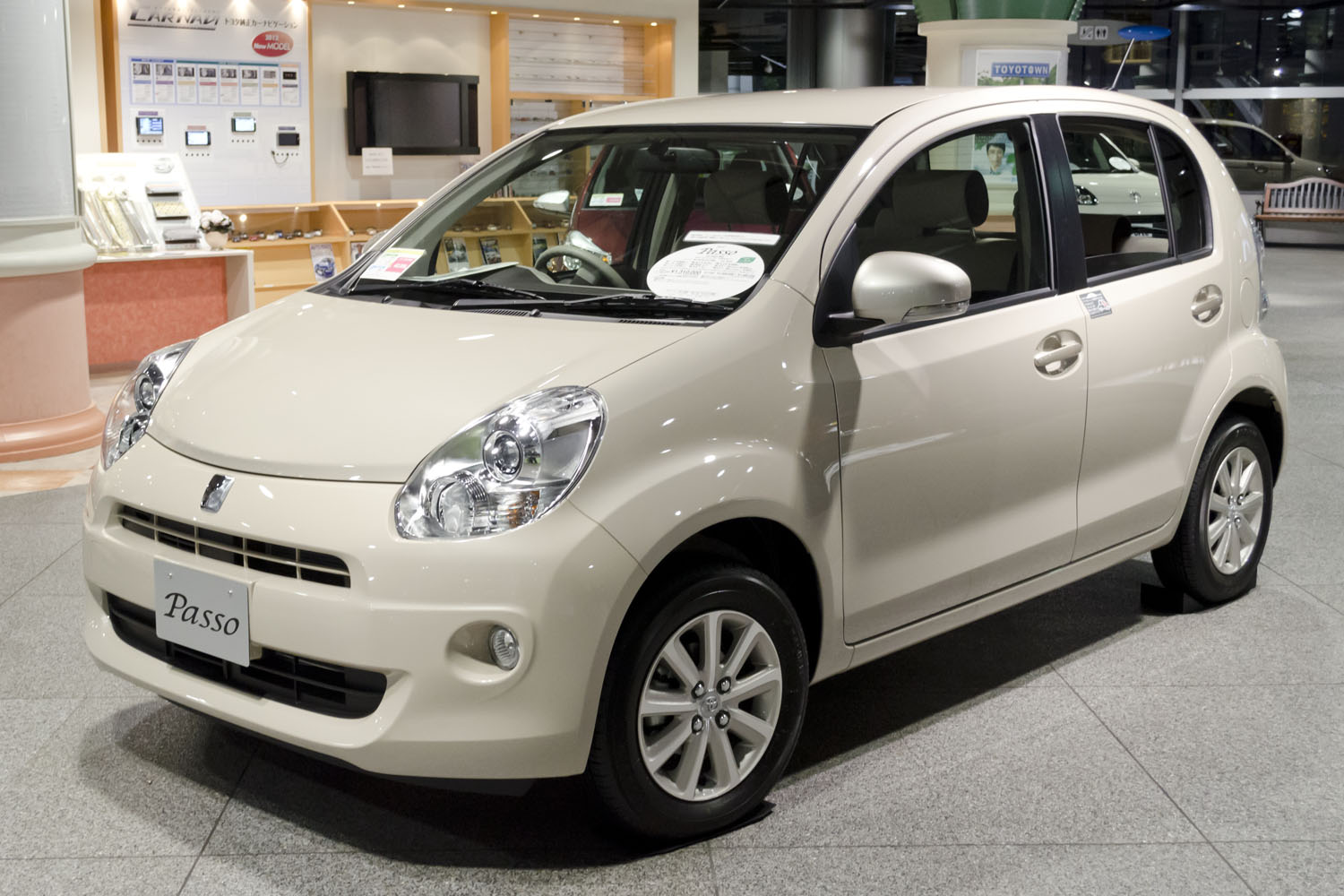
2010–2014 Toyota Passo +Hana (Japan)

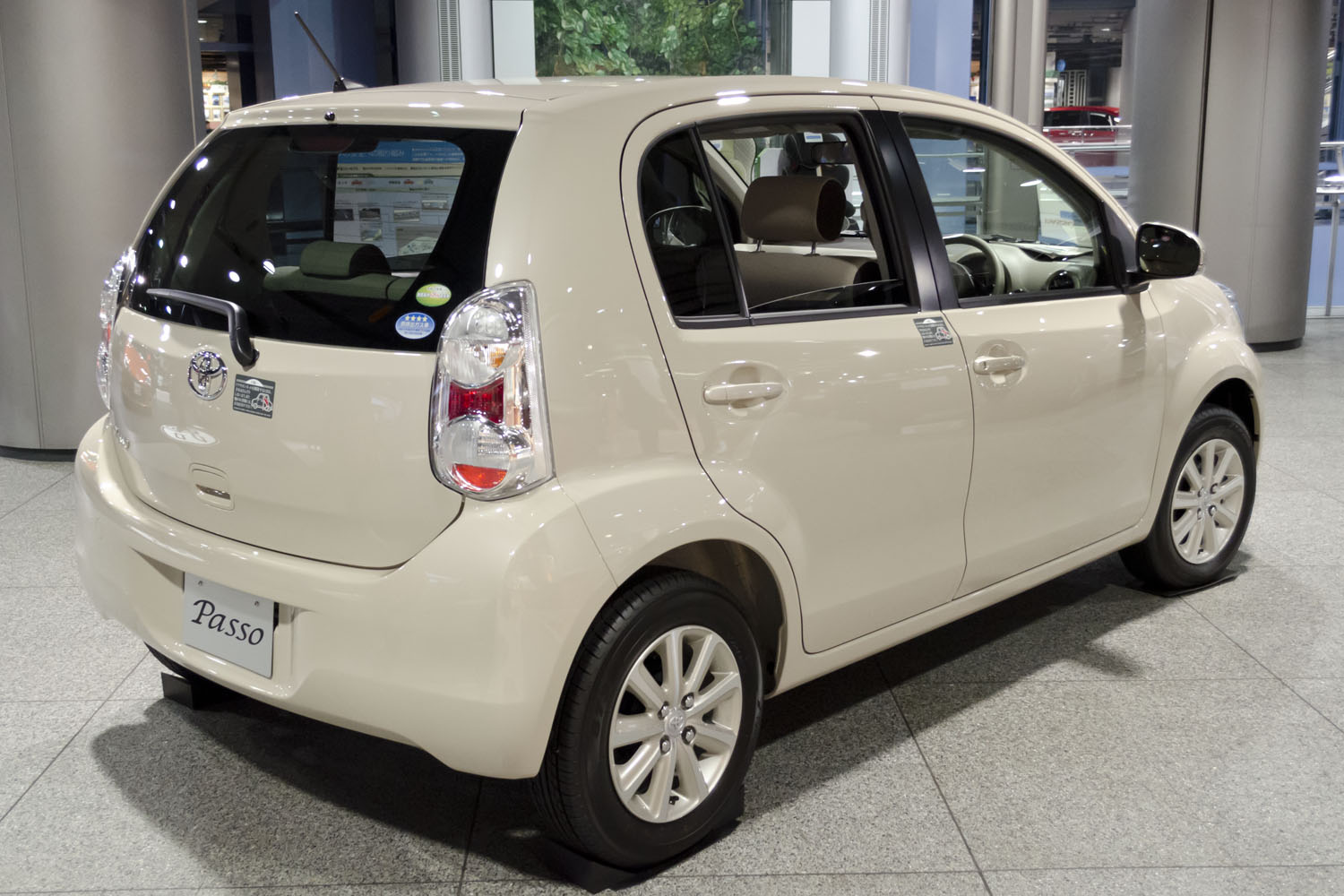
2010–2014 Toyota Passo +Hana (Japan)

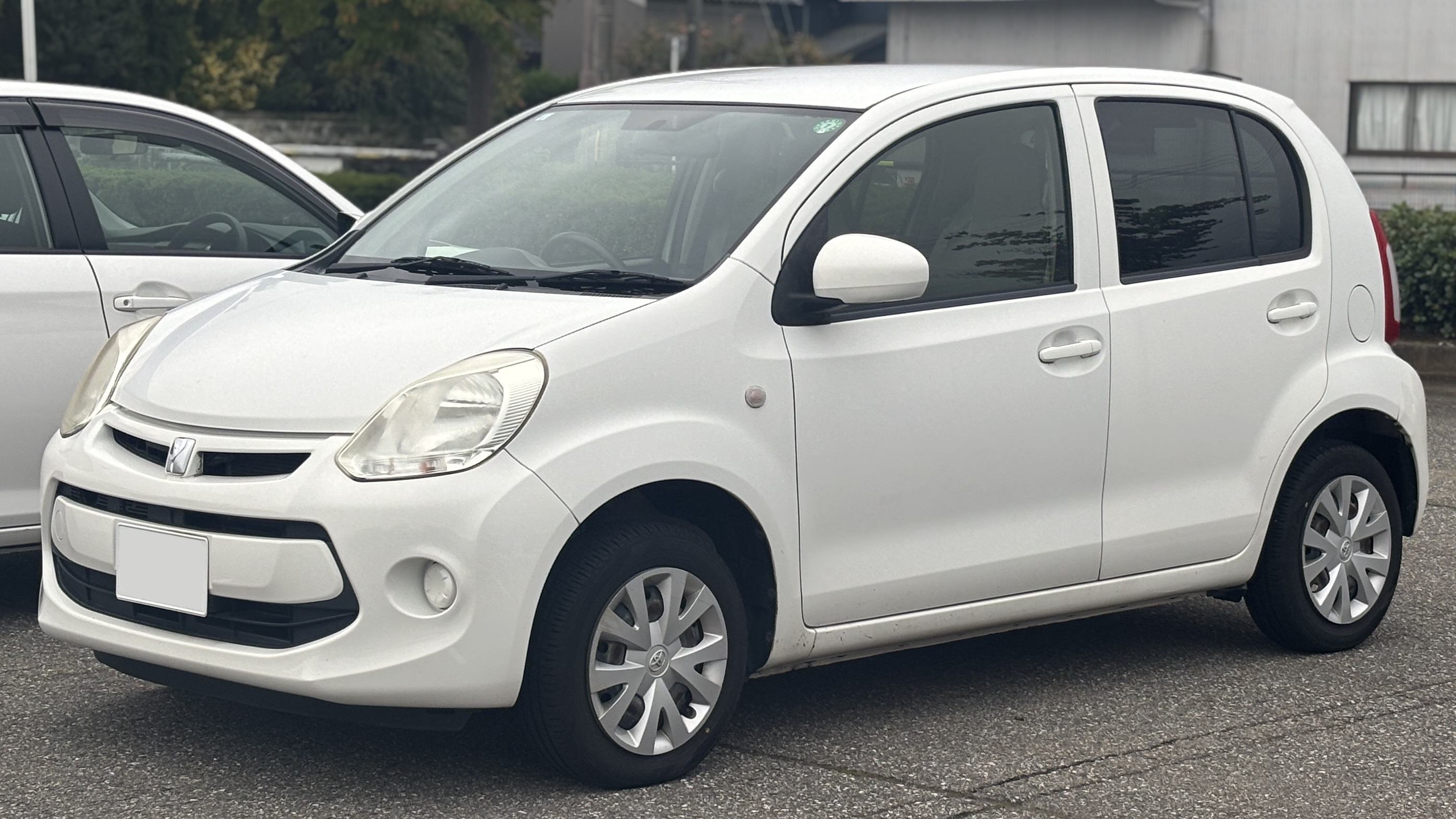
2014–2016 Toyota Passo (Japan)

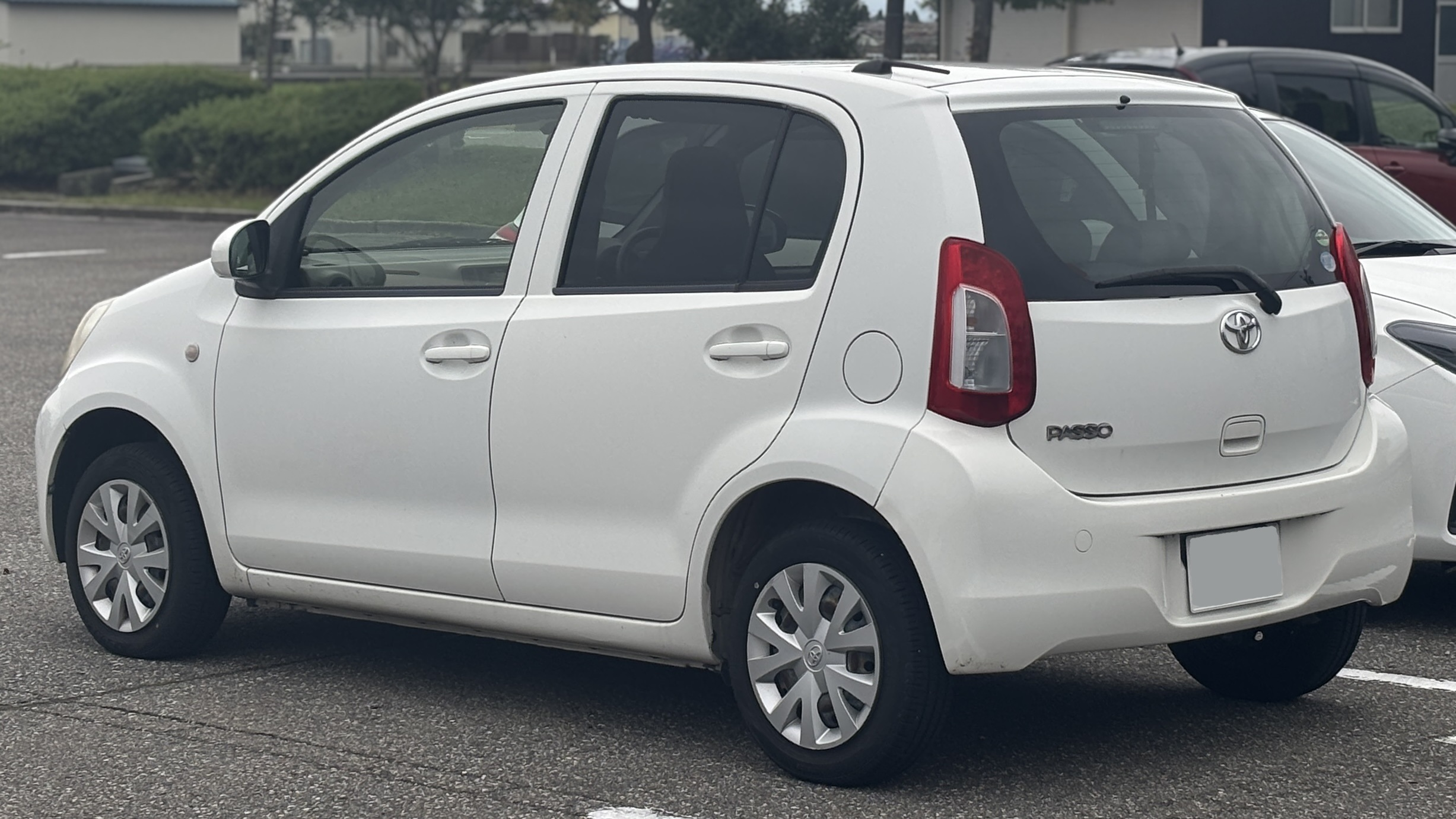
2014–2016 Toyota Passo (Japan)

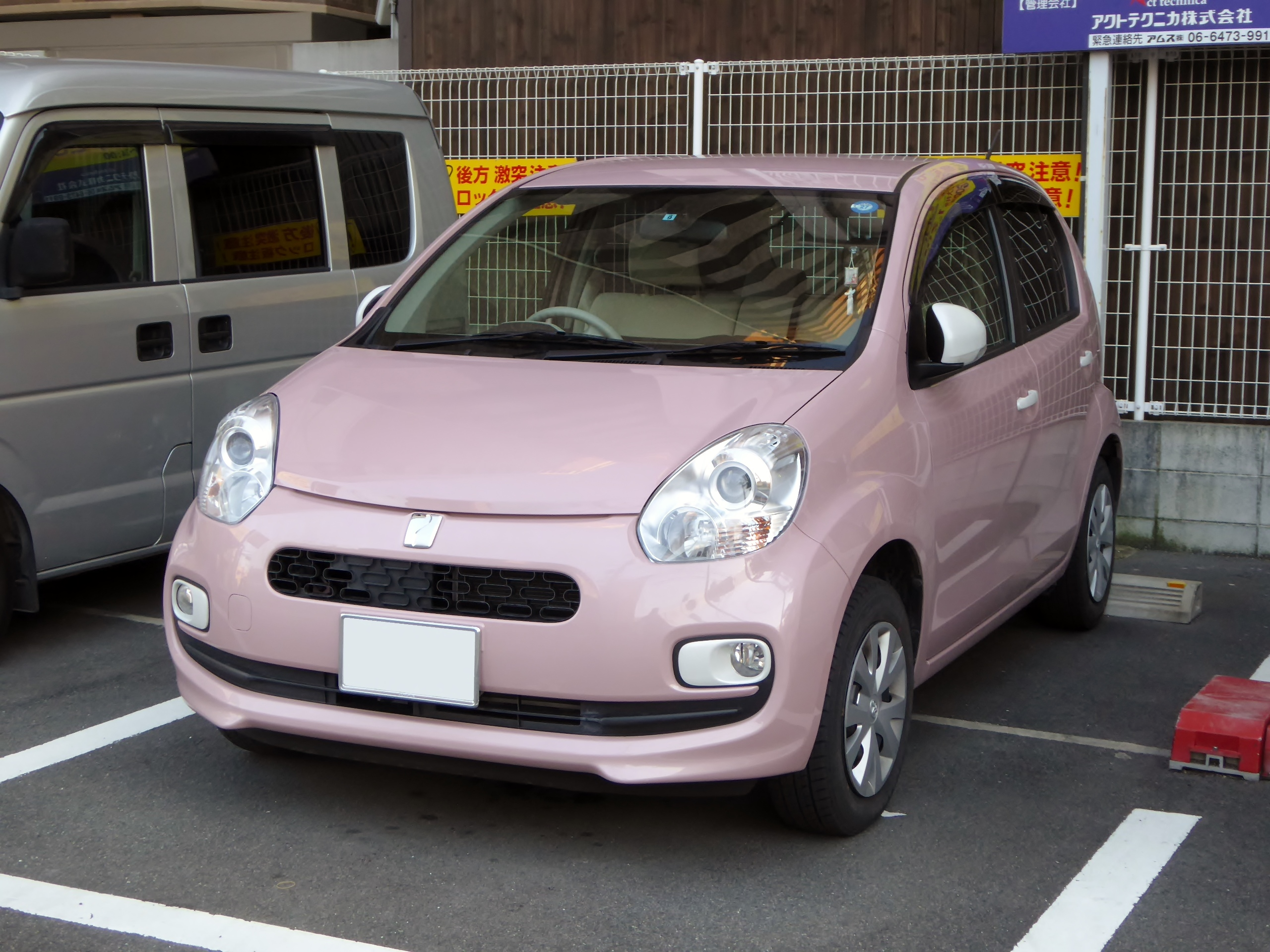
2014–2016 Toyota Passo +Hana 1.0 (KGC30, Japan)

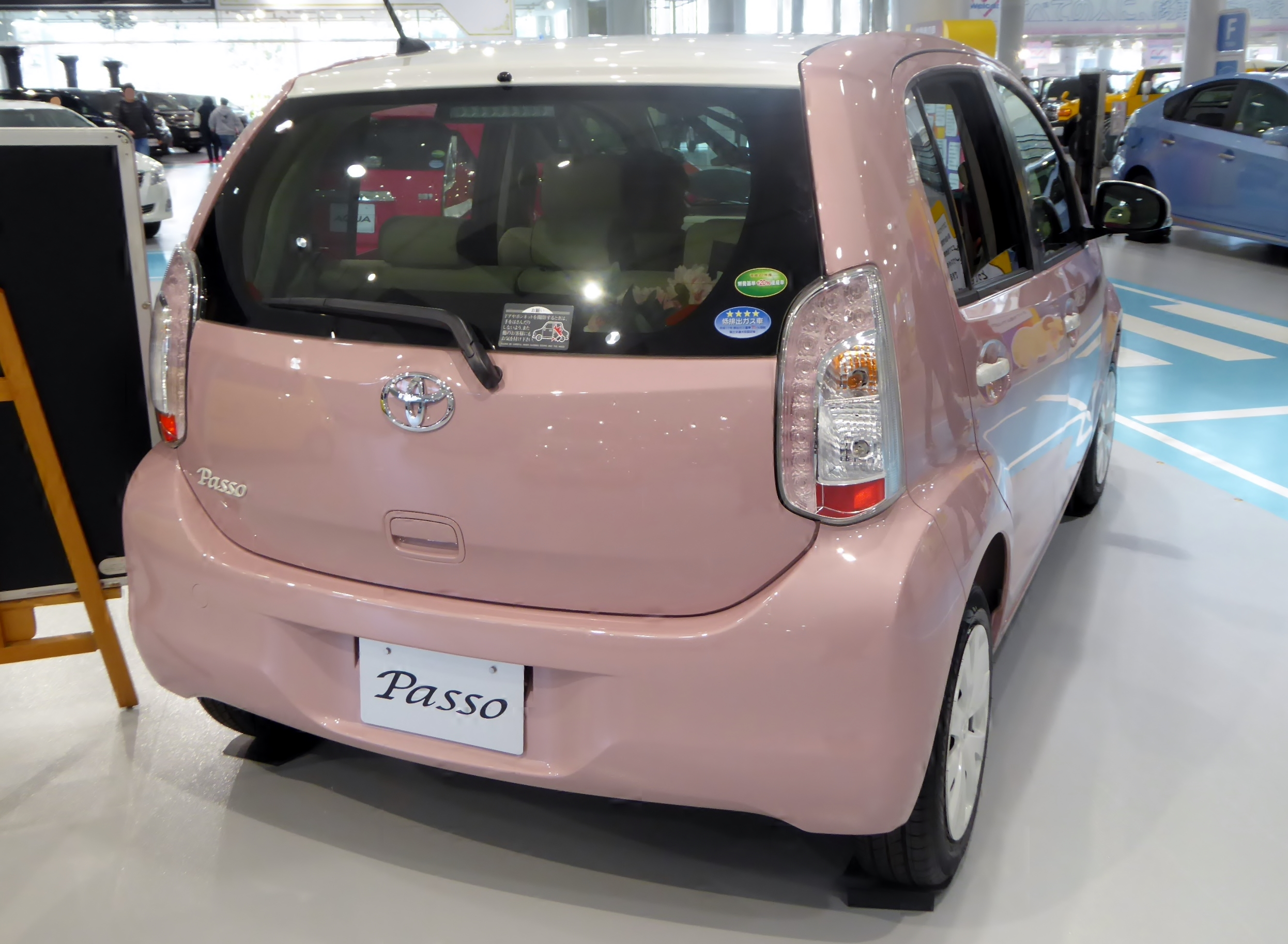
2014–2016 Toyota Passo +Hana 1.0 (KGC30, Japan)

== Third generation (M700; 2016) ==
Third generation
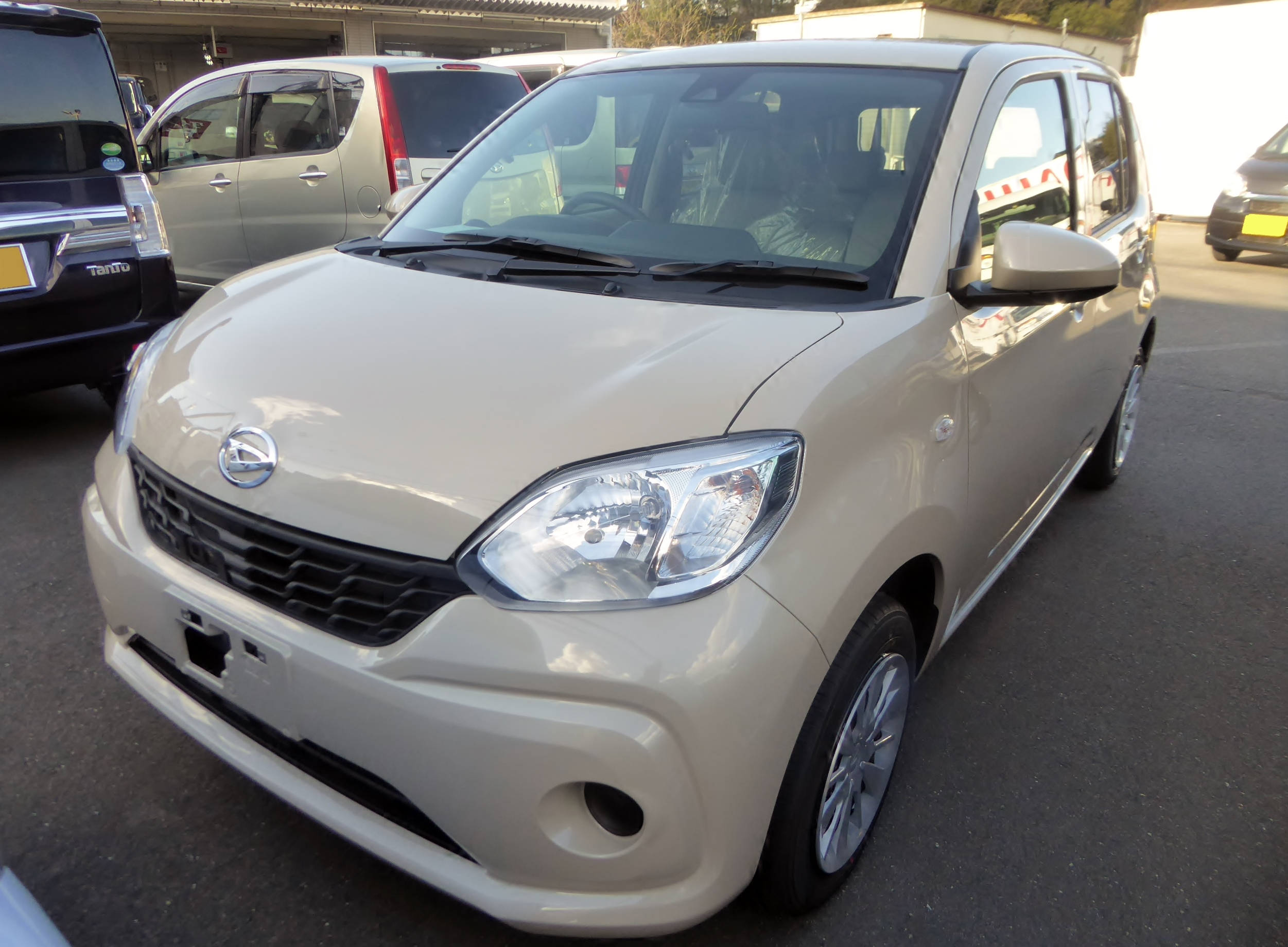
- 2016–2018 Boon X L Package SA II (M700S, Japan)

Overview
- Model code: M700
- Also called: Toyota Passo
- Production: April 2016 – December 2023 (Boon); April 2016 – September 2023 (Passo)
- Assembly: Japan: Ikeda, Osaka (Ikeda plant)

Body and chassis
- Related: Daihatsu Thor

Powertrain
- Engine: Petrol: 996 cc 1KR-FE I3
- Power output: 51 kW (68 hp; 69 PS)
- Transmission: CVT

Dimensions
- Wheelbase: 2,490 mm (98.0 in)
- Length: 3,650–3,680 mm (143.7–144.9 in)
- Width: 1,665 mm (65.6 in)
- Height: 1,525 mm (60.0 in)
- Kerb weight: 910 kg (2,006 lb) (FWD); 960 kg (2,116 lb) (4WD)

The third-generation Boon and Passo were unveiled in Japan on 12 April 2016. A better-equipped variant called the Boon CILQ was also available, featuring a pill-shaped grille that was distinct from the redesigned oval headlamps. This model was sold as the Passo Moda by Toyota and replaced the Passo +Hana from the previous generation.

Both the Boon and the Passo received a facelift on 10 October 2018, along with the introduction of a "Style" variant for the Boon. The Passo now includes an improved collision avoidance support system (Smart Assist III), which can detect various elements such as pedestrians, vehicles, preceding and oncoming cars, and obstacles. It can then activate several driver assistance systems, including alerting the driver or switching between low and high beams. For the facelift model, the CILQ/Style/Moda submodels received a much larger grille, pulled all the way down to the bottom of the bumper, and the black C-pillar panel was smoothed off and received a high-gloss finish (other types were matte black plastic with four horizontal ridges).

The third-generation Boon is the only model that is not built as the corresponding generation Perodua Myvi (which is also sold as the Daihatsu Sirion in Indonesia).

=== Gallery ===
==== Boon ====
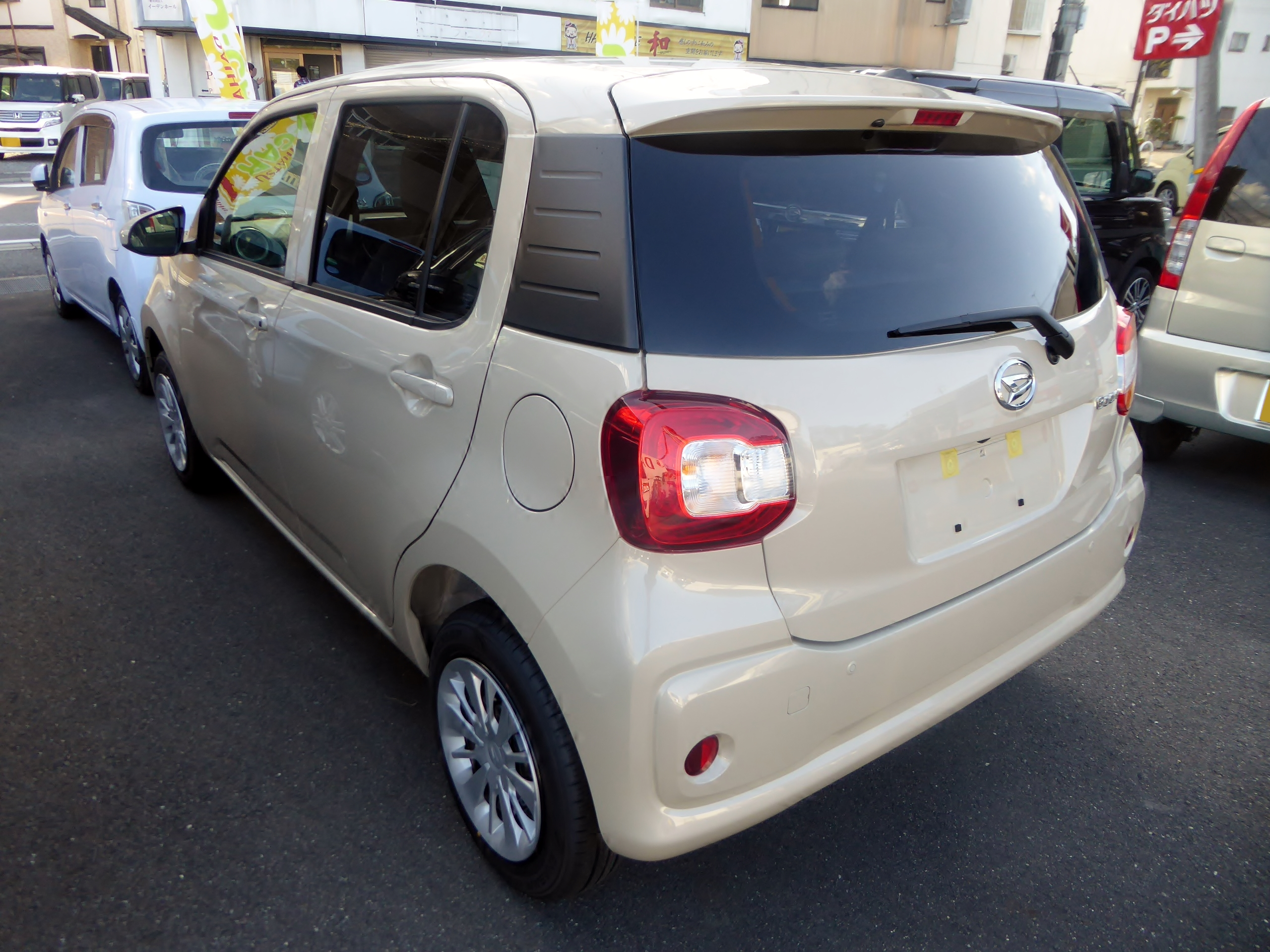
2016–2018 Boon X "L Package SA II" (M700S)

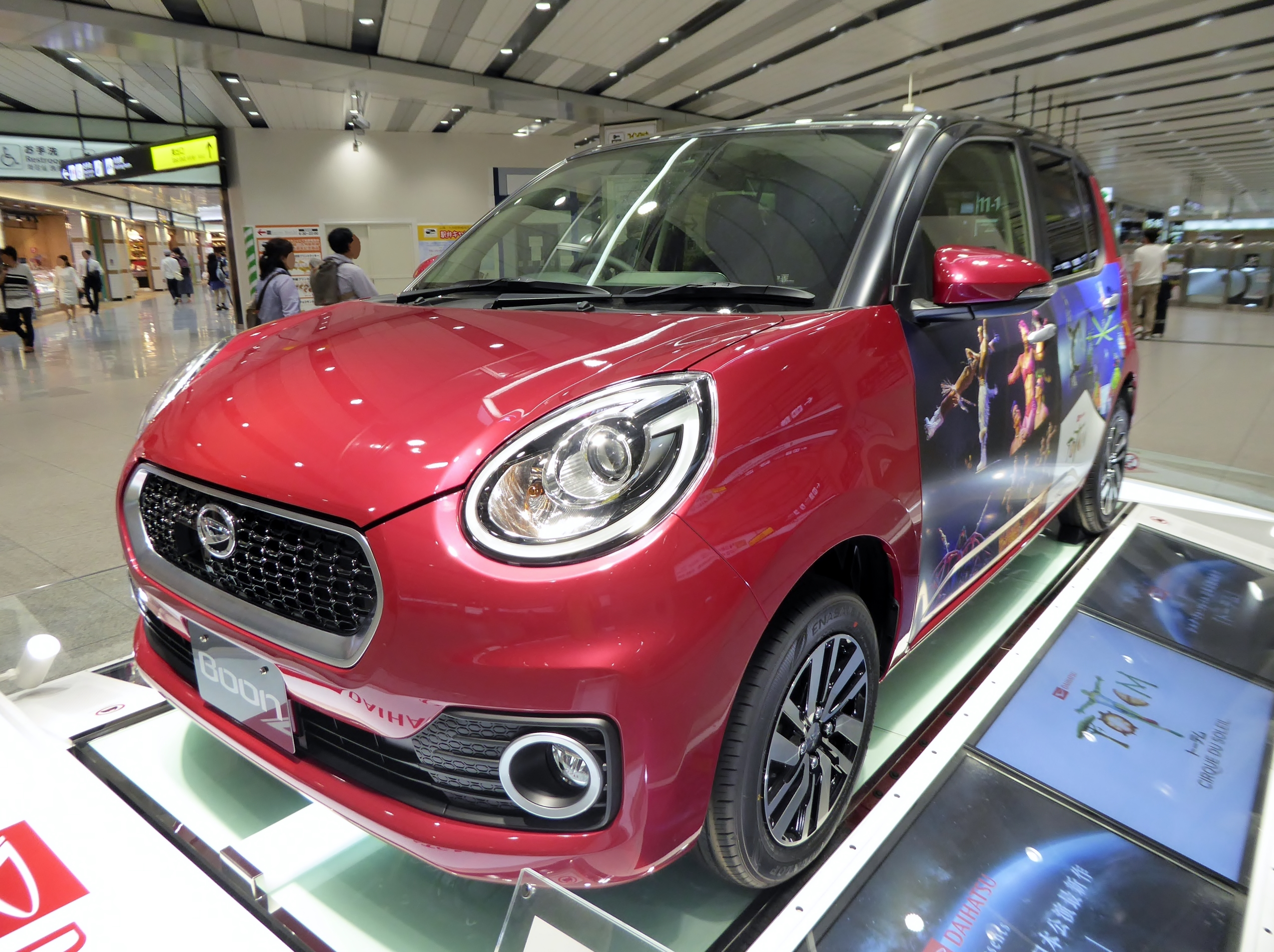
2016–2018 Boon Cilq "G Package SA II" (M700S)

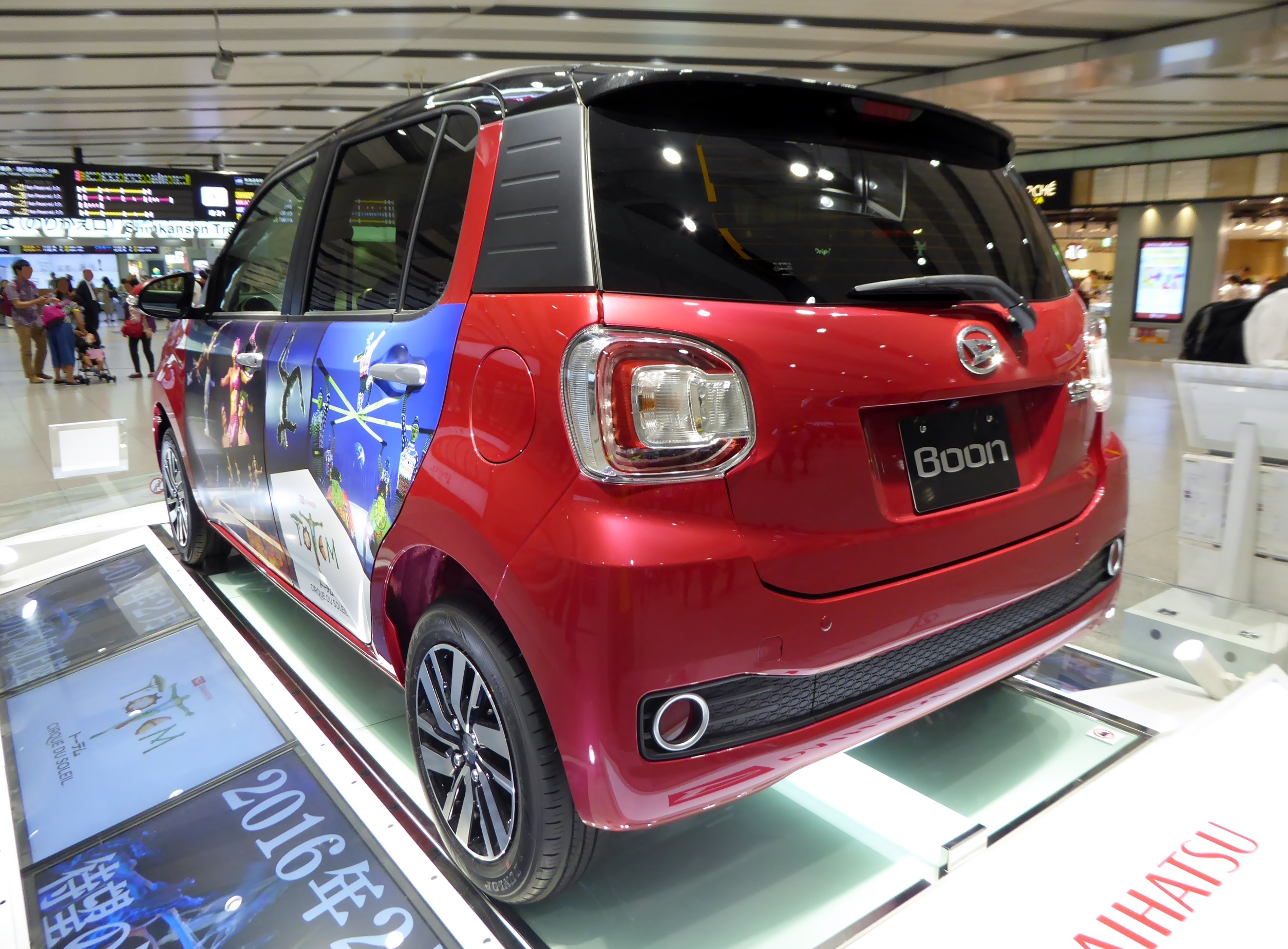
2016–2018 Boon Cilq "G Package SA II" (M700S)

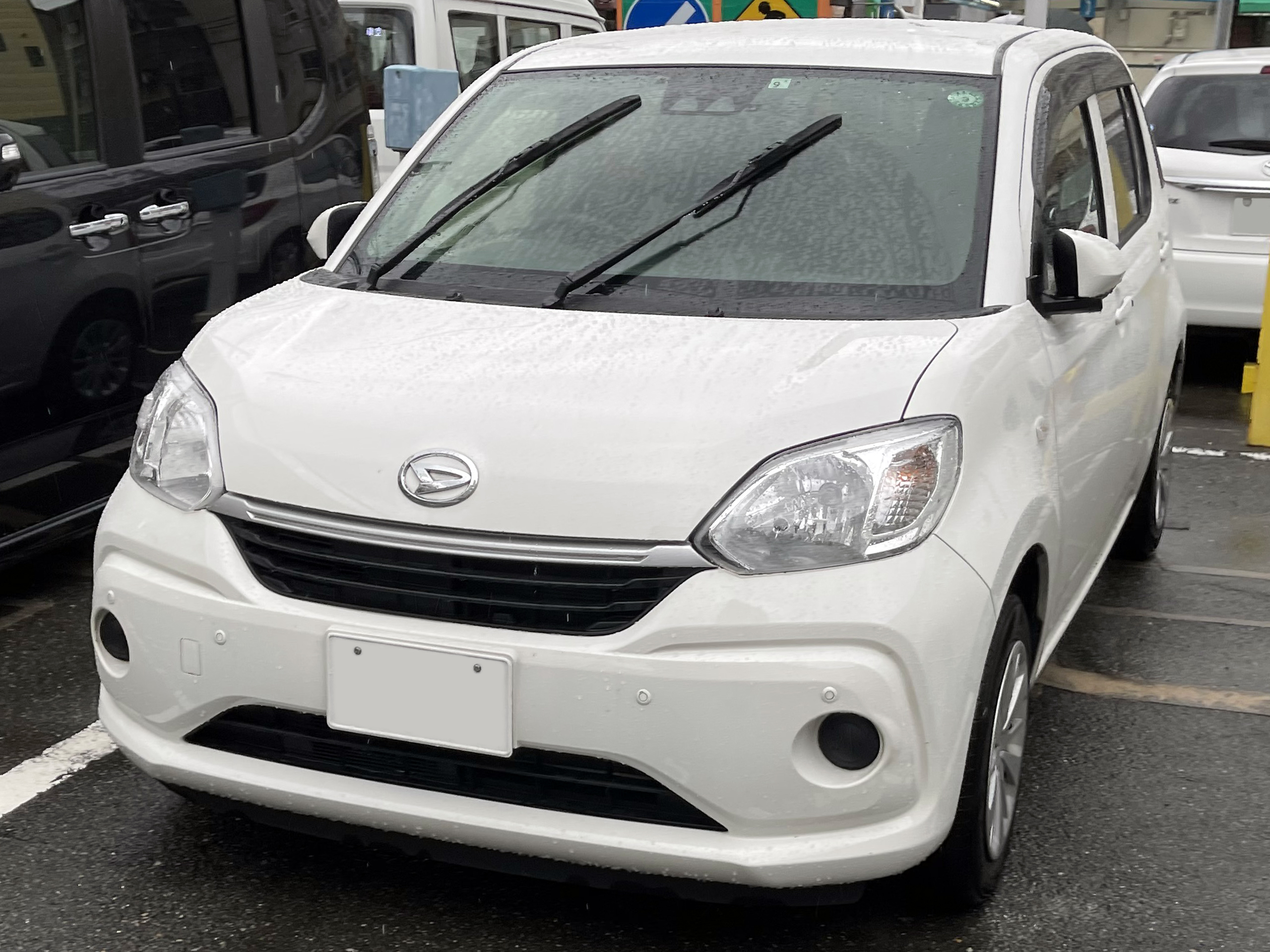
2018 Boon X "L Package SA III" (M700S)

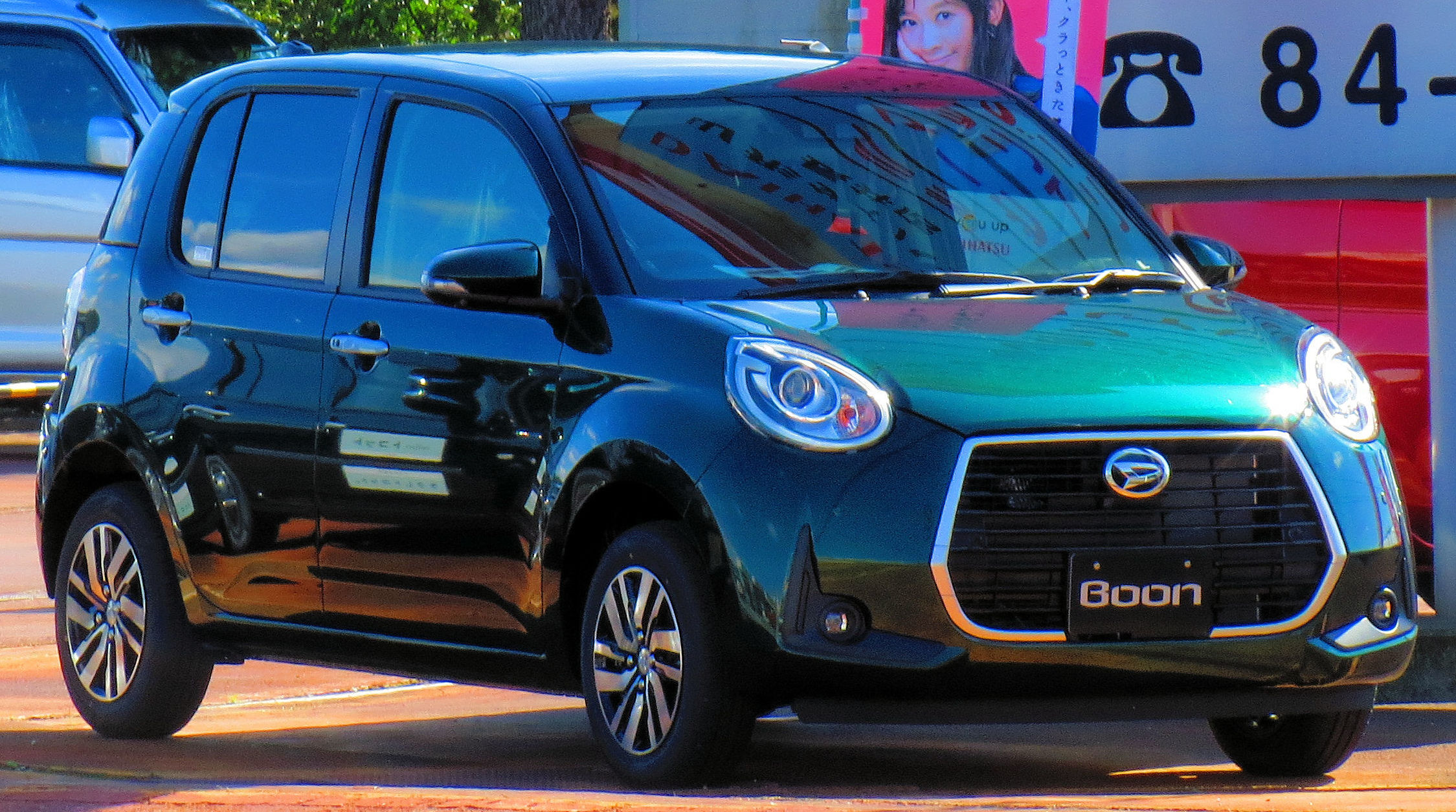
2018 Boon Cilq "G Package SA II" (M700S)

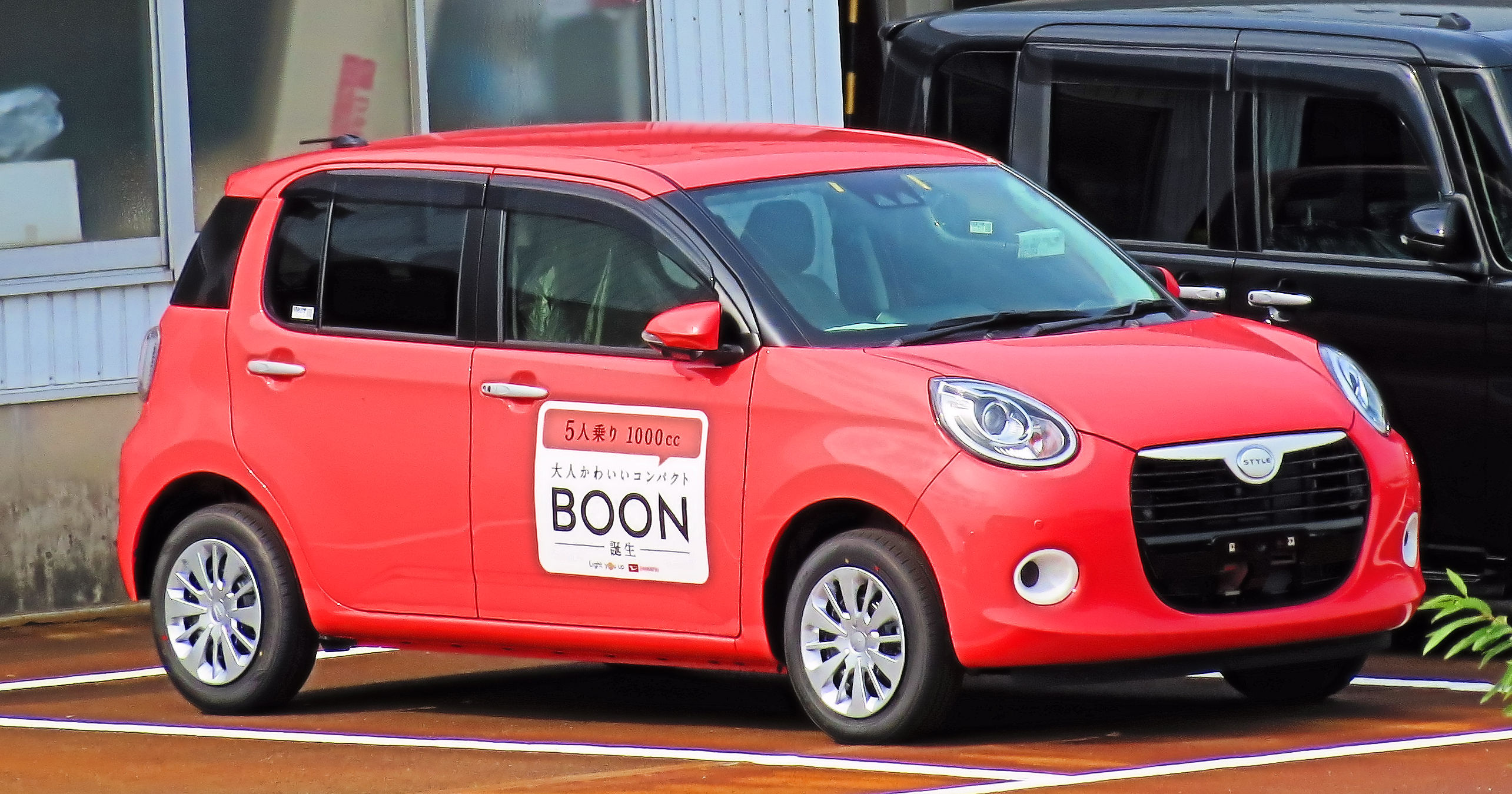
2018 Boon Style "SA III" (M700S)

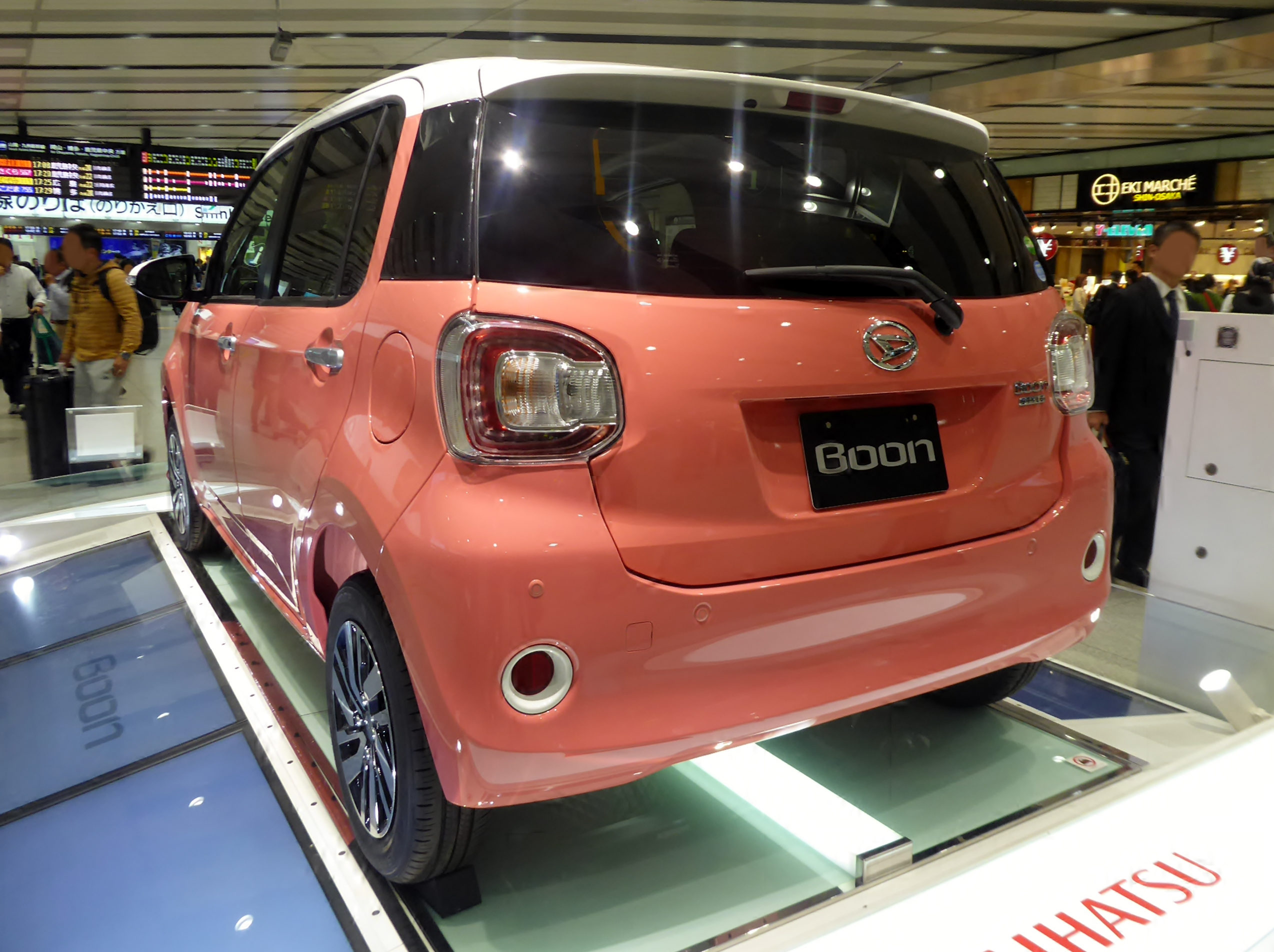
2018 Boon Style "SA III" (M700S)

==== Passo ====
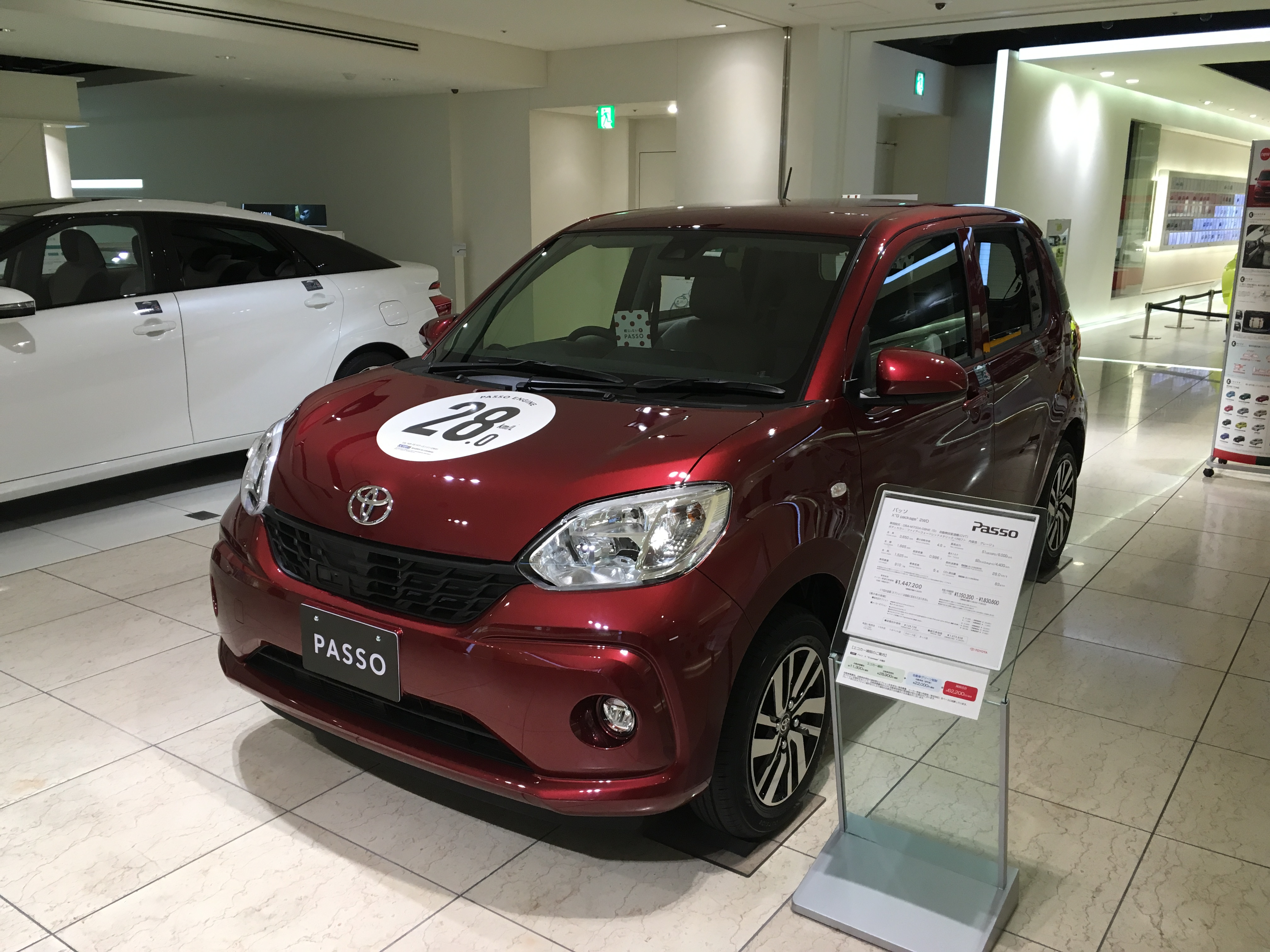
2016–2018 Passo X "G Package" (M700A)

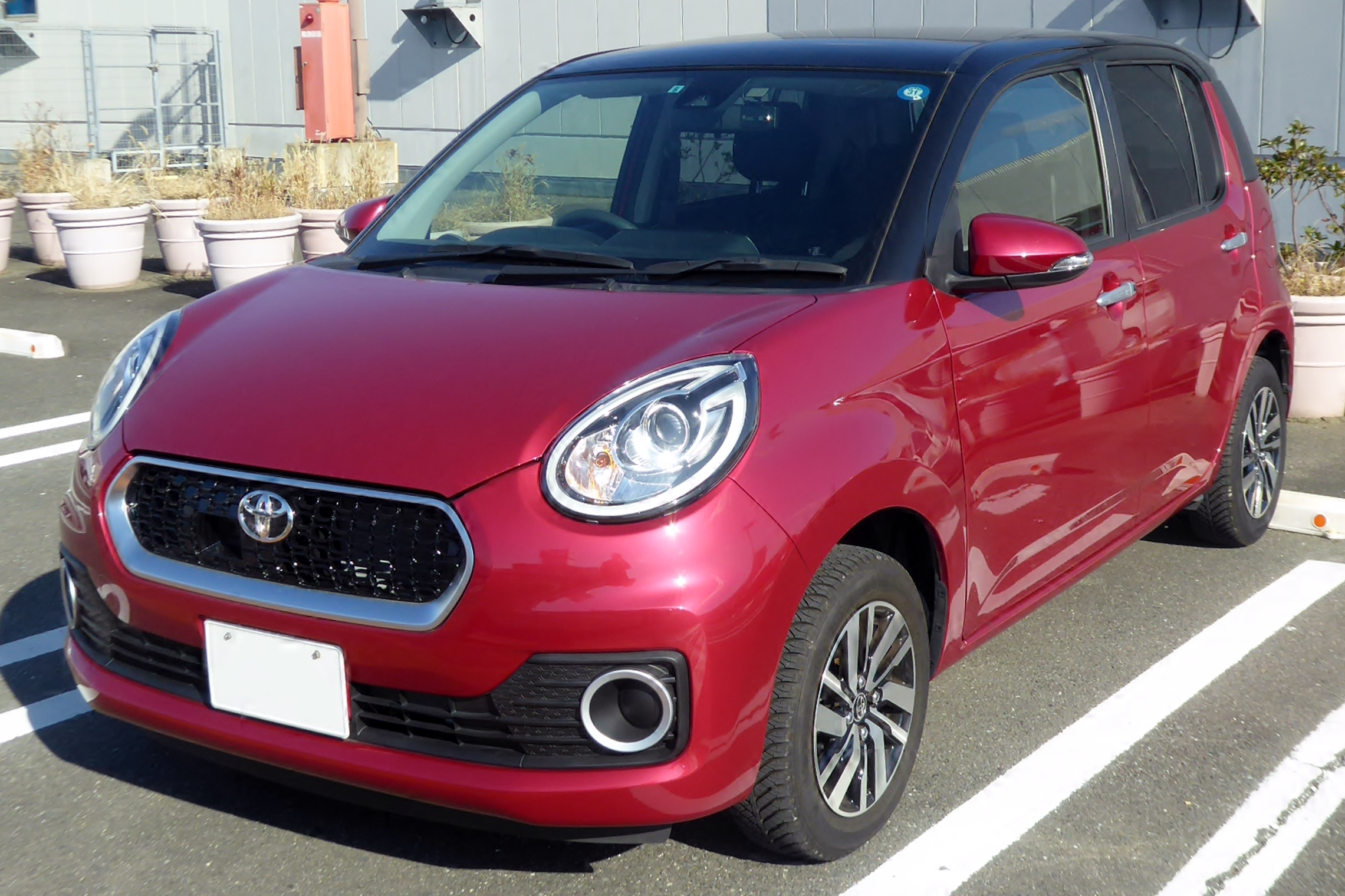
2016–2018 Passo Moda "G Package" (M700A)

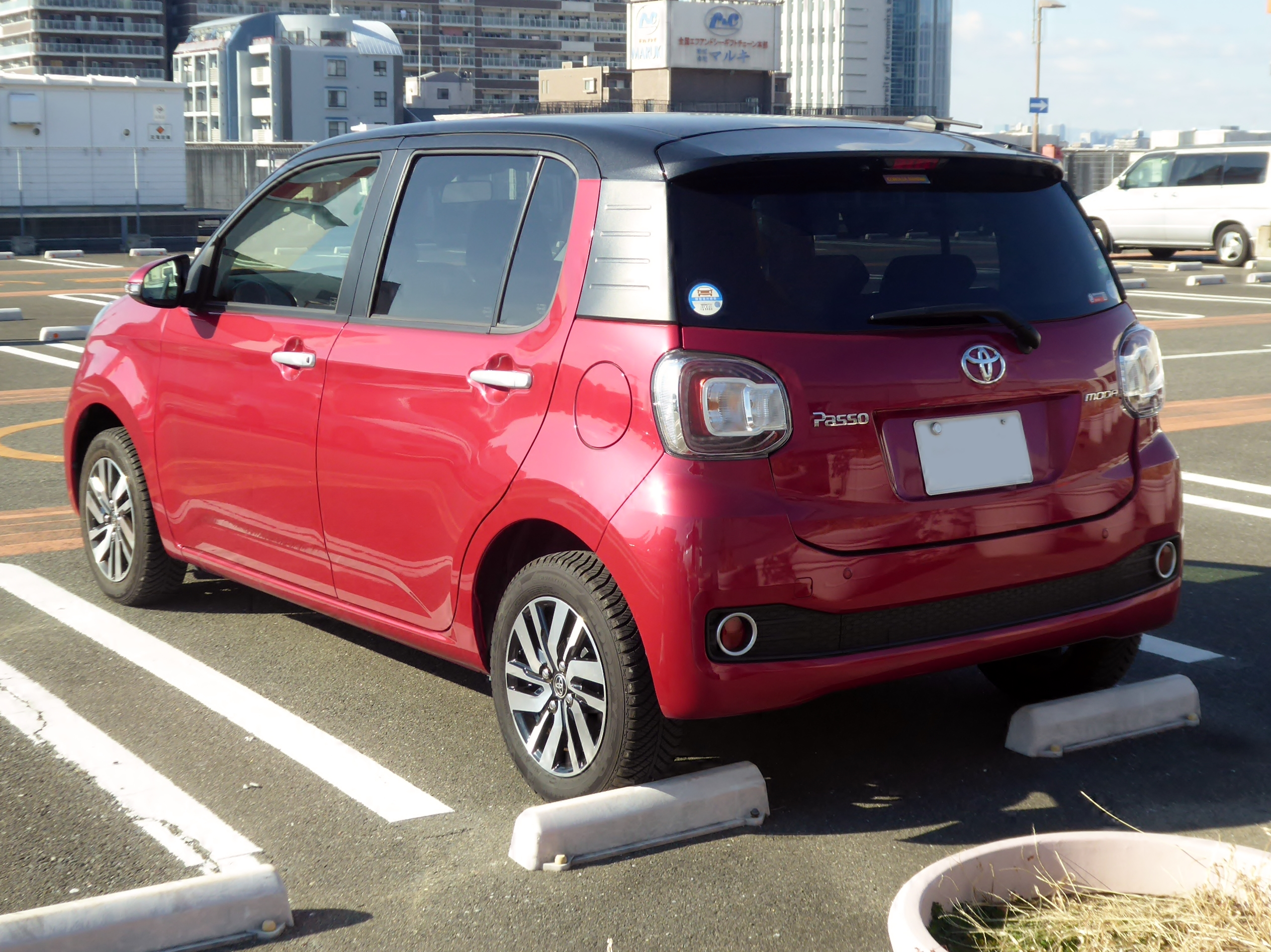
2016–2018 Passo Moda "G Package" (M700A)

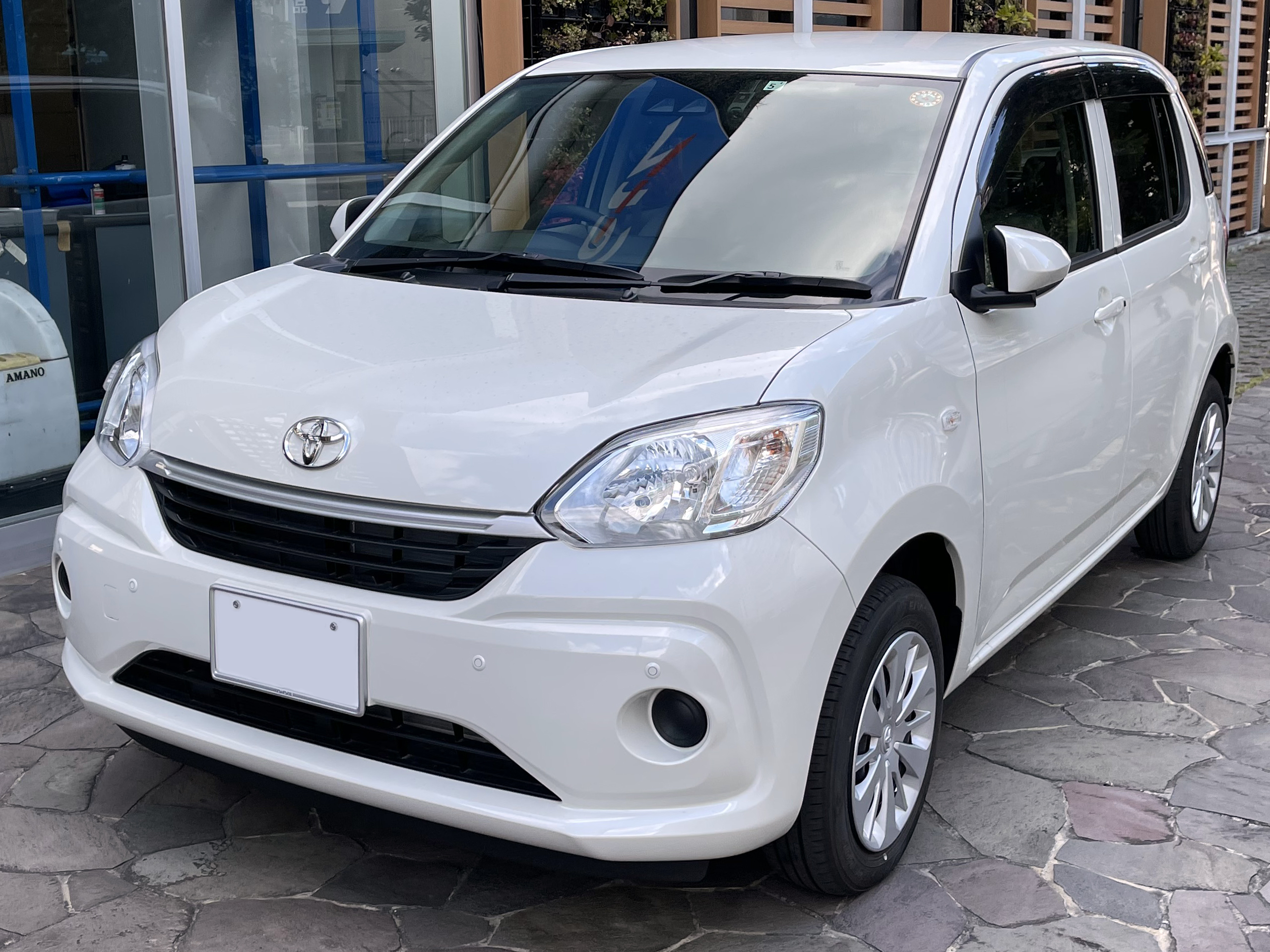
2018 Passo X "L Package S" (M700A)

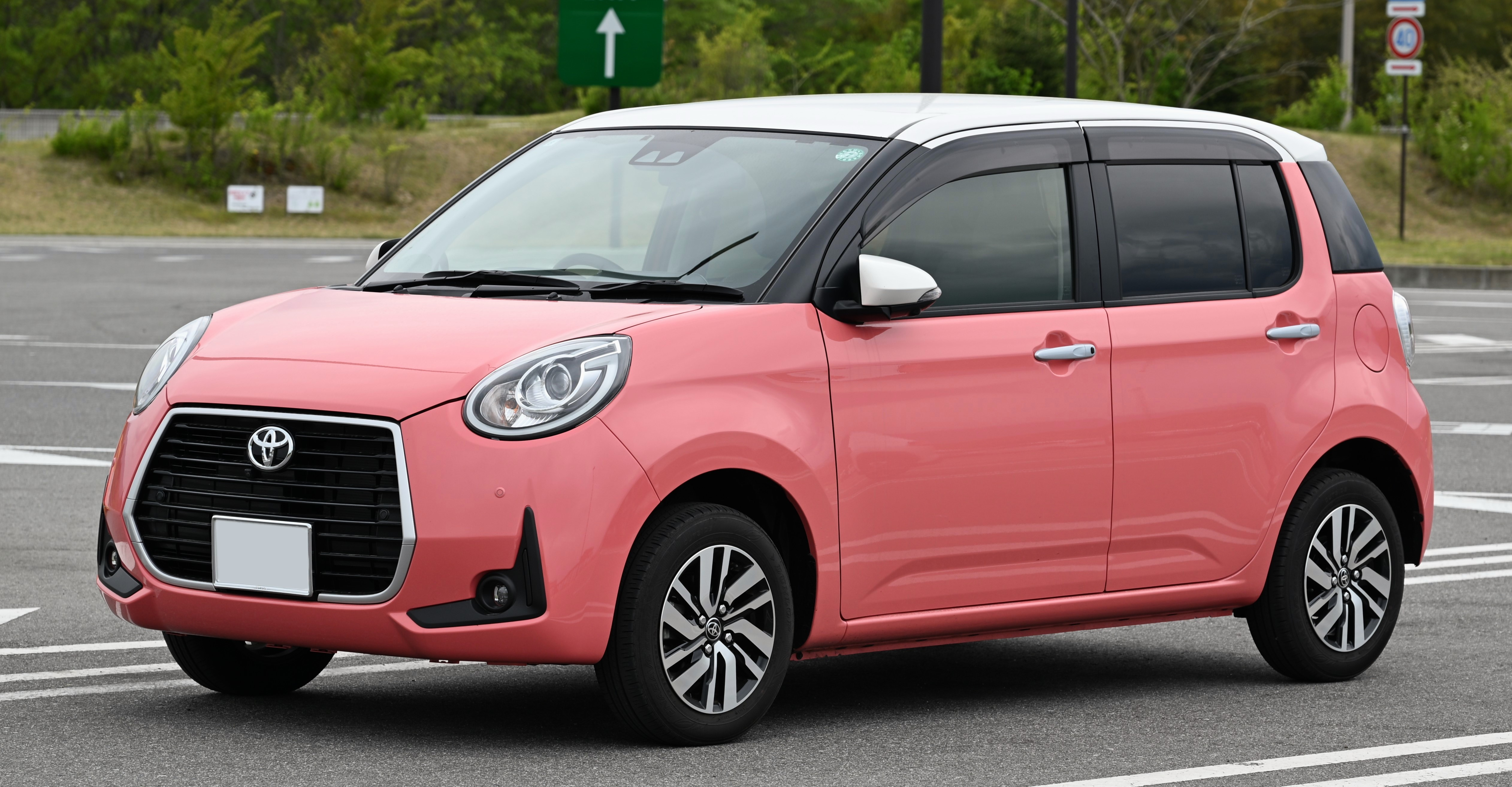
2018–2023 Passo Moda (M700A)

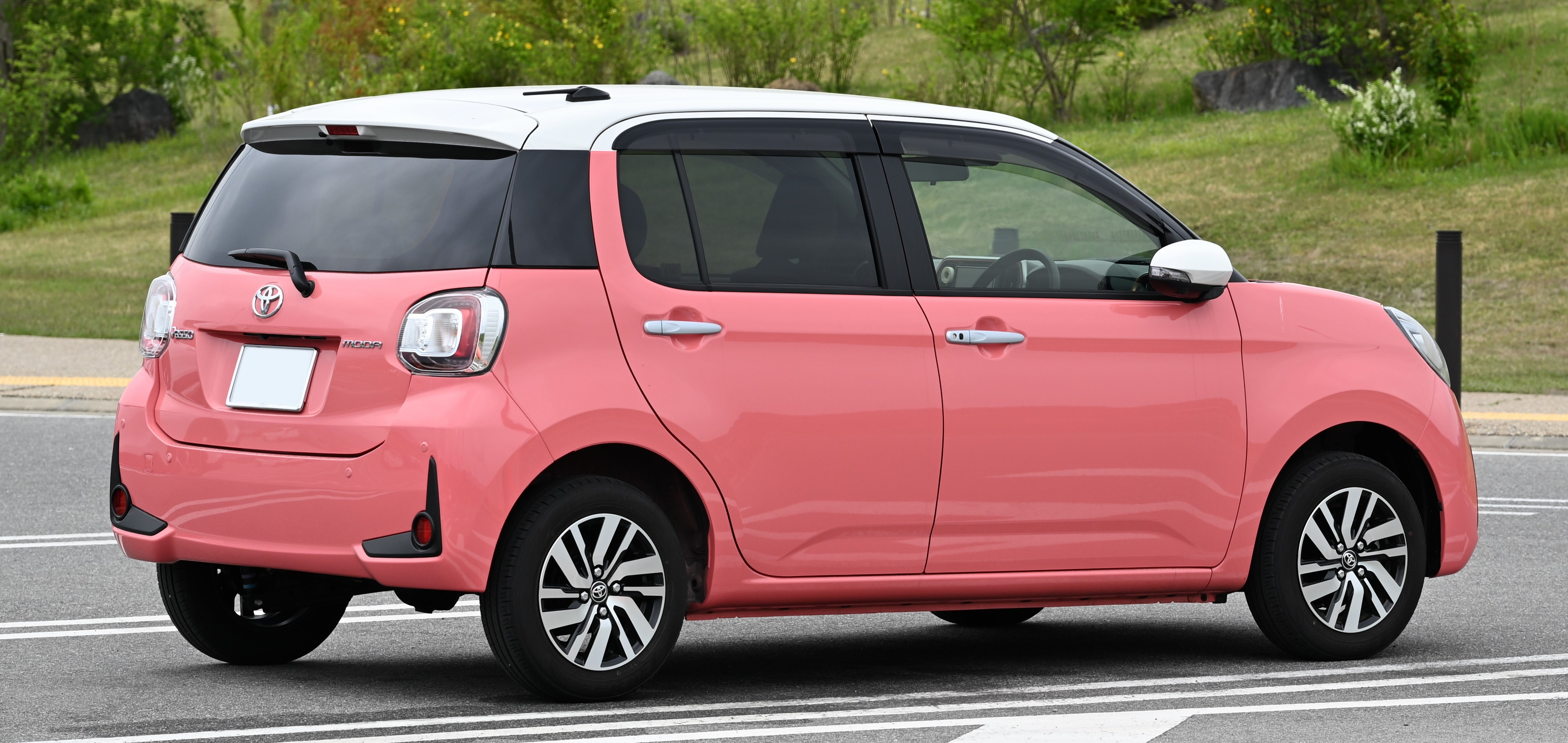
2018–2023 Passo Moda (M700A)

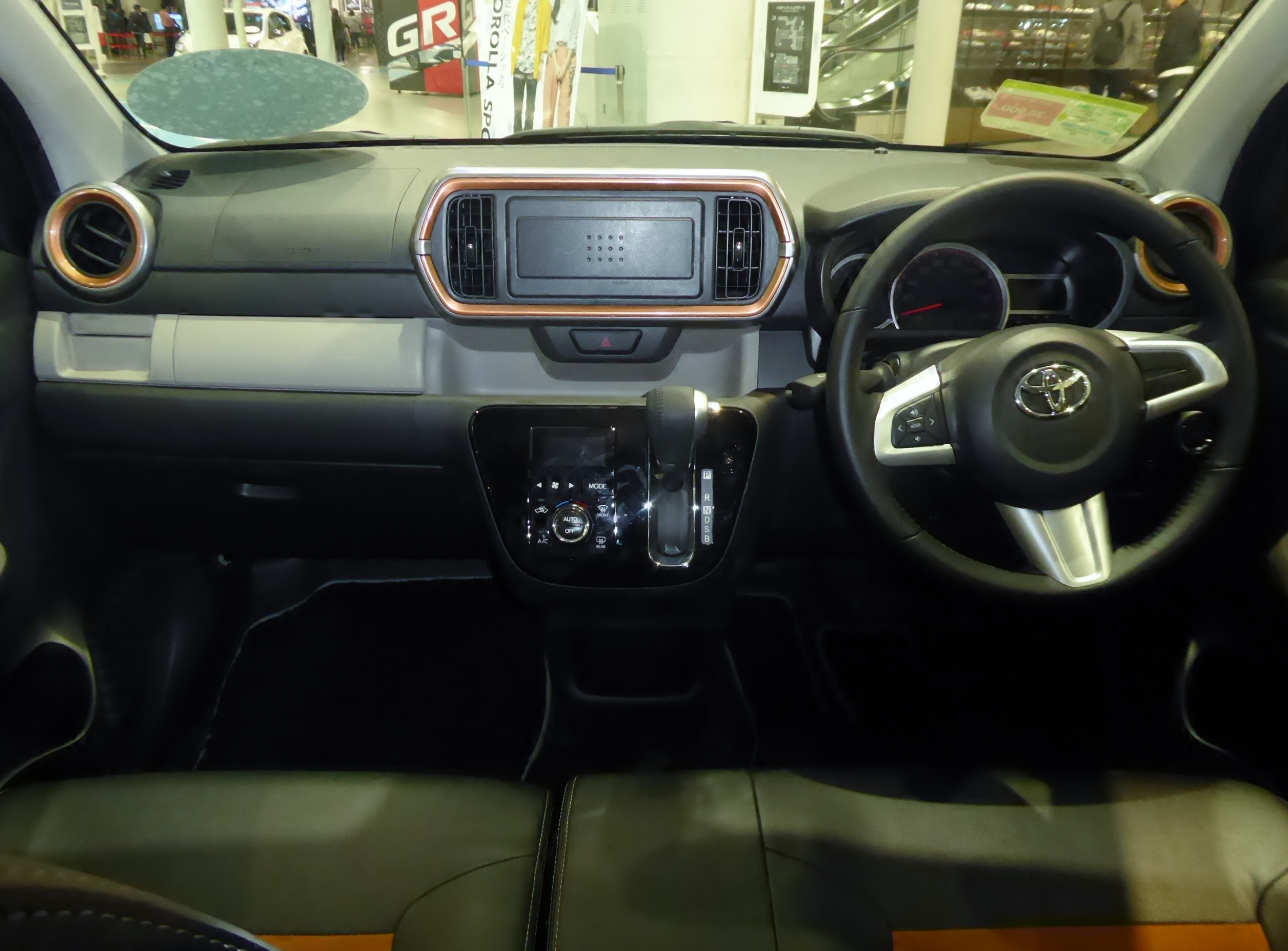
Passo Moda interior (M700A)

== Boon Luminas (M502/M512; 2008) ==
Daihatsu Boon Luminas
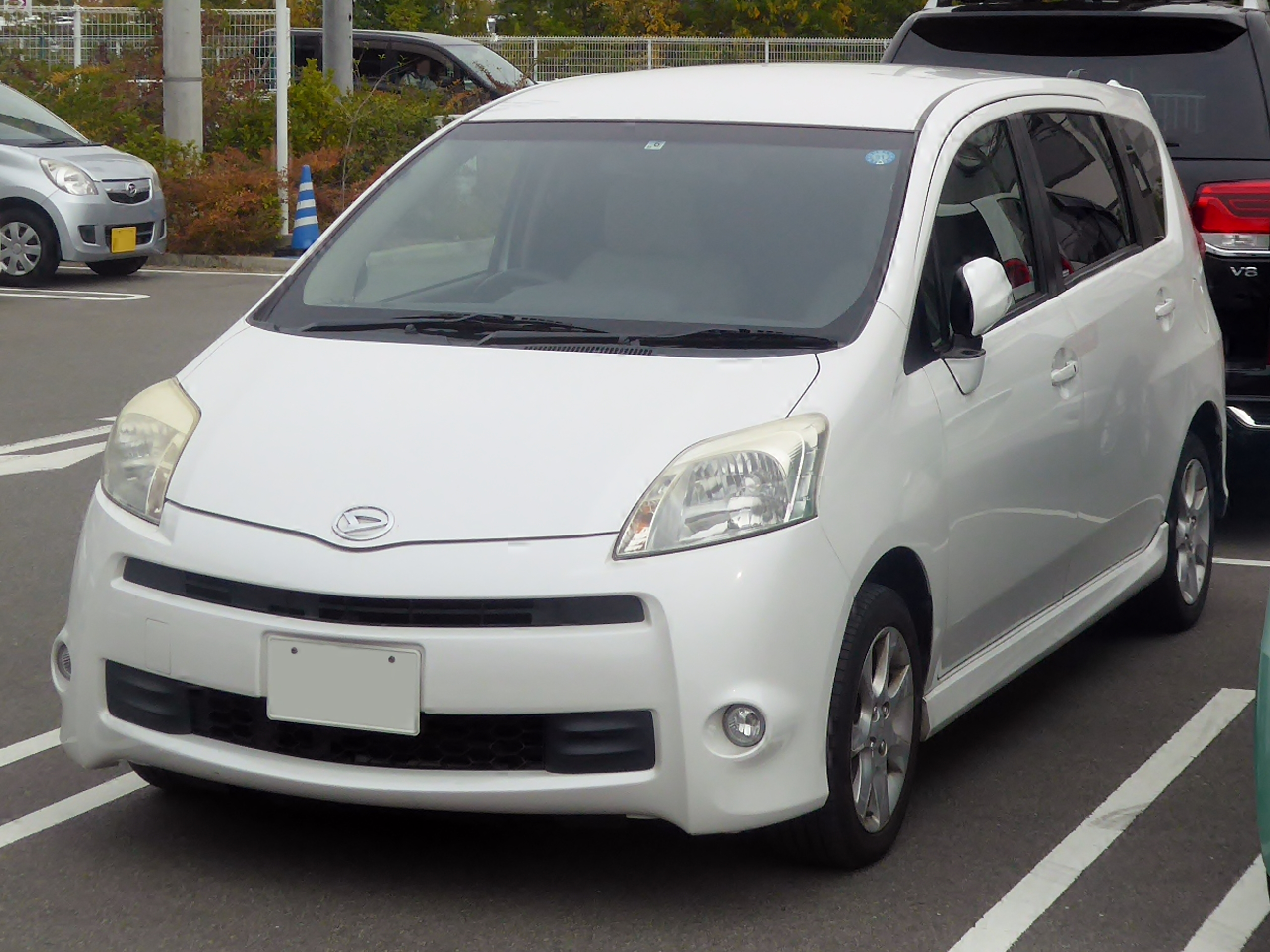
- Boon Luminas CX Aero (M502G, Japan)

Overview
- Model code: M502/M512
- Also called: Toyota Passo Sette; Perodua Alza (Malaysia, 2009–2022)
- Production: December 2008 – March 2012
- Assembly: Japan: Ōyamazaki, Kyoto; Malaysia: Rawang, Selangor (PMSB, Perodua Alza)
- Designer: Kenyuu Uehata, Masanori Hashimoto and Nobuhiro Hata

Body and chassis
- Class: Mini MPV
- Body style: 5-door minivan
- Platform: Daihatsu A platform

Powertrain
- Engine: Petrol: 1495 cc 3SZ-VE I4
- Power output: 80 kW (107 hp; 109 PS)
- Transmission: 4-speed automatic

Dimensions
- Wheelbase: 2,750 mm (108.3 in)
- Length: 4,180–4,195 mm (164.6–165.2 in)
- Width: 1,695 mm (66.7 in)
- Height: 1,620 mm (63.8 in)
- Kerb weight: 1,170–1,240 kg (2,579–2,734 lb)

Chronology
- Predecessor: Daihatsu Atrai 7; Toyota Corolla Spacio (E120) (Passo Sette)
- Successor: Daihatsu Sigra; Toyota Sienta (Passo Sette; direct); Daihatsu Mebius; Toyota Prius α (Passo Sette; indirect)

The Boon Luminas (Japanese: ダイハツ・ブーン ルミナス, Hepburn: Daihatsu Būn Ruminasu) is a minivan manufactured and sold by Daihatsu. It is a different series model based from the regular Boon, with which it is sold in parallel from 2008 until 2012. This vehicle was jointly developed with Toyota as the Passo Sette (トヨタ・パッソ セッテ), with Daihatsu handling development and production while leveraging Toyota's vehicle planning capabilities. With the launch of this vehicle, Daihatsu's minivan lineup returned after a four-year hiatus since the Atrai 7, which was discontinued in 2004.

Unlike the regular Boon/Passo, the Luminas/Sette the overall length has been increased by 580 mm, the overall width by 20 mm (0.8 in), and the overall height by 85 mm (3.3 in) compared to the Boon, and the wheelbase has also been extended from 2,440 mm (96.1 in) to 2,750 mm (108.3 in). The Luminas/Sette designed completely differently from the regular Boon/Passo and more boxier. The key consideration in the seat arrangement, including the ability to fully flatten the second and third row seats, and the ability to create combinations to suit the number of passengers and the amount of luggage.

The Boon Luminas and its OEM were manufactured in the Kyoto Plant. At the time of its discontinuation, it was the only model sold by Daihatsu that was produced at the Kyoto Plant. Early Boon Luminas grade includes: CL, and CX. The Aero package with differentiated front fascia and additional spoiler was available.

The Passo Sette was sold at the Corolla dealership. While it shares the same 1.5-litre engine, three rows of seats, and seven-passenger capacity as the first-generation Sienta, there are significant differences: the Sienta uses the Toyota NBC platform, and a sliding doors; while the Passo Sette used the Daihatsu A Platform.

The Luminas/Sette is the derivative model from the Boon/Passo. Powered by a 1495 cc 3SZ-VE I4 engine, the same engine that used by Daihatsu Coo and Gran Max (rebadged as Toyota TownAce/LiteAce). All models were equipped with a 4-speed automatic transmission with an instrument panel shifter. The 1495 cc 3SZ-VE produces 109 PS (80 kW; 108 bhp) and 141 N⋅m (104 lb⋅ft).

In Malaysia, the Luminas was rebadged and sold as the Perodua Alza. The car was introduced on 23 November 2009, and was offered in 1.5 Standard (EZ and SX) and Premium (EZi and SXi) with the 1495 cc 3SZ-VE DOHC engine.

The Sette, which had suffered a disastrous decline in sales, partly due to the impact of reintroduction the first-generation Sienta, in May 2011. The Luminas/Sette sale the Luminas and Sette were ceased in 2012.

Boon Luminas

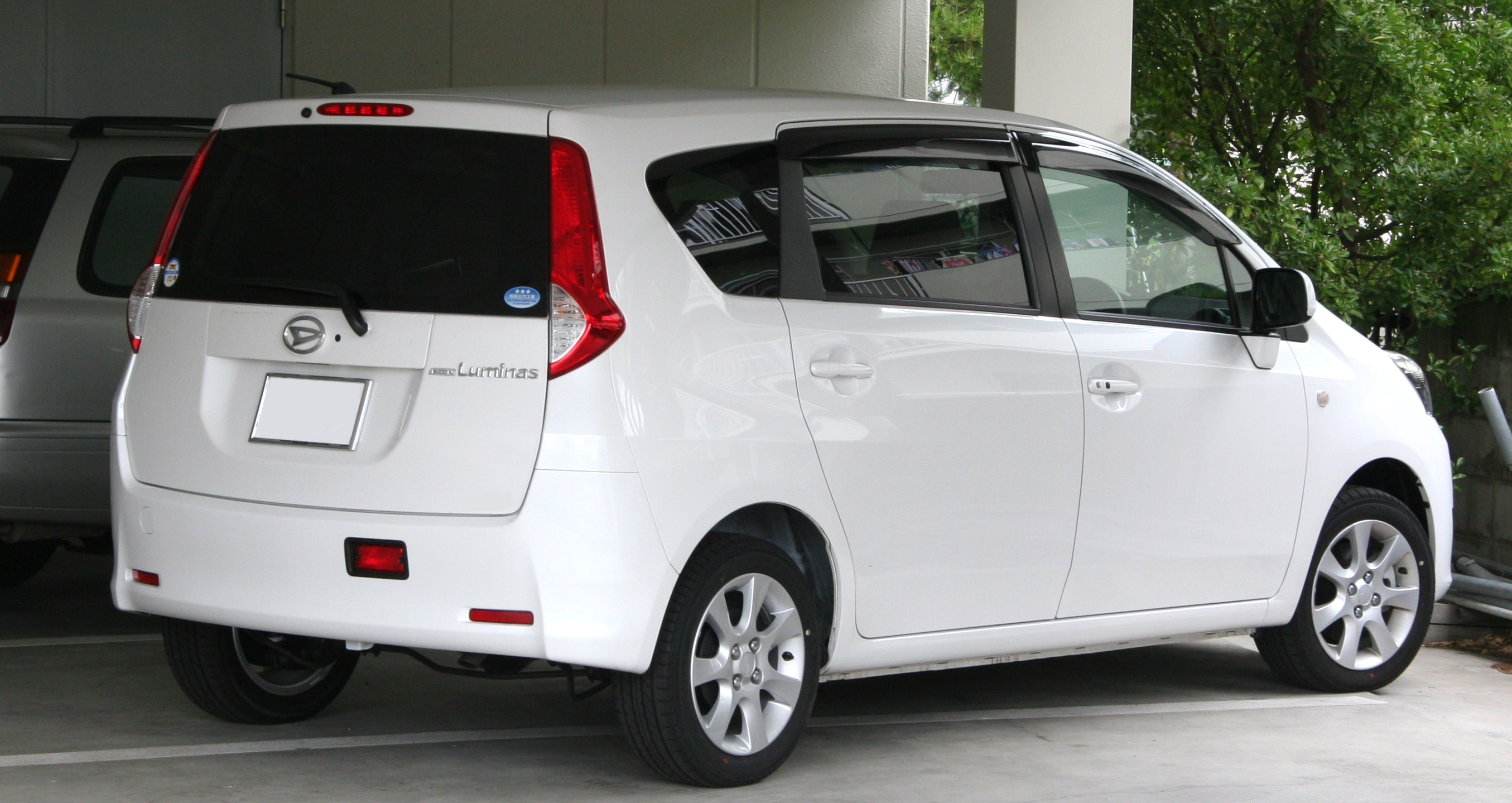
Boon Luminas (M502G, Japan)

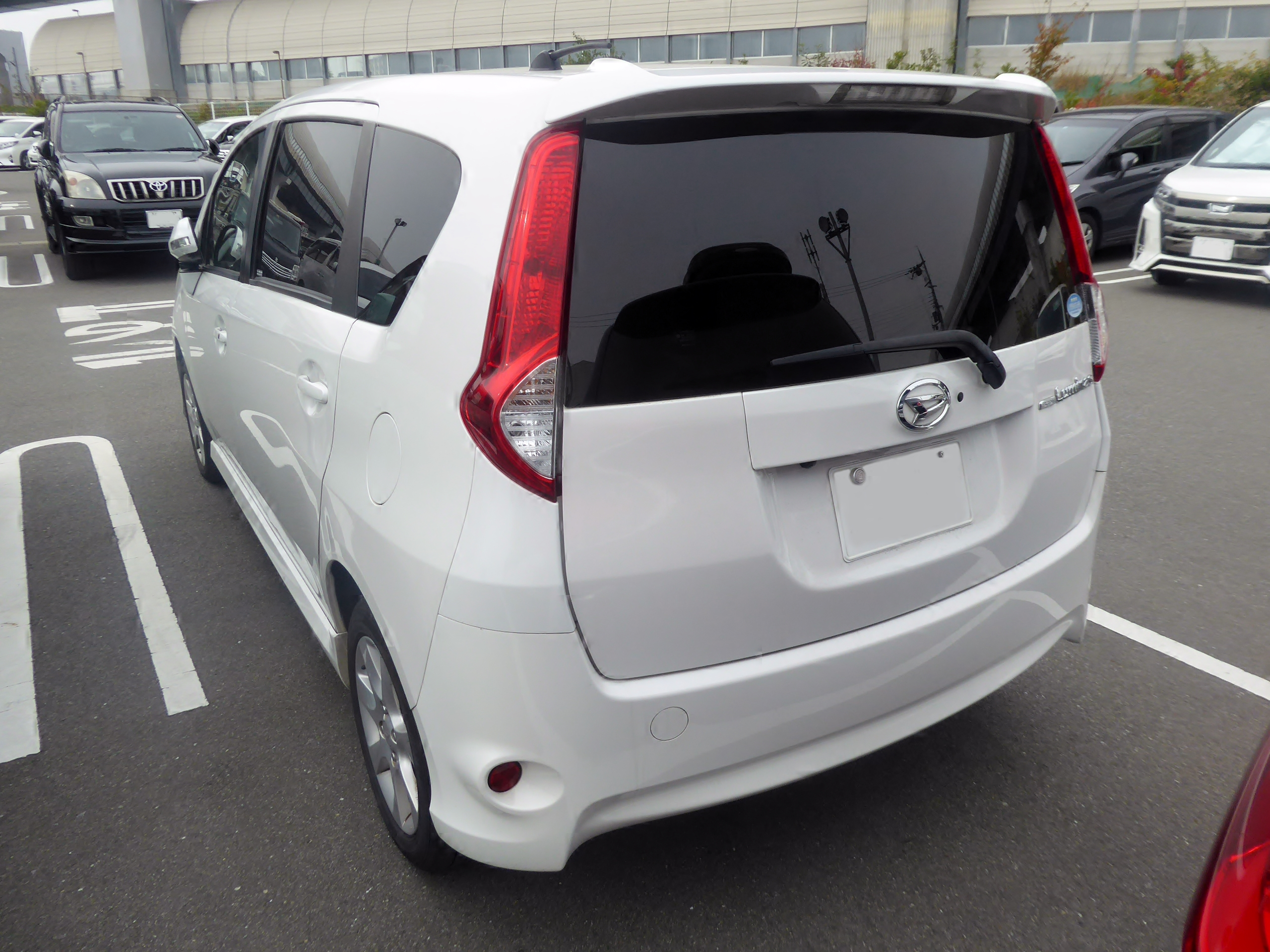
Boon Luminas CX Aero (M502G, Japan)

Passo Sette

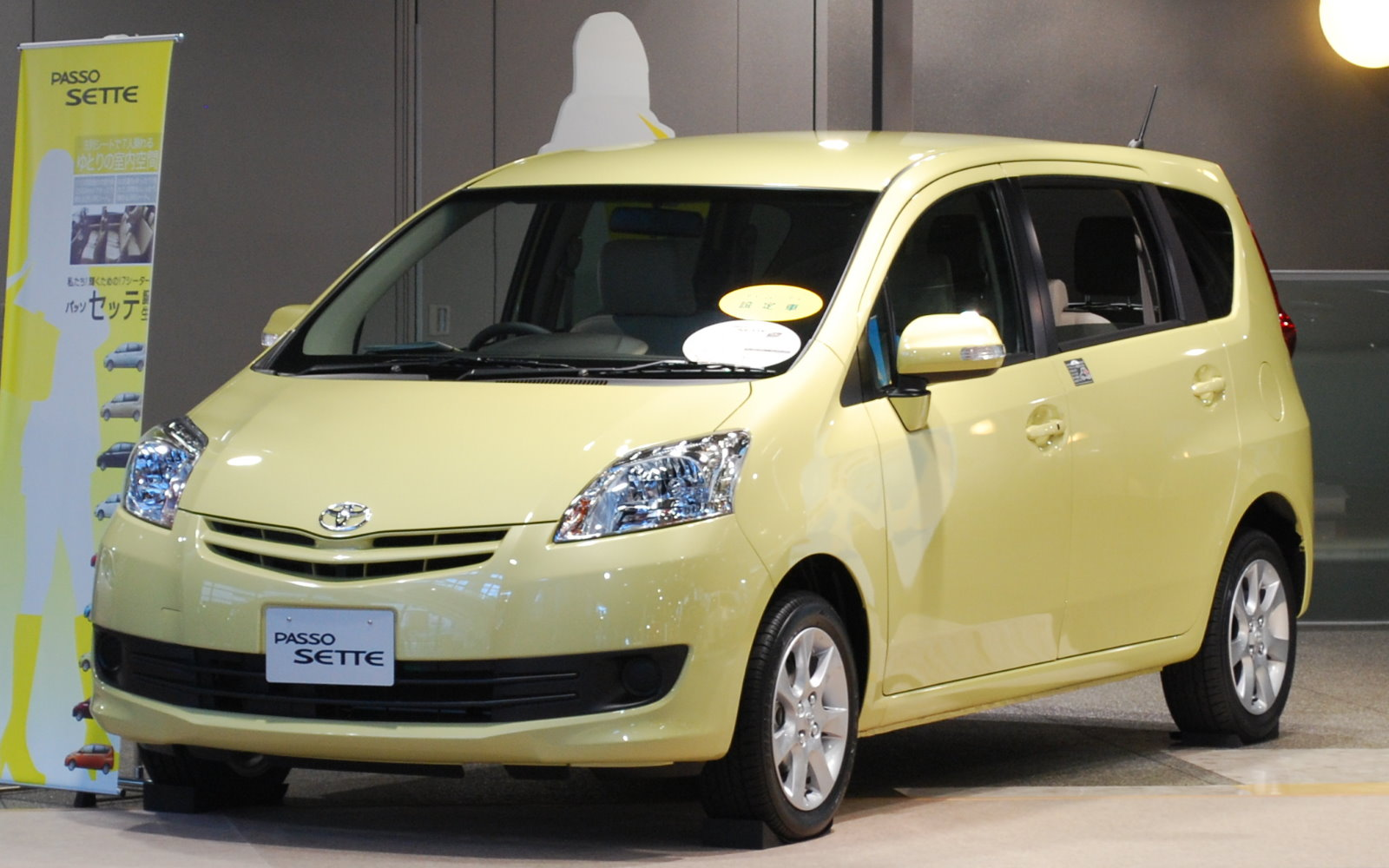
Passo Sette G (M502E, Japan)

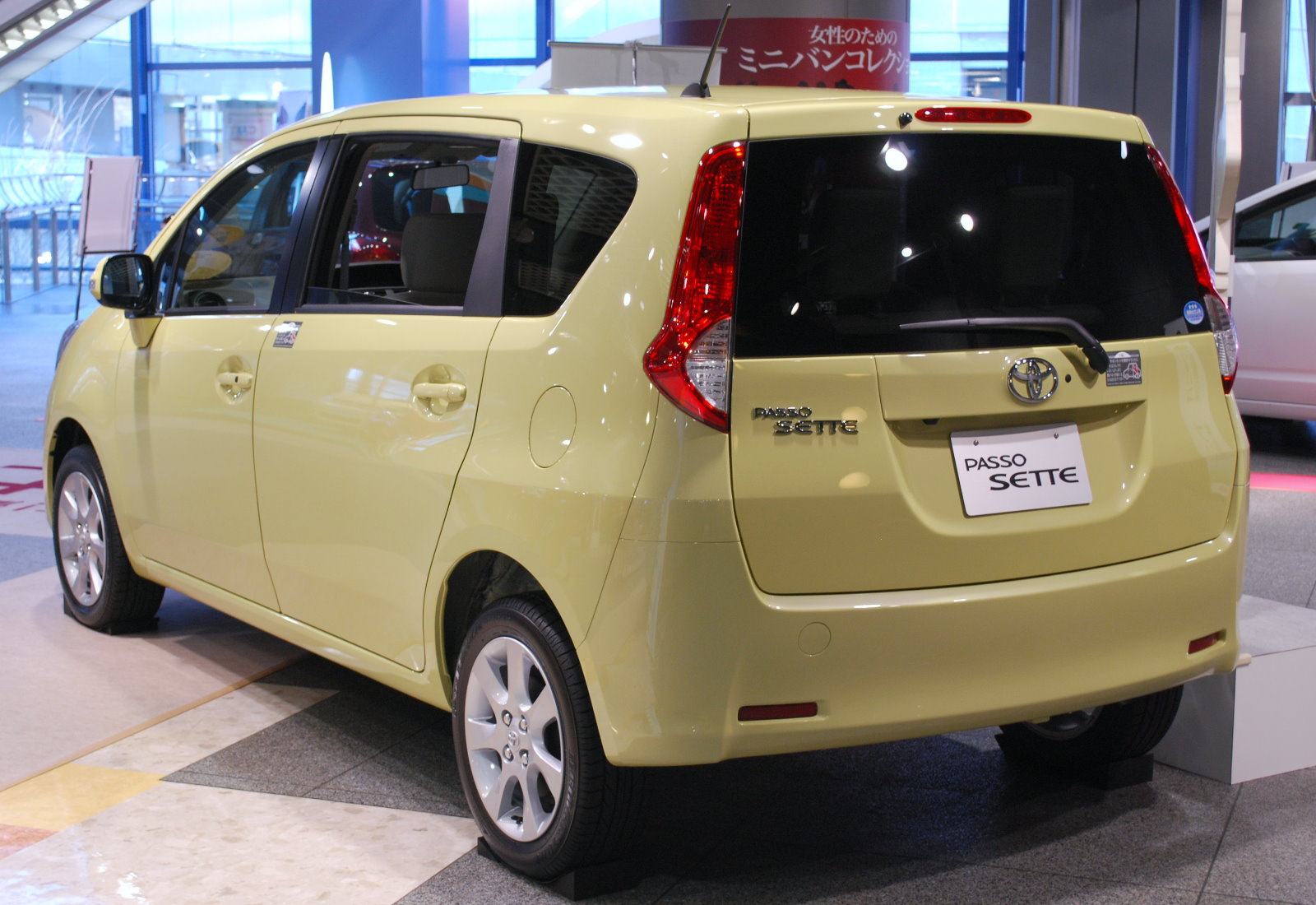
Passo Sette G (M502E, Japan)

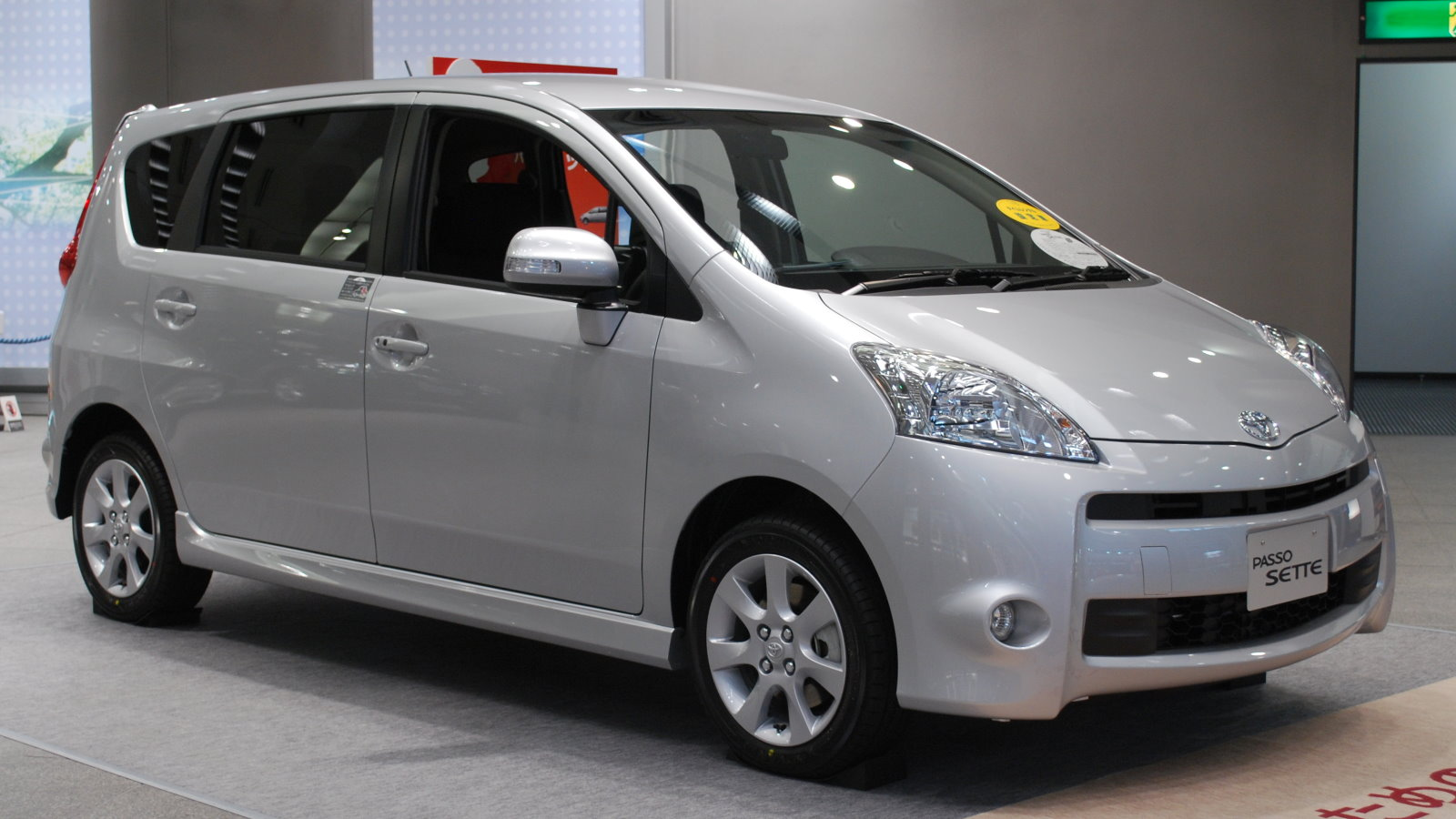
Passo Sette S (M502E, Japan)

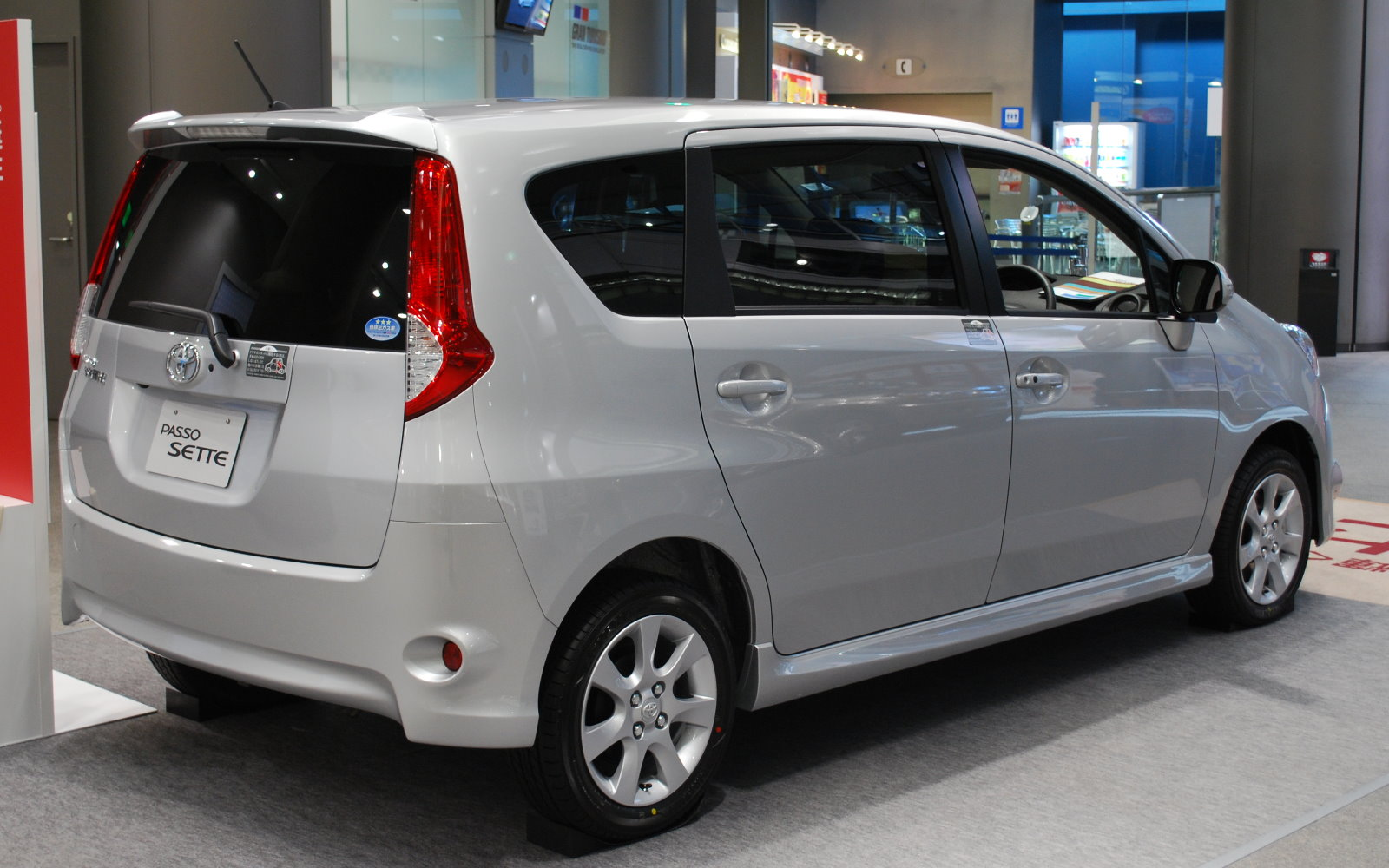
Passo Sette S (M502E, Japan)

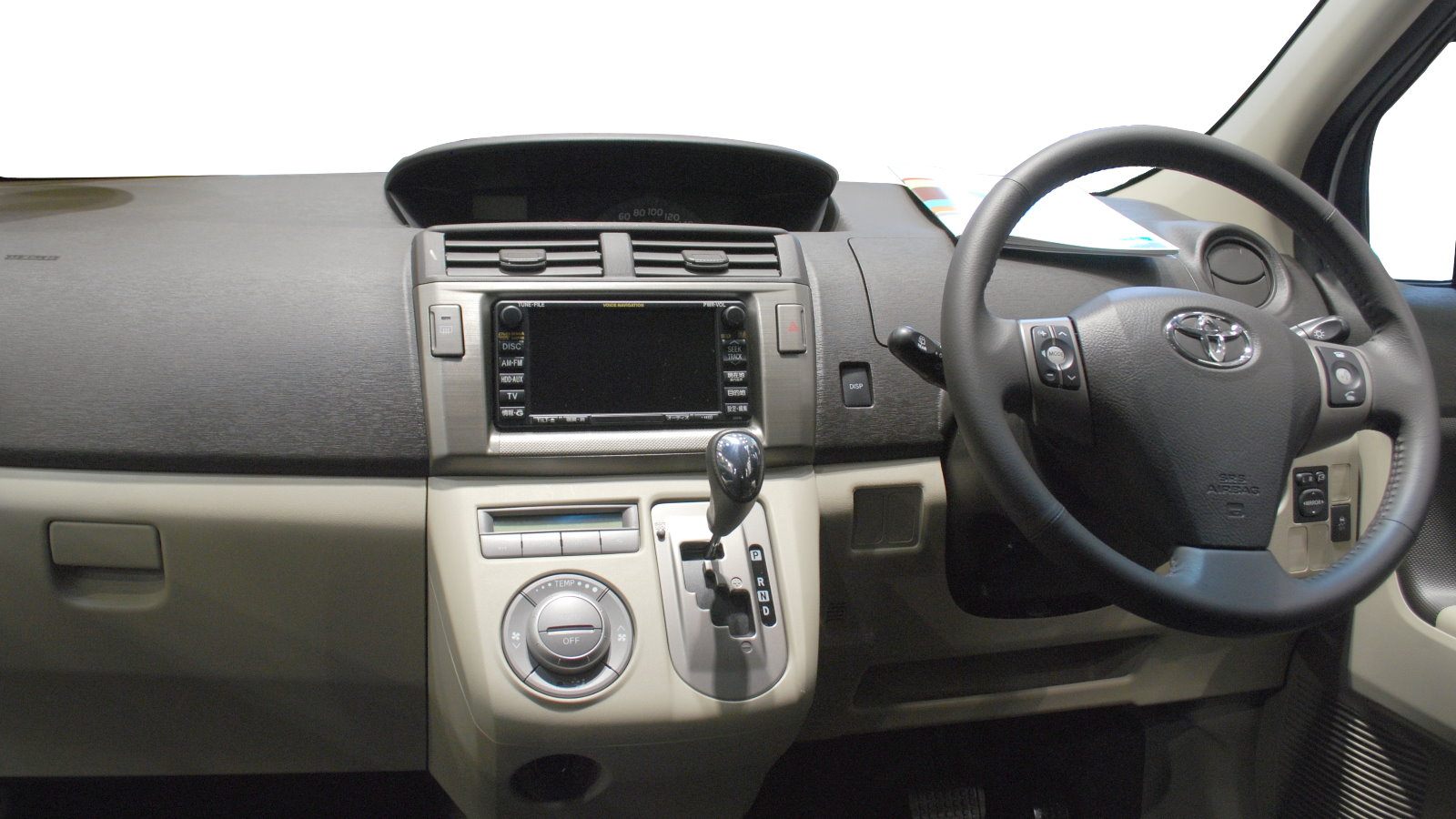
Passo Sette interior (Japan)

== Sales ==
Year	Japan
2004	68,984
2005	87,956
2006	72,099
2007	80,015
2008	72,767
2009	83,593
2010	87,109
2011	52,513
2012	52,281
2013	42,805
2014	49,770
2015	45,449
2016	70,381
2017	54,186
2018	47,871
2019	40,980
2020	32,968
2021	32,542
2022	32,990
2023	24,880
