= Perodua Myvi =

Malaysian subcompact car

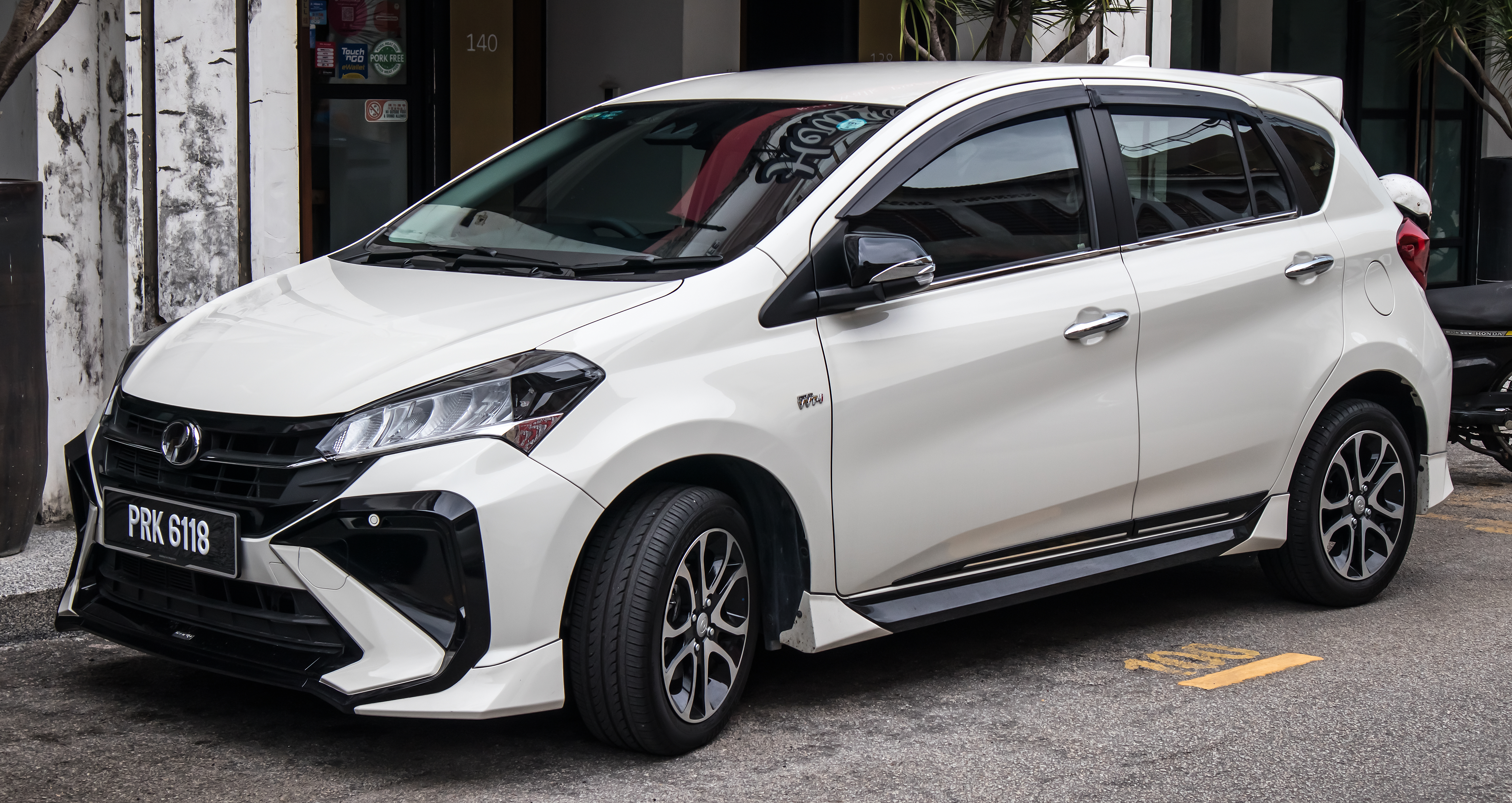
- Current Myvi (facelift) with GearUp bodykit

Overview
- Manufacturer: Perodua
- Also called: Daihatsu Boon/Sirion (Japan/international, 2005–2017); Daihatsu Sirion (Indonesia, 2007–present)
- Production: May 2005 – present
- Assembly: Malaysia: Rawang, Selangor (PMSB)

Body and chassis
- Class: Subcompact car/Supermini (B)
- Body style: 5-door hatchback
- Layout: Front-engine, front-wheel-drive

The Perodua Myvi is a subcompact car/supermini (B-segment) produced by the Malaysian manufacturer Perodua since 2005. Based on the Daihatsu Boon (also branded as Daihatsu Sirion, Toyota Passo and Subaru Justy), the Myvi is the result of Perodua's collaboration with both Toyota and Daihatsu. However, the third generation Myvi was entirely designed and made in Malaysia, thus not being based on the third generation Boon. The Myvi was the best-selling car in Malaysia for nine consecutive years, between 2006 and 2014, and again between the years 2018 and 2022. The Myvi has been Malaysia's best-selling car for 14 years since its first full year of sales in 2006. By the end of 2024, the Myvi reached 1.487 million units sold since the launch of its first generation in 2005 as Perodua's best-selling nameplate.

The name "Myvi" is derived from "My Vehicle," "My Vision" and "Malaysian Vision."

== First generation (M300; 2005) ==
First generation
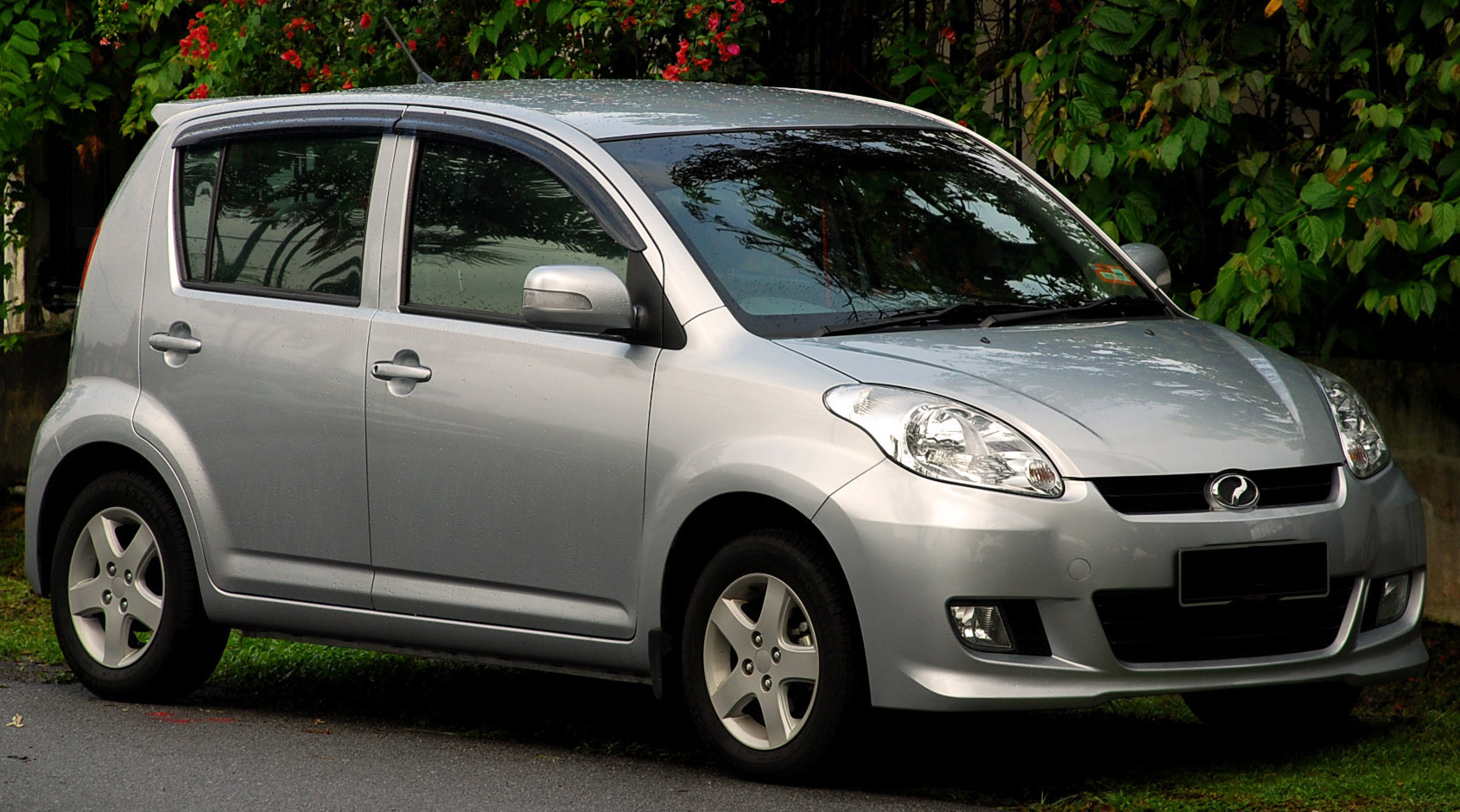

Overview
- Model code: M300
- Also called: Daihatsu Boon (Japan/international); Daihatsu Sirion (international/Indonesia); Subaru Justy
- Production: May 2005 – June 2011

Body and chassis
- Related: Perodua Alza (M500)

Powertrain
- Engine: 1.0 L EJ-VE I3; 1.3 L K3-VE I4
- Transmission: 5-speed manual; 4-speed automatic

Dimensions
- Wheelbase: 2,440 mm (96.1 in)
- Length: 3,630–3,720 mm (142.9–146.5 in)
- Width: 1,665 mm (65.6 in)
- Height: 1,550 mm (61.0 in)
- Kerb weight: 900–955 kg (1,984–2,105 lb)

The first generation Myvi was unveiled and launched on 25 May 2005, being the first B-segment hatchback Perodua ever produced and heavily based on the first-generation Daihatsu Boon/Sirion. Previously, Perodua mainly produces A-segment cars based on Daihatsu kei cars. The company intended it to be a niche model in a sedan-dominated mainstream market at that time. Perodua expected the Myvi to sell 4,000 Myvis monthly. By August 2005, Perodua had received 52,000 bookings which were around 10 percent of the annual automobile sales in Malaysia, while Perodua was only able to deliver about 10,000 cars up to the date. By the second half of 2006, orders have been averaging 7,000 units a month.

=== Equipment level ===
The Myvi was made available in five trim levels: 1.0SR (five-speed manual), 1.3SX (five-speed manual), 1.3EZ (four-speed auto), 1.3SXi (five-speed manual) and 1.3EZi "Premium" (four-speed auto). Also made available was a Myvi "Special Edition" featuring a body kit encompassing modified bumpers, side skirts and a spoiler. The Myvi was also made available with dual airbags and ABS (1.3 premium only).

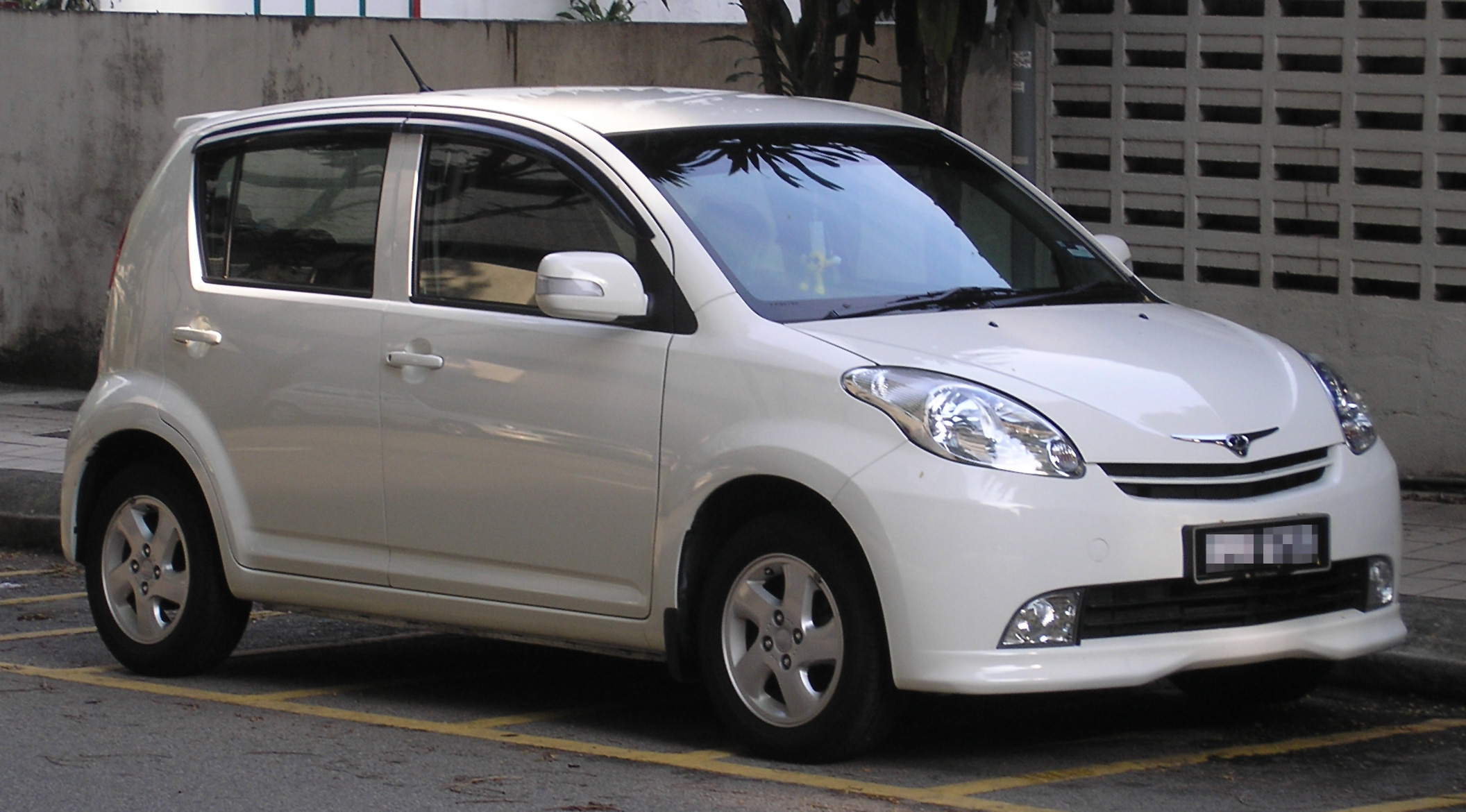
2005–2008 Myvi

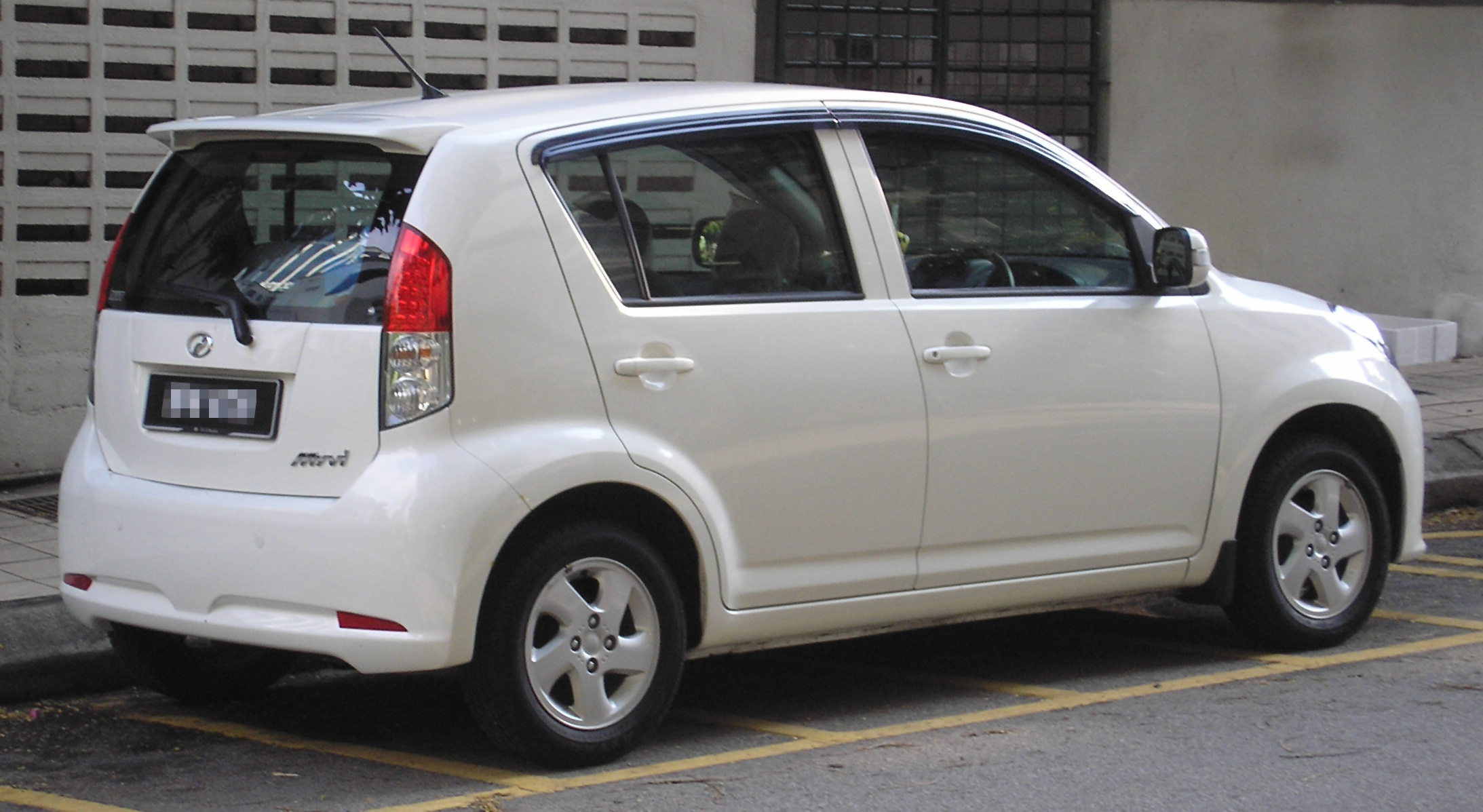
2005–2008 Myvi

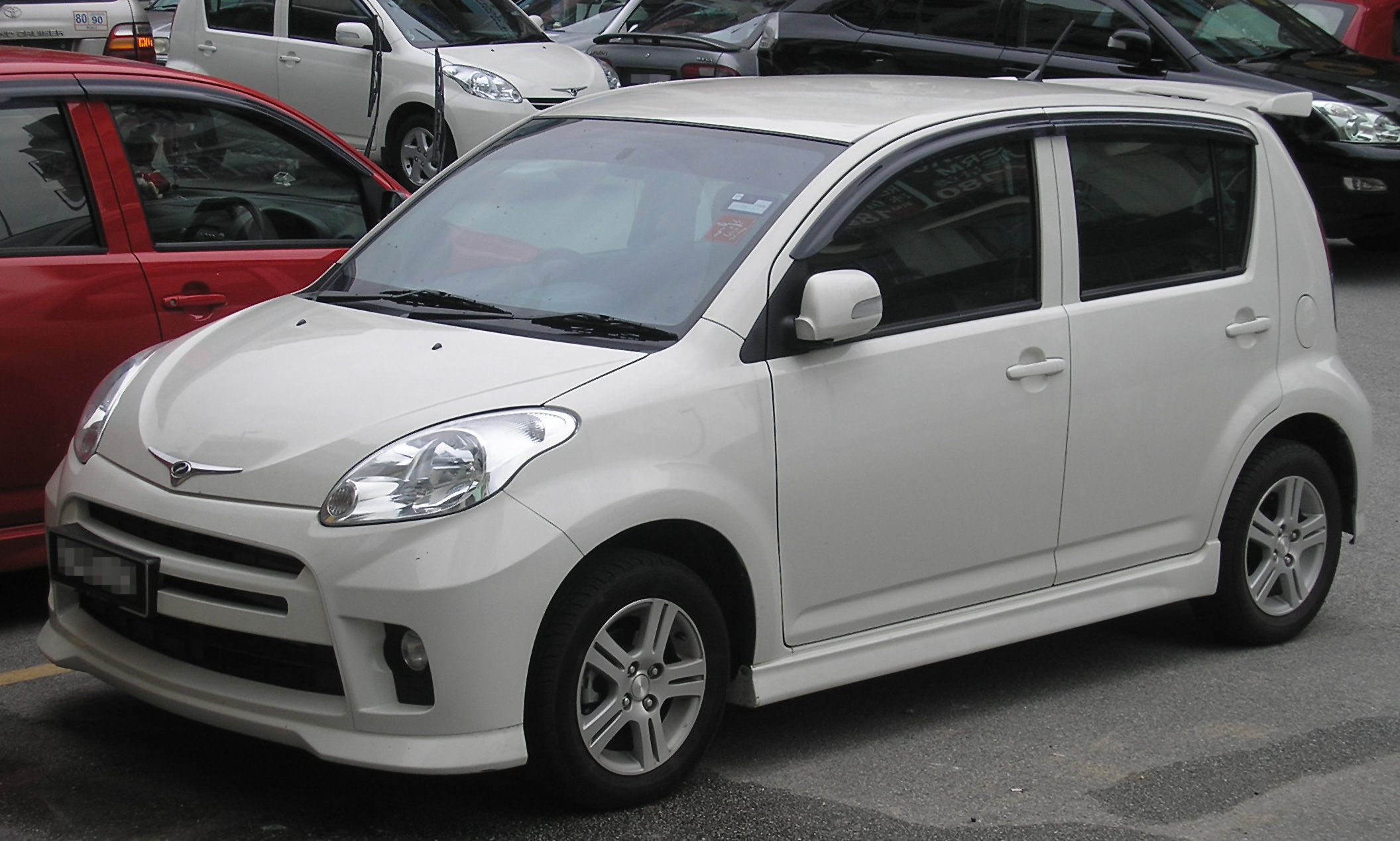
2007–2008 Myvi SE

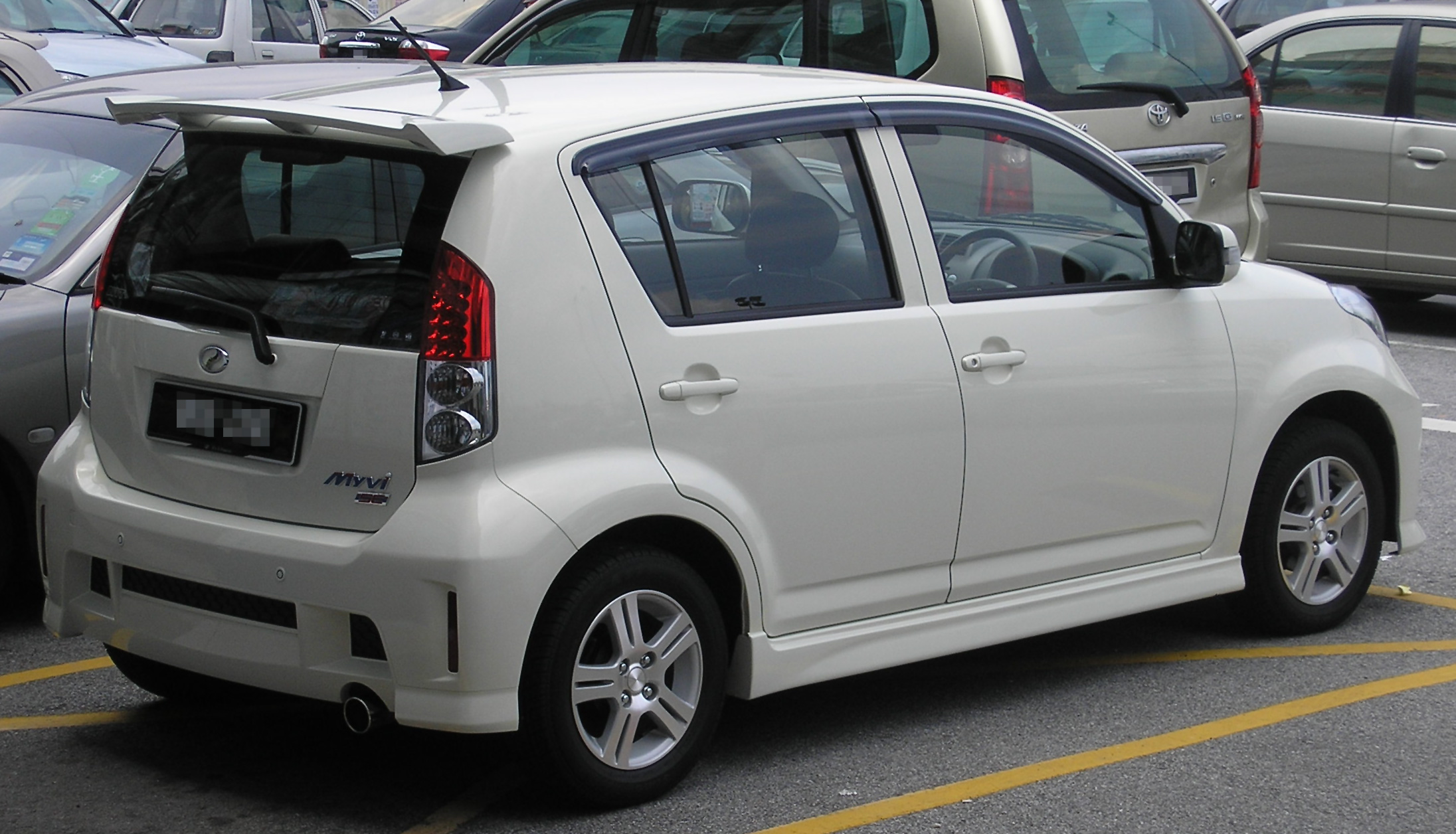
2007–2008 Myvi SE

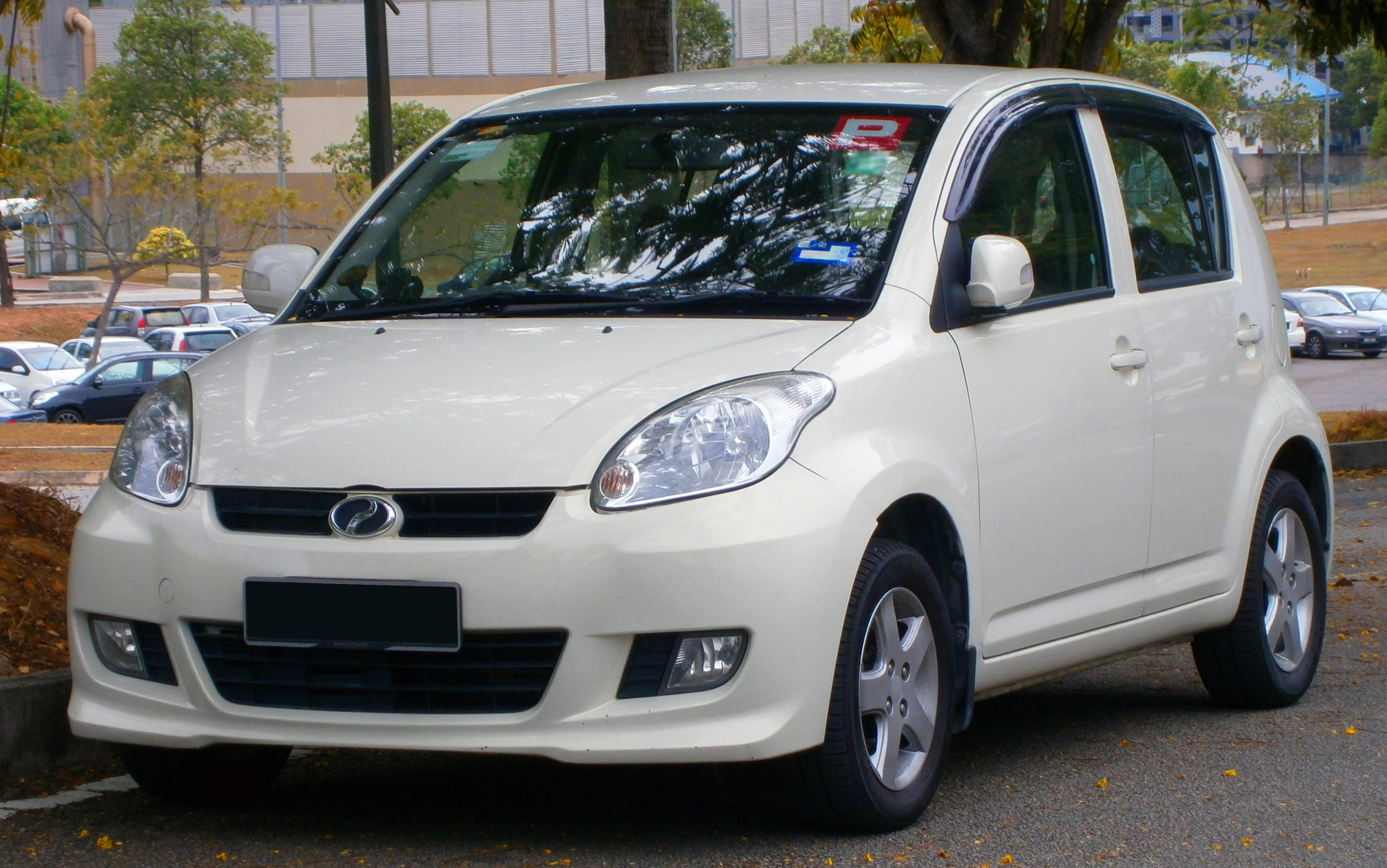
2008–2011 Myvi Standard

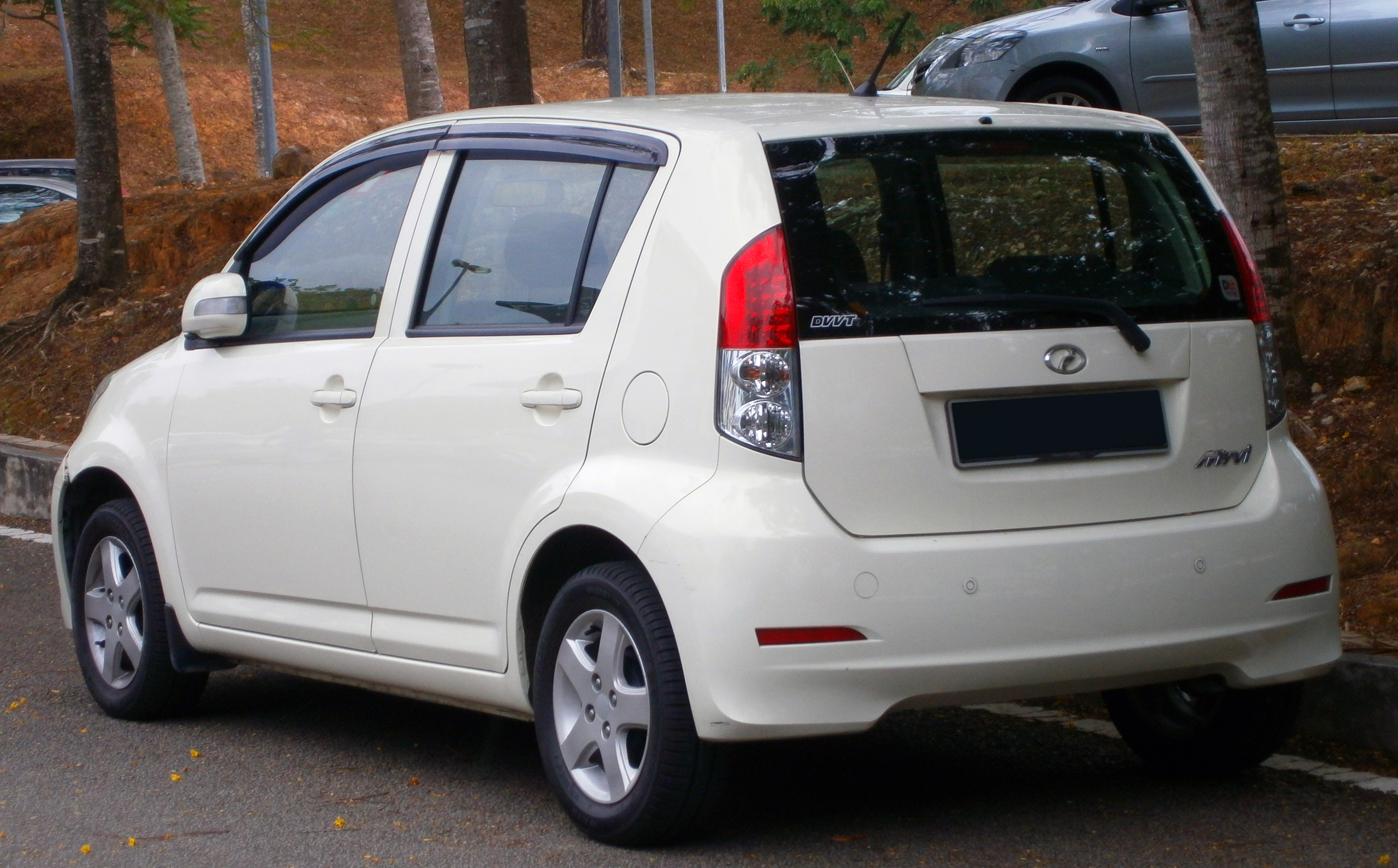
2008–2011 Myvi Standard

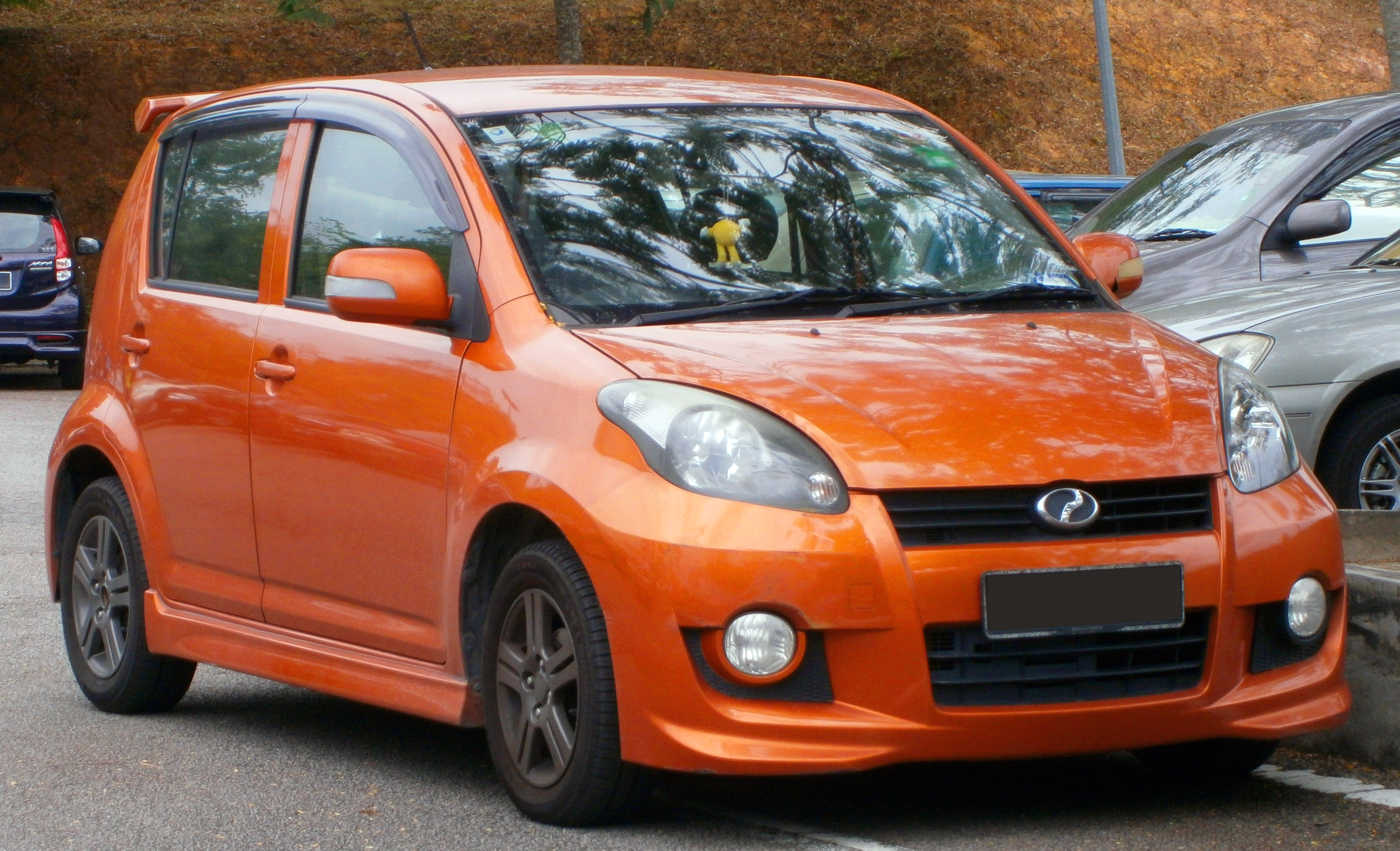
2008–2011 Myvi SE

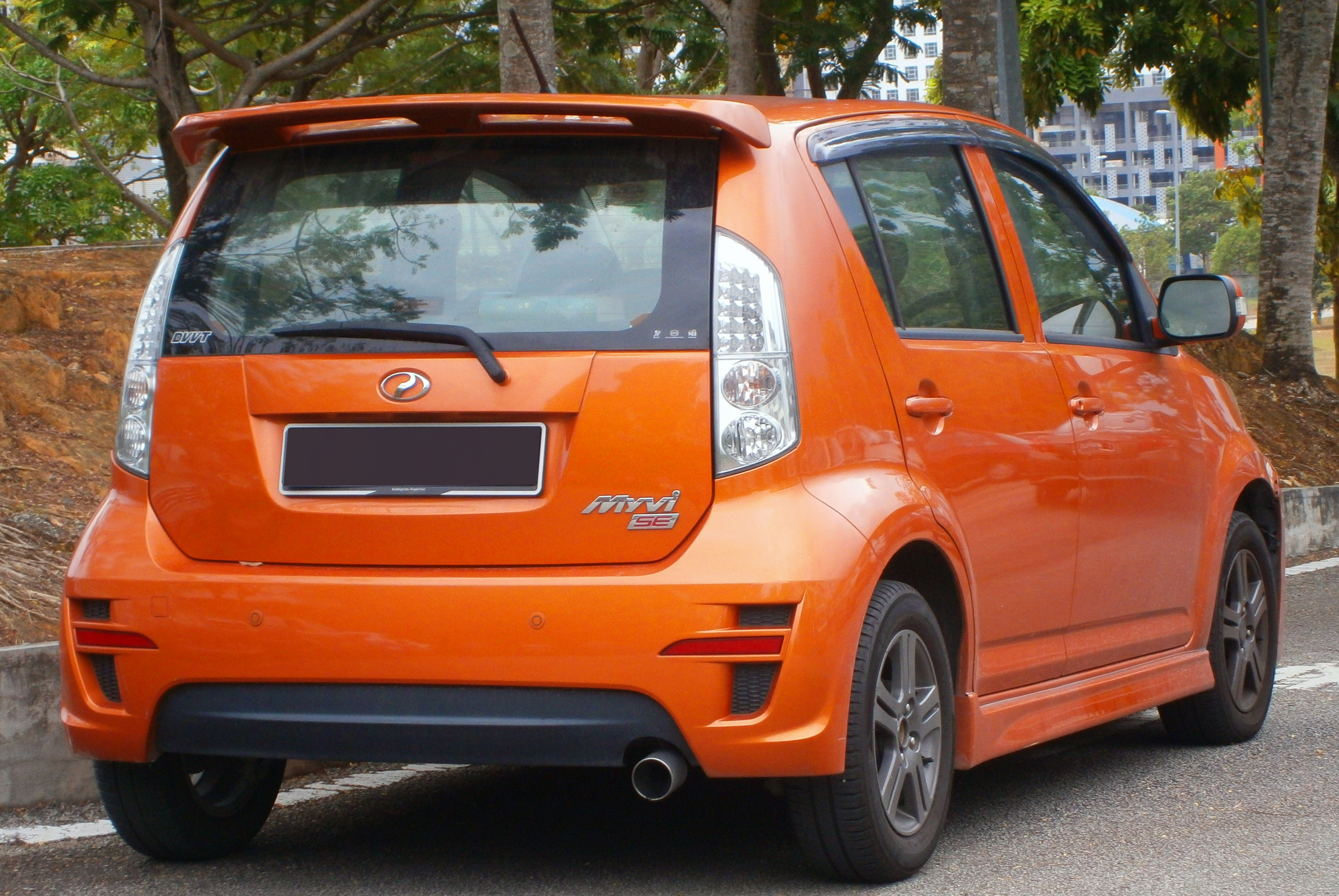
2008–2011 Myvi SE

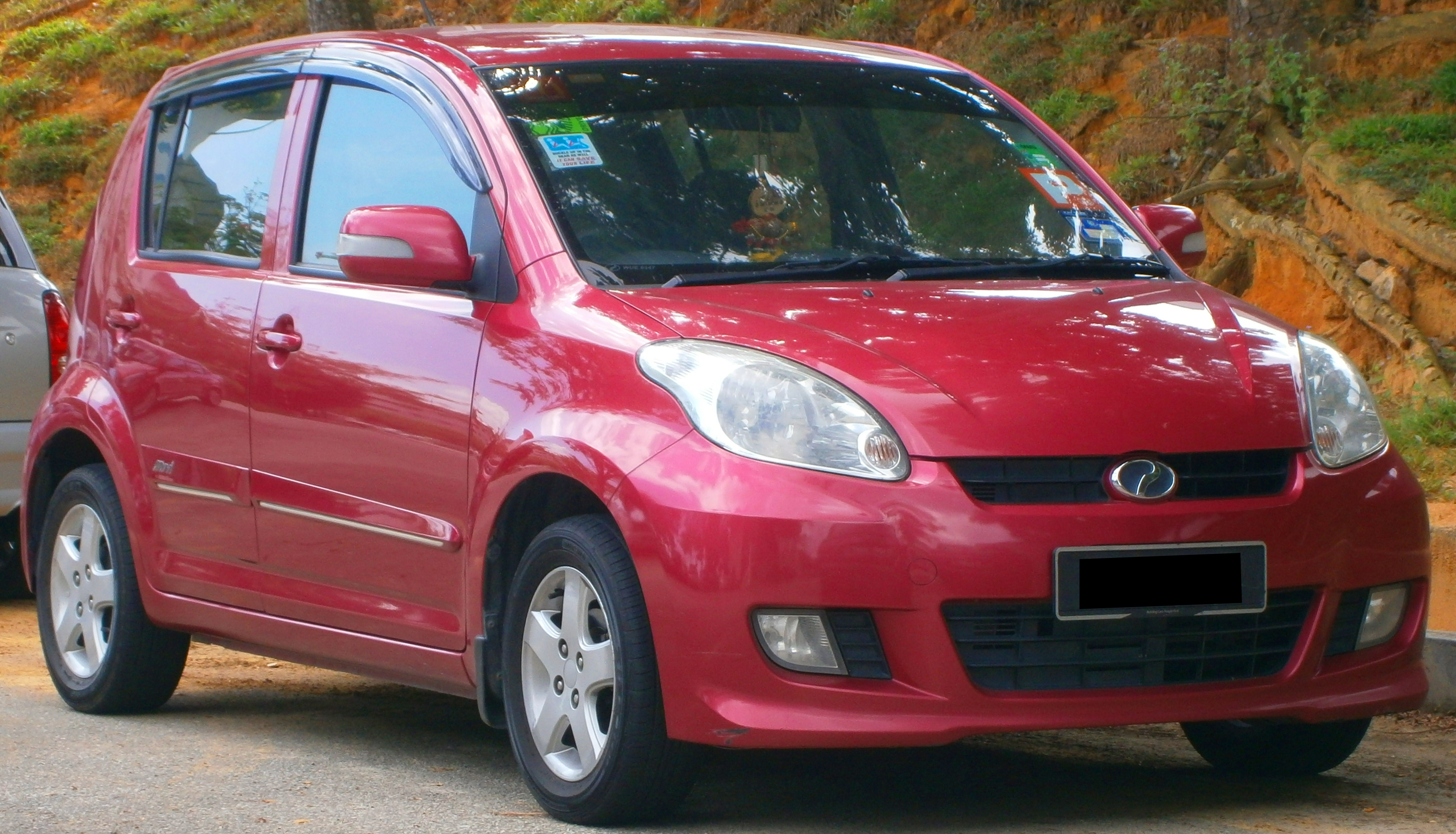
2010–2011 Myvi LE

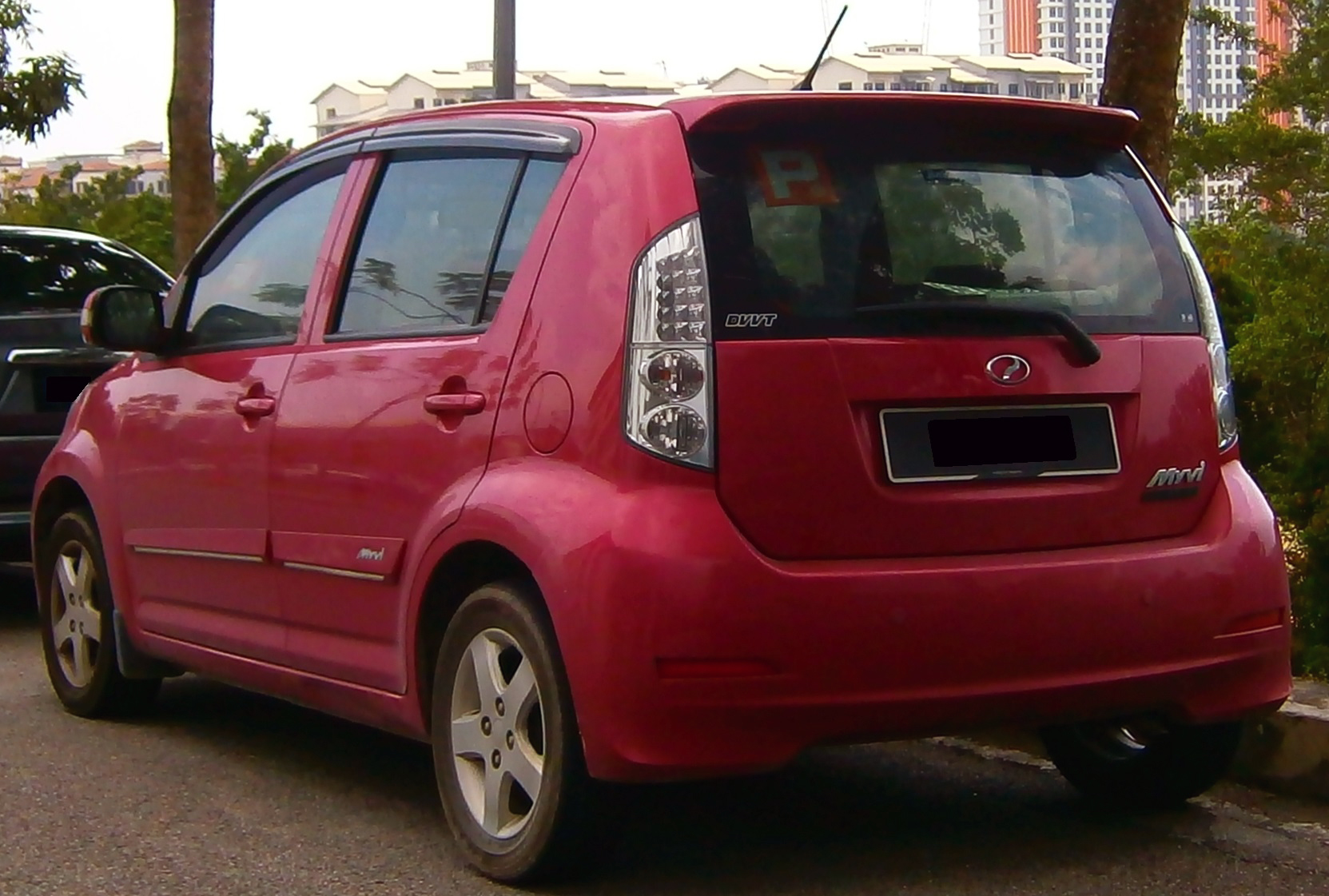
2010–2011 Myvi LE

=== Performance and design ===
The Myvi boasts either one of two water-cooled, four-stroke engines derived from the first generation Daihatsu Sirion: A 1.0-litre EJ-VE I3, or a 1.3-litre K3-VE I4 engine; with both engines employing Dynamic Variable Valve Timing (DVVT) systems and conventional electronic fuel injection (EFI). Perodua's Serendah plant built both engines locally.

In addition to raw performance, features previously uncommon on Perodua cars were inherited from the Sirion to the Myvi. Among them are four-hole injectors, foamed urethane injected to the A-pillar, centre pillar and B-pillar for noise insulation, immobiliser systems and pedestrian safety body construction. Other notable features include underbody air flow regulating items, resin intake manifolds and cylinder headcovers integrated with air cleaner cases and flexible flywheels for reduced vibration during running (manual gearbox only).

=== Engines ===
Petrol engines
Model	Year	Engine	Displacement	Power	Torque	0–100 km/h (0–62 mph)	Top speed	Transmission
EJ-VE	2005–2011	I3	989 cc	43.0 kW; 57.7 hp (58.5 PS) at 6,000 rpm	88 N⋅m (65 lbf⋅ft) at 3,600 rpm	13.5 s	160 km/h (99 mph)	5-speed manual
K3-VE	2005-2011	I4	1298 cc	64.0 kW; 85.8 hp (87.0 PS) at 6,000 rpm	116 N⋅m (86 lbf⋅ft) at 3,200 rpm	10.9 s(Manual) 12.5 s(Automatic)	170 km/h (110 mph)(Manual) 164 km/h (102 mph)(Automatic)	5-speed manual 4-speed automatic

=== Facelift ===
On 22 August 2008, the company launched an updated Perodua Myvi. The new Myvi features a modified grille, front bumper, bonnet, rear bumper, alloy rims, dashboard colour, instrument panel design, MP3/WMA player and seat fabric. The 1.3 Premium trim includes new UV protection glass, a seat height adjuster, and a new audio system with USB and Bluetooth capabilities.

A "Special Edition" of the new Perodua Myvi SE was also launched on 10 October 2008, with new bumpers, clear taillights, smoked headlights, an amber instrument panel, leather seats, and a 2-DIN CD player with MP3, WMA, USB and Bluetooth support instead of an integrated unit. It is only available with a 1.3L engine with a manual or automatic gearbox.

An "Exclusive Edition" of the Perodua Myvi also launched in October 2009. It is very similar to the SE variant, albeit only the side skirts remain, as the front and rear bumpers retain the same design as the standard Myvis. Only three colours are available – Ebony Black, Ivory White and Medallion Grey, priced at RM51,000 for a solid finish and an extra RM500 for a metallic finish.

A "Limited Edition" of the Perodua Myvi also launched in July 2010, based on the standard 1.3 automatic variants. It had a unique colour called Dazzling Red. The LE has new trim colour, fabric and interior door handles, an "LE" carpet mat, and decorative cubic printing on both the centre cluster and the door trim armrests. There are also dual airbags for the people at the front. The radio has USB and Bluetooth connectivity. On the outside, Perodua has fitted the Myvi LE with smoked clear rear combination lamps (straight from the Myvi SE), "LE" badging and side door mouldings.

=== Reception ===
The launch of the Perodua Myvi was significant as it marked the first time Perodua competed head-to-head with Proton, the first Malaysian national carmaker, which would release a similarly classed Proton Savvy.

The Myvi 1.3 beat its rival, the Proton Savvy 1.2, as the "Car of the Year 2005/2006" by Autocar ASEAN, a magazine for car buyers in Malaysia. The Edge Daily, a local financial news media, reported that Myvi sales have far surpassed its initial expectations and has been selling exceptionally well since its rollout in April.

Proton's Savvy, available to the market a few months after the launch of the Myvi, had not affected Myvi sales. Observing the strong demand for the Myvi, it boosted sales of vehicles in the country and Perodua's market share in 2006.

=== Reviews ===
Richard Hammond, a presenter on BBC's Top Gear, gave a positive review of the Perodua Myvi, saying:

"No jokes, this is a good-looking car. But if it looks familiar, that's because this is a Daihatsu Sirion in all but name. You see it costs billions to develop a new car – you design them on computers then build lots of them to crash into walls. So Perodua let someone else do it and spent their money sticking a new badge on it.

But they kept a bit back to spend on styling. Which is why, even though it shares bits and pieces with the Sirion, the Myvi is better looking...

...So under seven grand for a good-looking car, built in a factory shared with Toyota, which handles as well as a Yaris, does nearly 50mpg with a three-year warranty – yes please."

Jeremy Clarkson's review was less positive, claiming the brakes, the ride, the seats and the interior were "rubbish". He also humorously suggested that "this is a car you drive with a long face".

A 2009 study by J.D. Power & Associates saw the Myvi ranked highest for its initial quality concerning new-vehicle ownership in the compact car segment.

=== Export ===
The first generation Perodua Myvi was exported to Indonesia and rebadged as the Daihatsu Sirion since April 2007. The Sirion in Indonesia does not use the global Sirion styling by Daihatsu but uses Perodua's styling, including the interior, bumpers and lamps. It is only available in the 1.3L version with two trim levels. The D trim offers basic specification, while the M trim offers Aerokits and leather seats. PT Astra Daihatsu Motor sold 1,030 units of the Sirion in 2010, followed by 2,857 in 2011.

Perodua also exported this particular Myvi to the United Kingdom and was the company's last vehicle to be sold there until the brand was exited from the UK market in 2013.

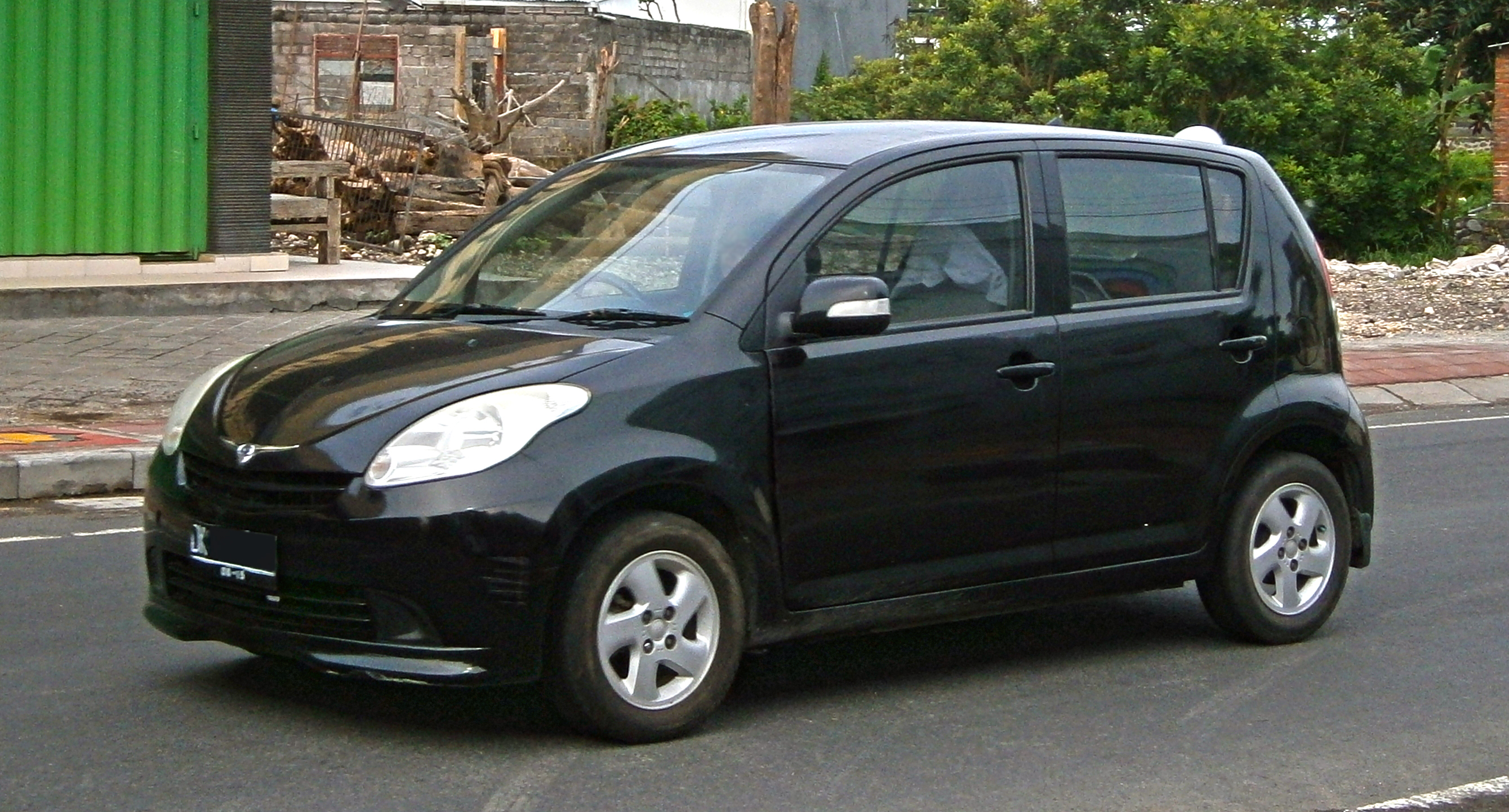
2007–2008 Daihatsu Sirion in Indonesia

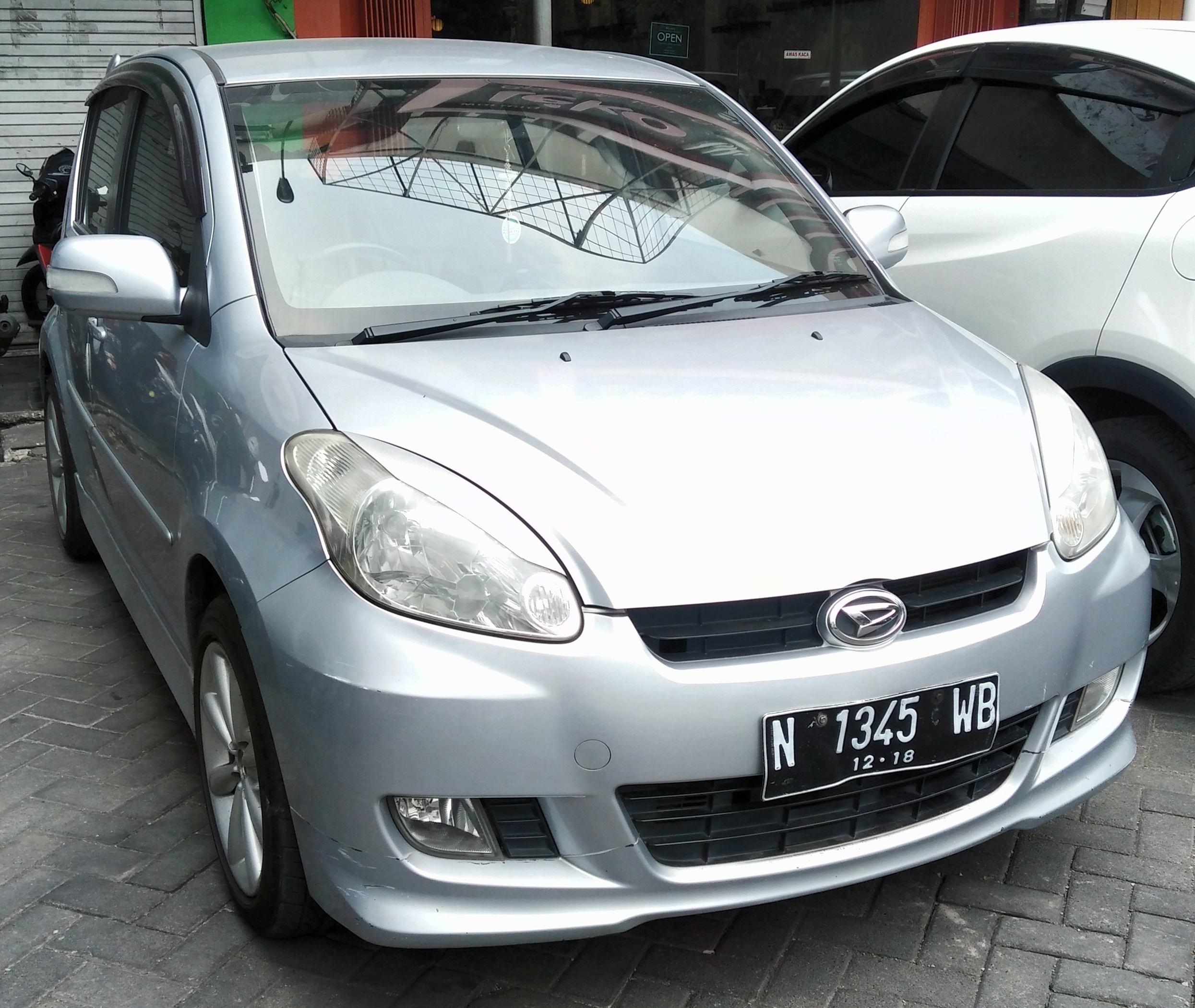
2008–2011 Daihatsu Sirion in Indonesia

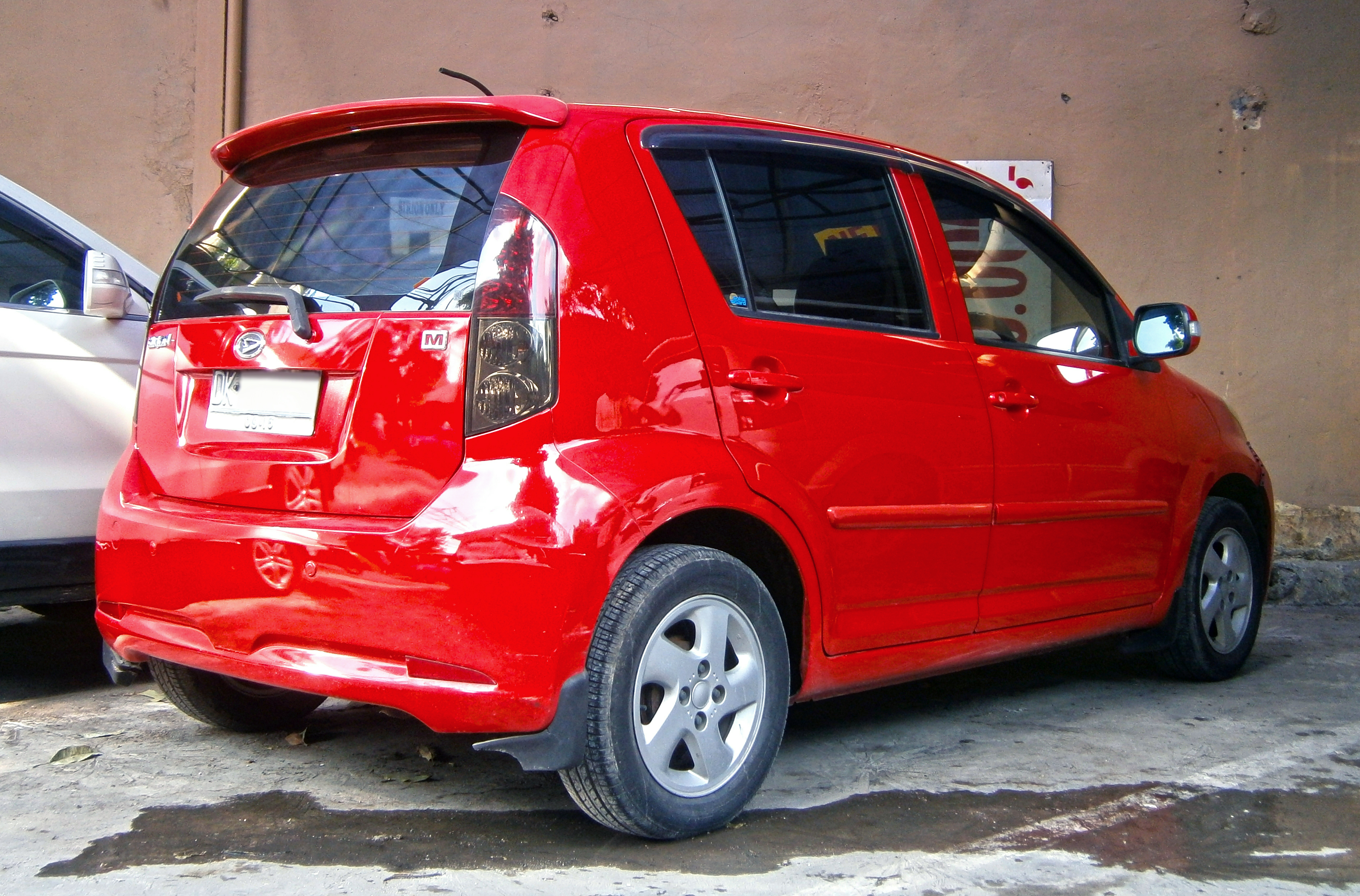
2008–2011 Daihatsu Sirion in Indonesia

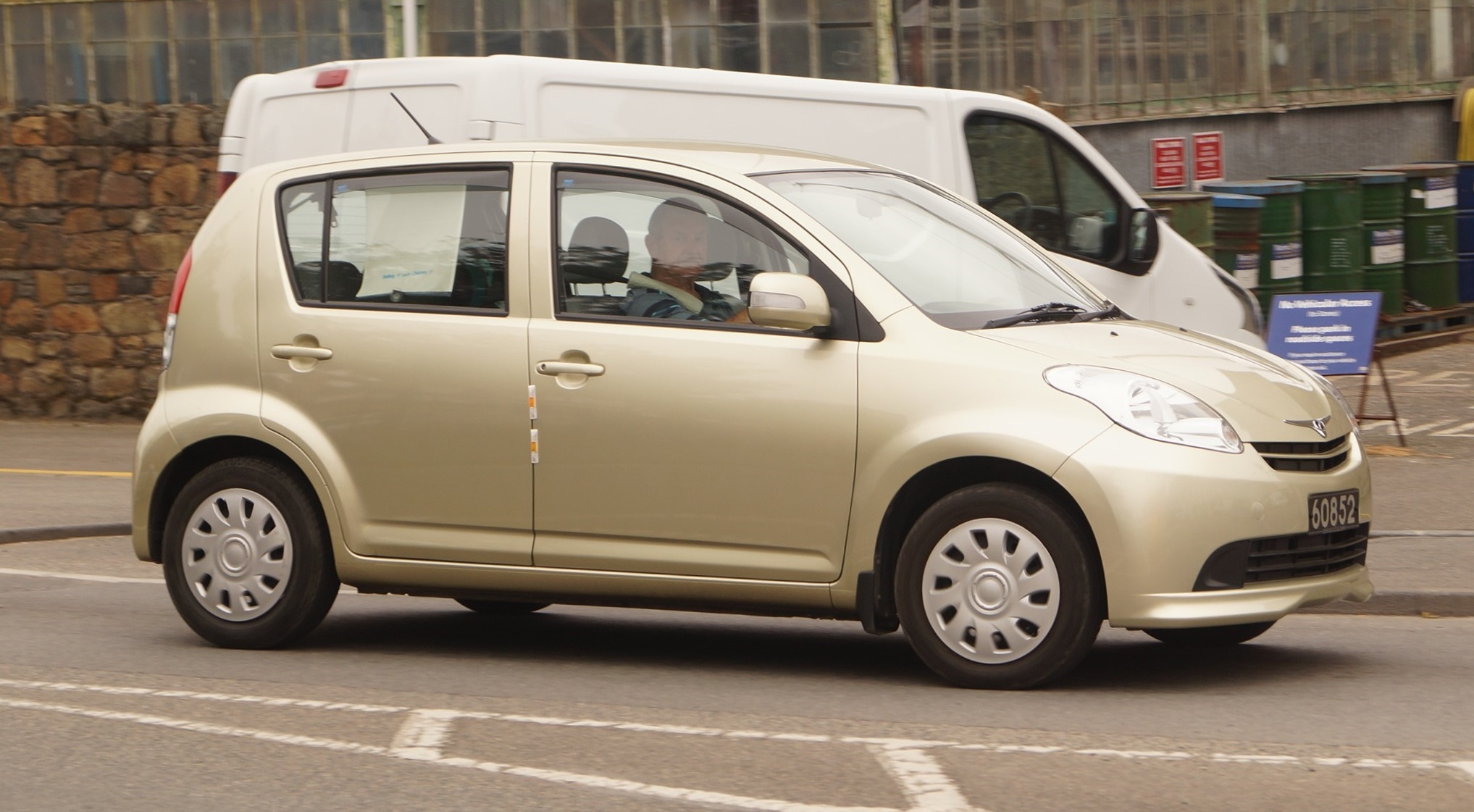
2005-2011 Perodua Myvi in Guernsey

== Second generation (M600; 2011) ==
Second generation
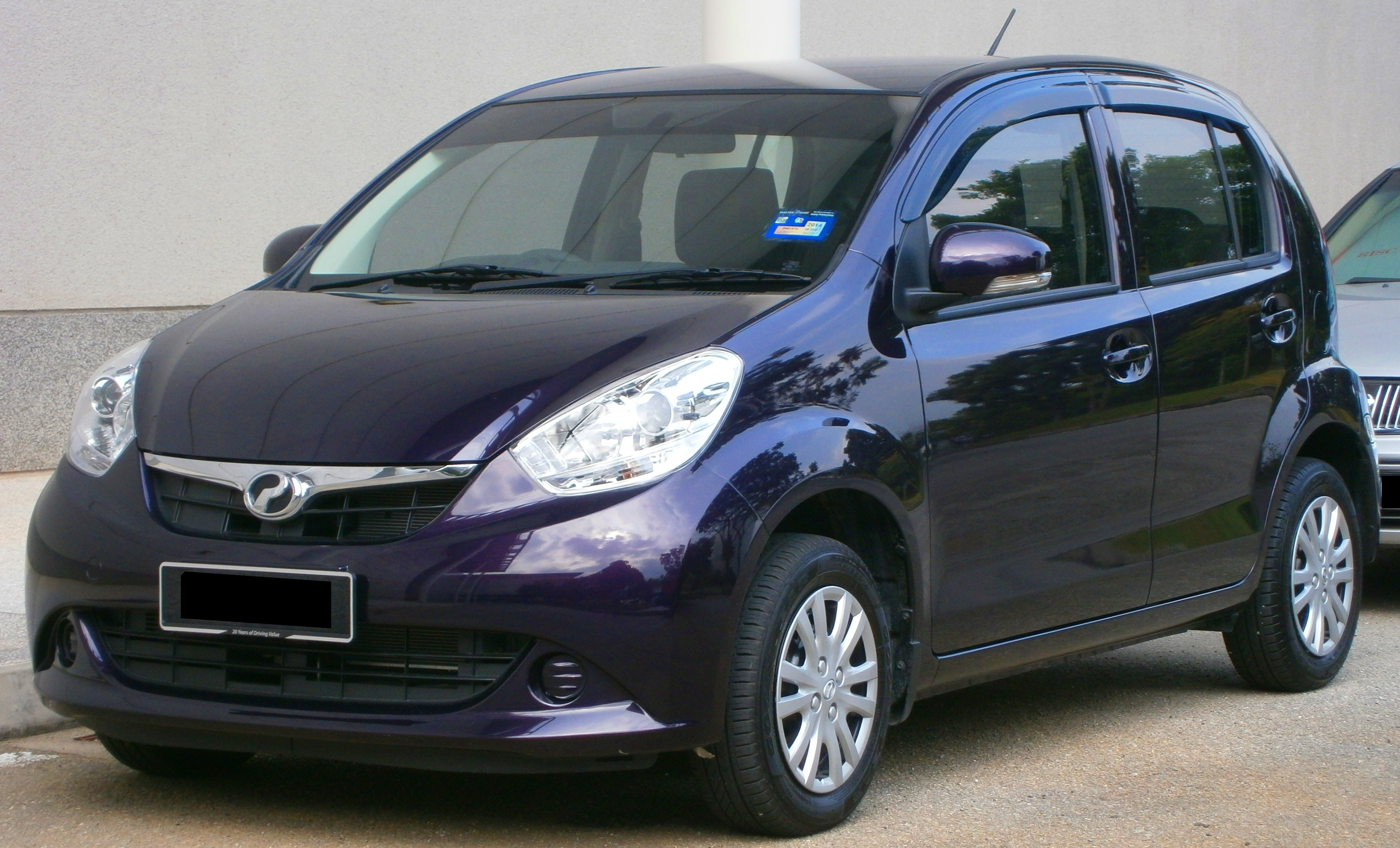

Overview
- Model code: M600
- Also called: Daihatsu Boon/Sirion (Japan/international); Daihatsu Sirion (Indonesia, July 2011 – February 2018)
- Production: June 2011 – November 2017

Powertrain
- Engine: 1.3 L K3-VE I4 (petrol); 1.5 L 3SZ-VE I4 (petrol)
- Transmission: 5-speed manual; 4-speed automatic

Dimensions
- Wheelbase: 2,440 mm (96.1 in)
- Length: 3,685–3,695 mm (145.1–145.5 in)
- Width: 1,665 mm (65.6 in)
- Height: 1,545 mm (60.8 in)
- Kerb weight: 950–990 kg (2,094–2,183 lb)

=== 2011–2014 ===
Developed under D54T project, the 2011 Myvi was launched on 16 June 2011 with a tagline of Lagi Best (contextually, Lagi means more in Malay) for 1.3 version and later for 1.5 version with tagline hidup myvi.

In April 2014, Perodua launched base Myvi XT model which replace the 1.3 standard. It added equipment at no extra cost.

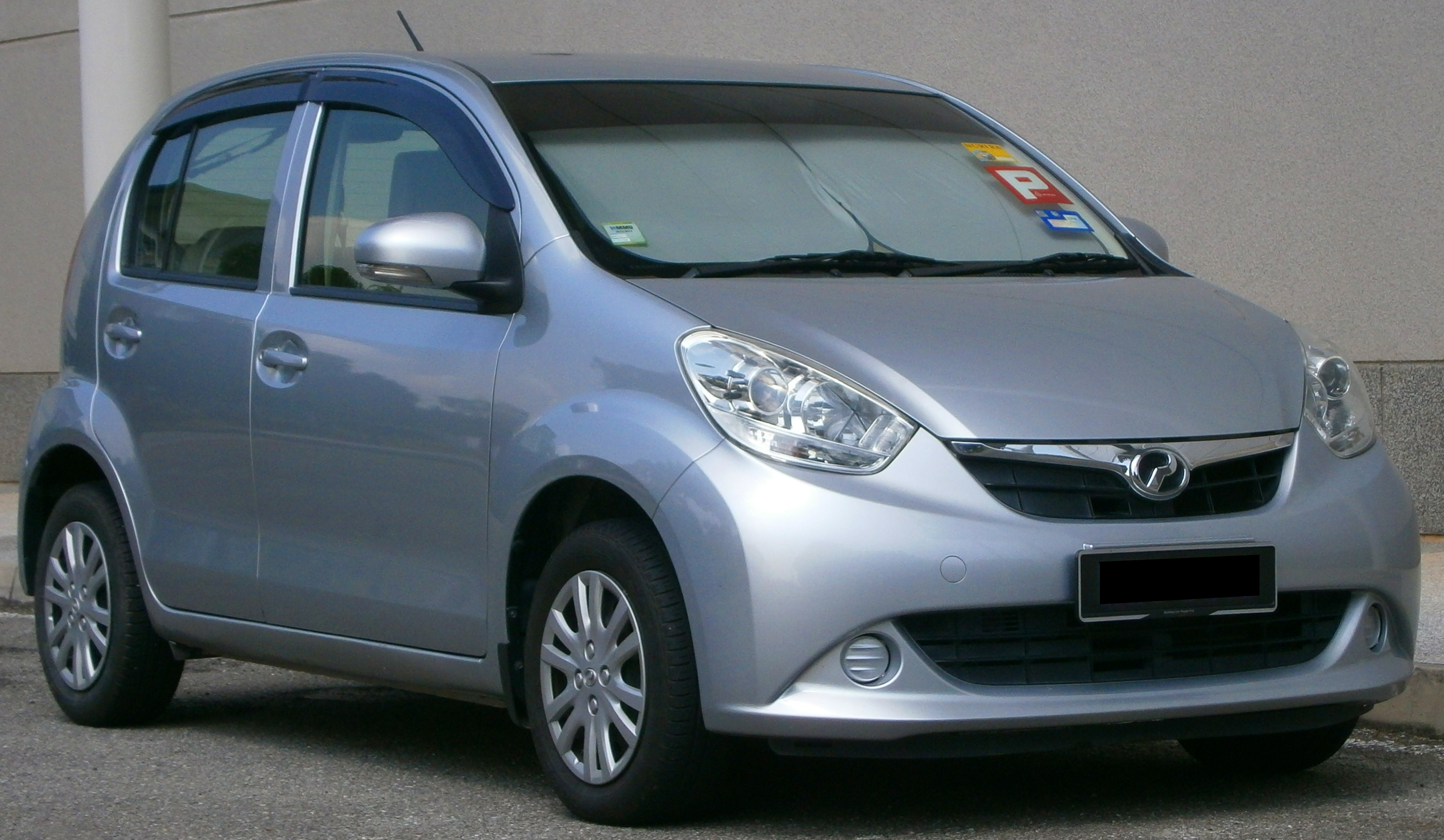
2011–2014 Myvi Standard

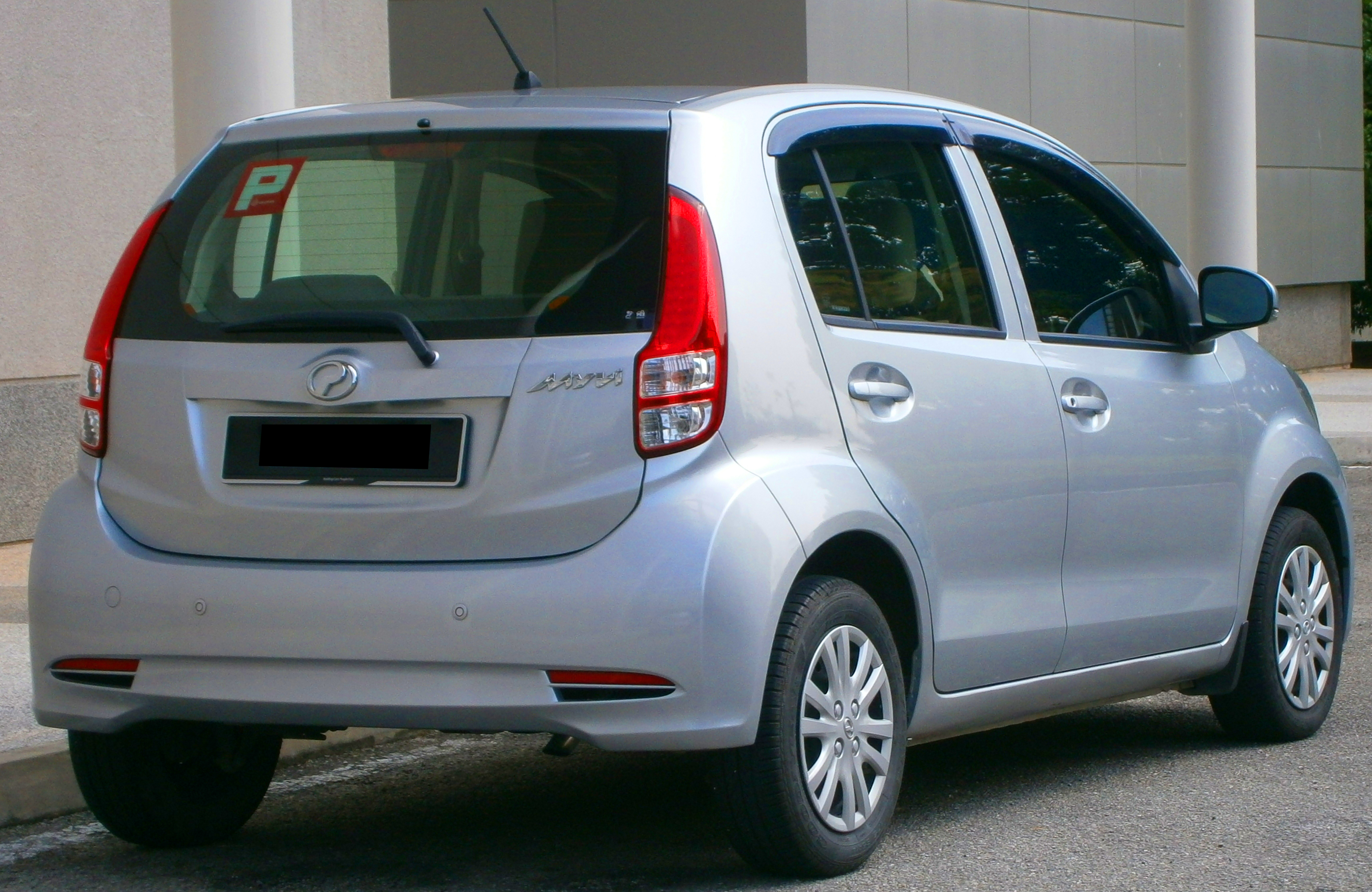
2011–2014 Myvi Standard

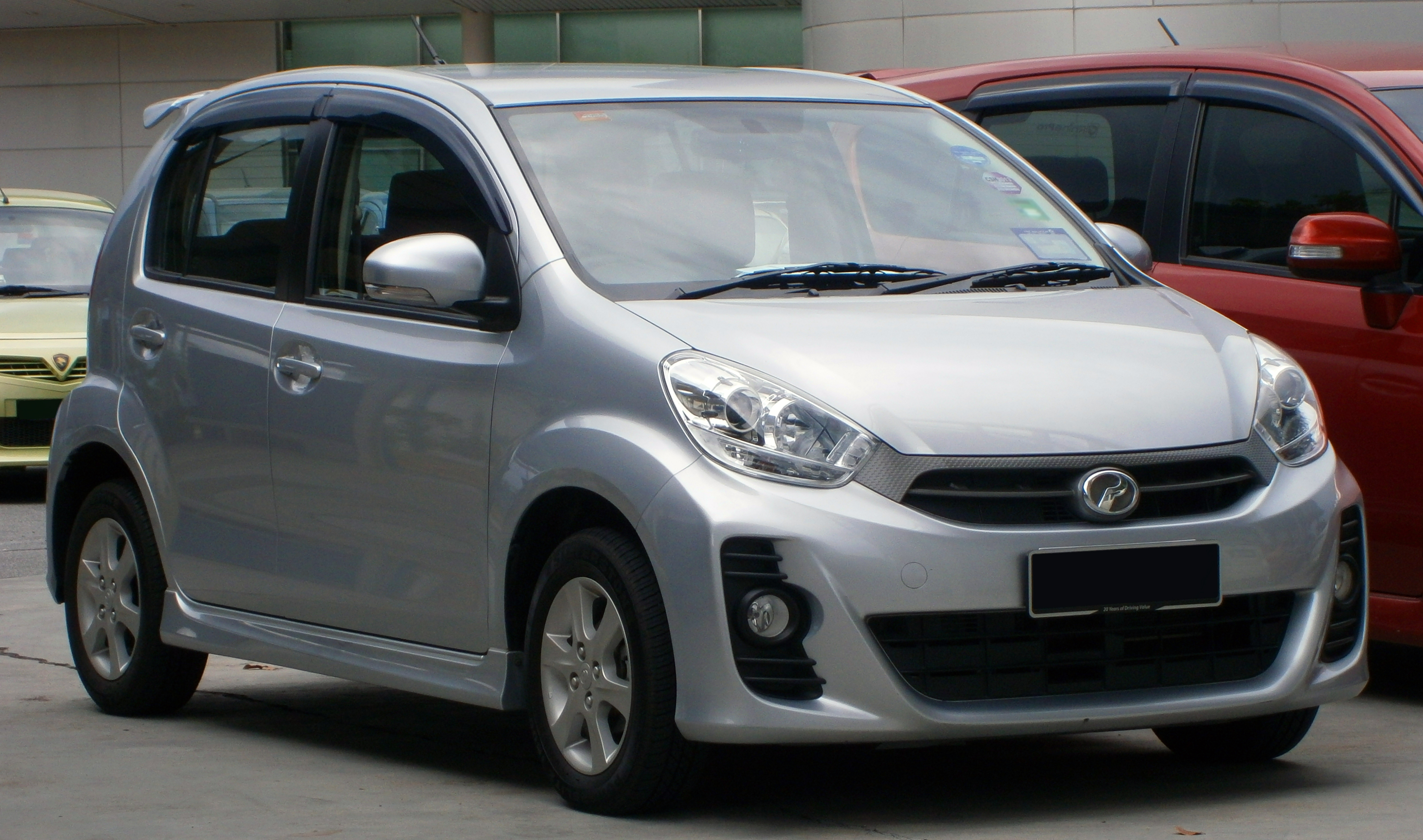
2013–2014 Myvi 1.3 SE

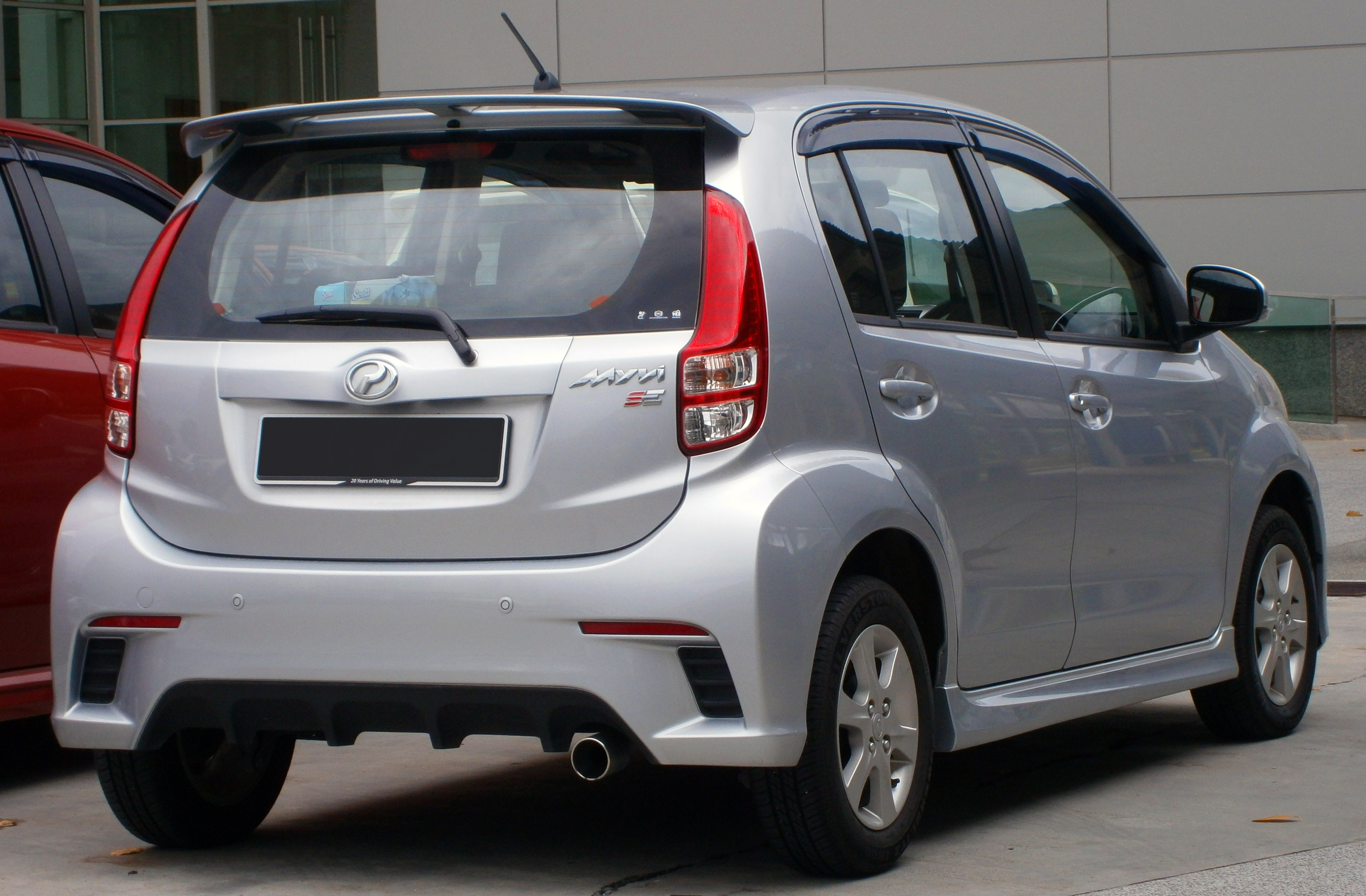
2013–2014 Myvi 1.3 SE

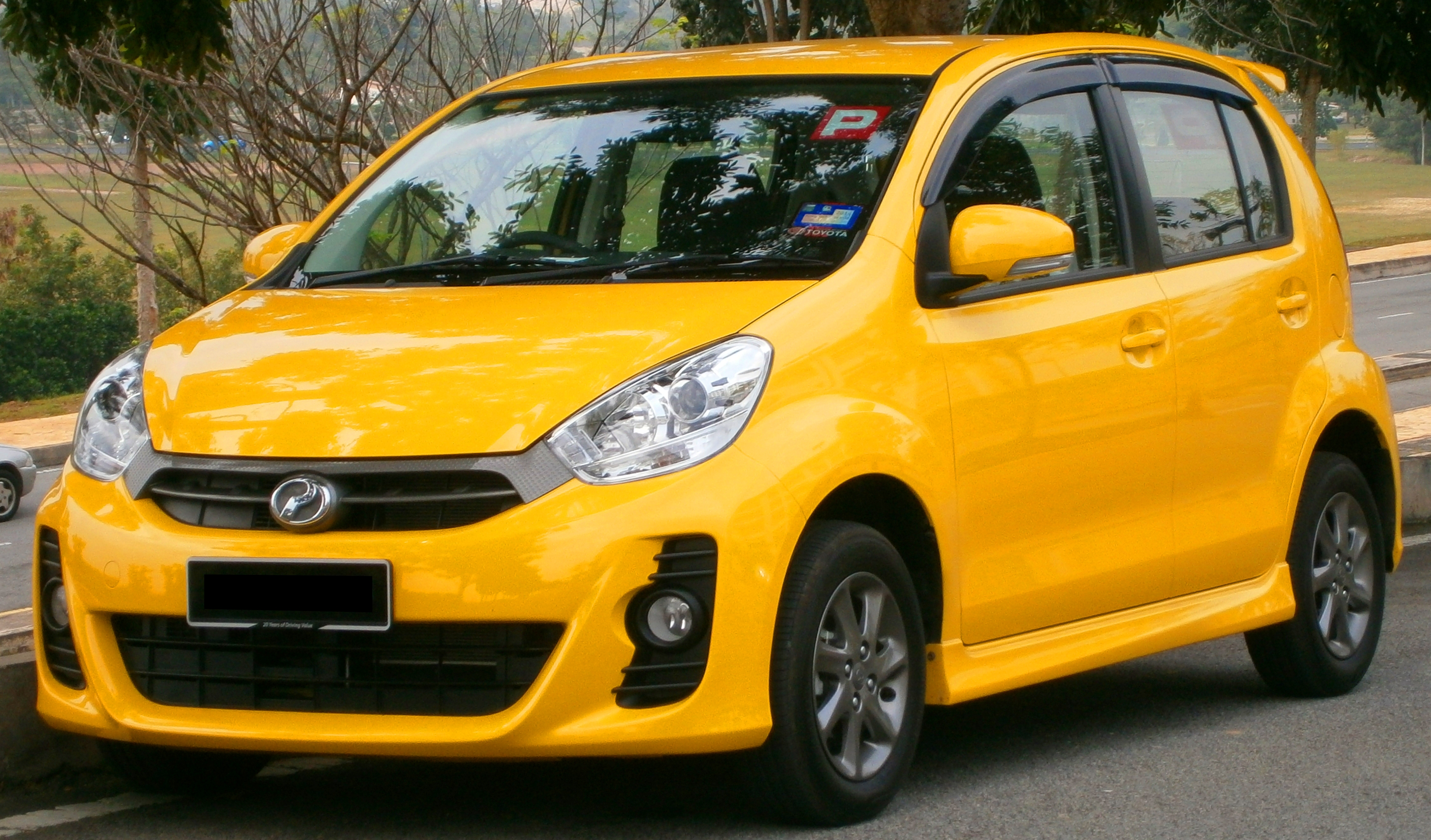
2011–2014 Myvi 1.5 SE

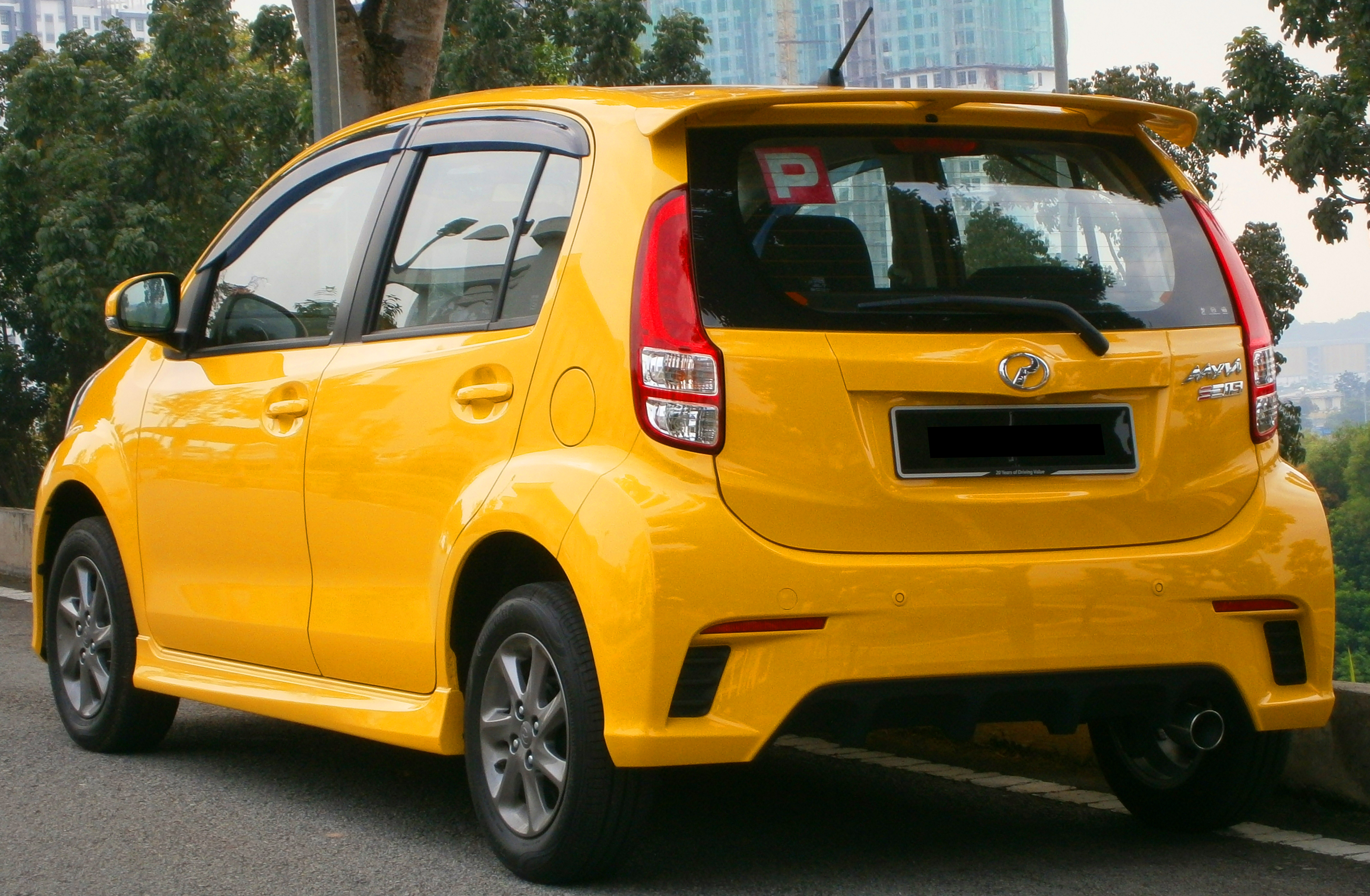
2011–2014 Myvi 1.5 SE

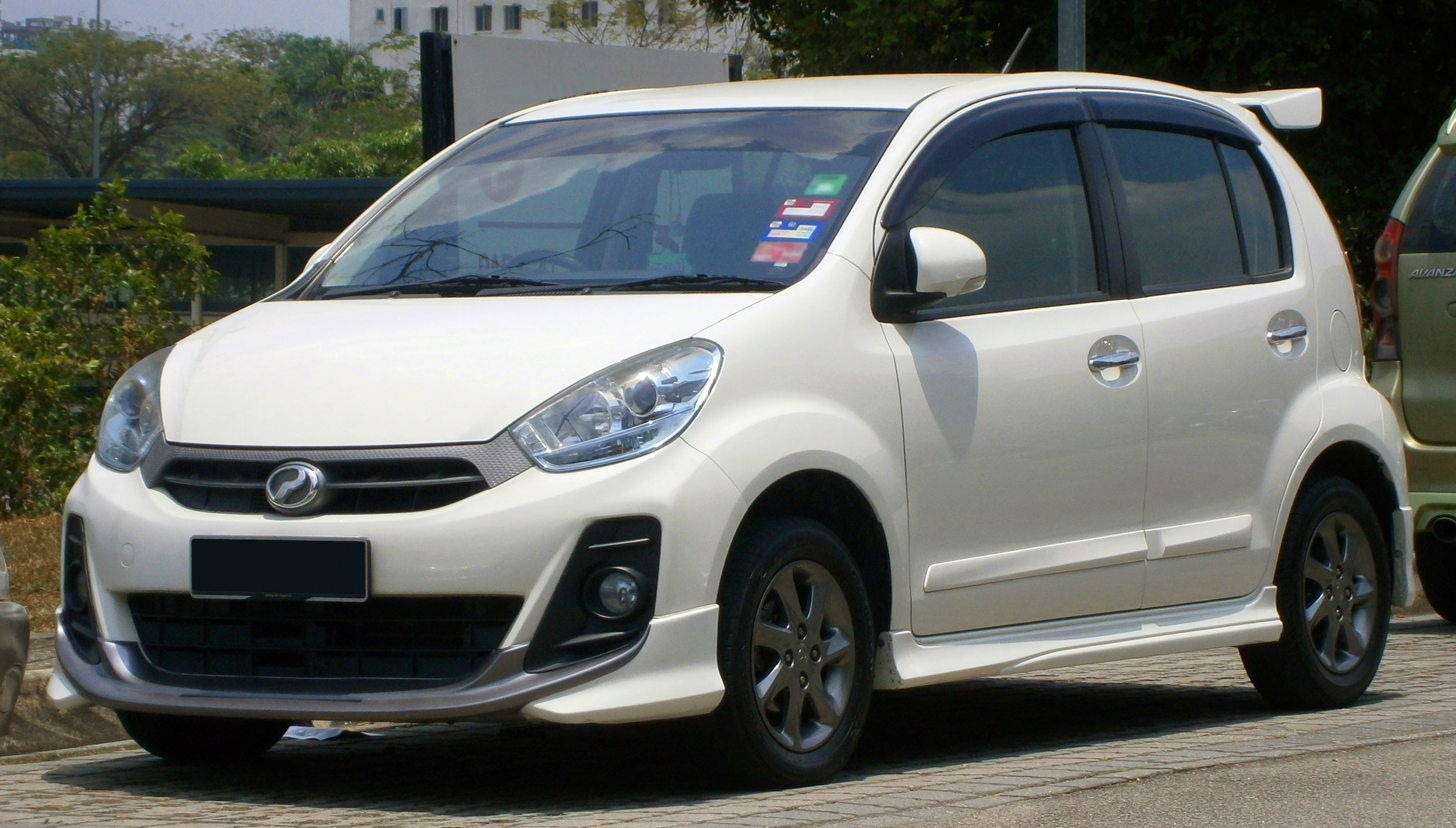
2011–2014 Myvi 1.5 Extreme

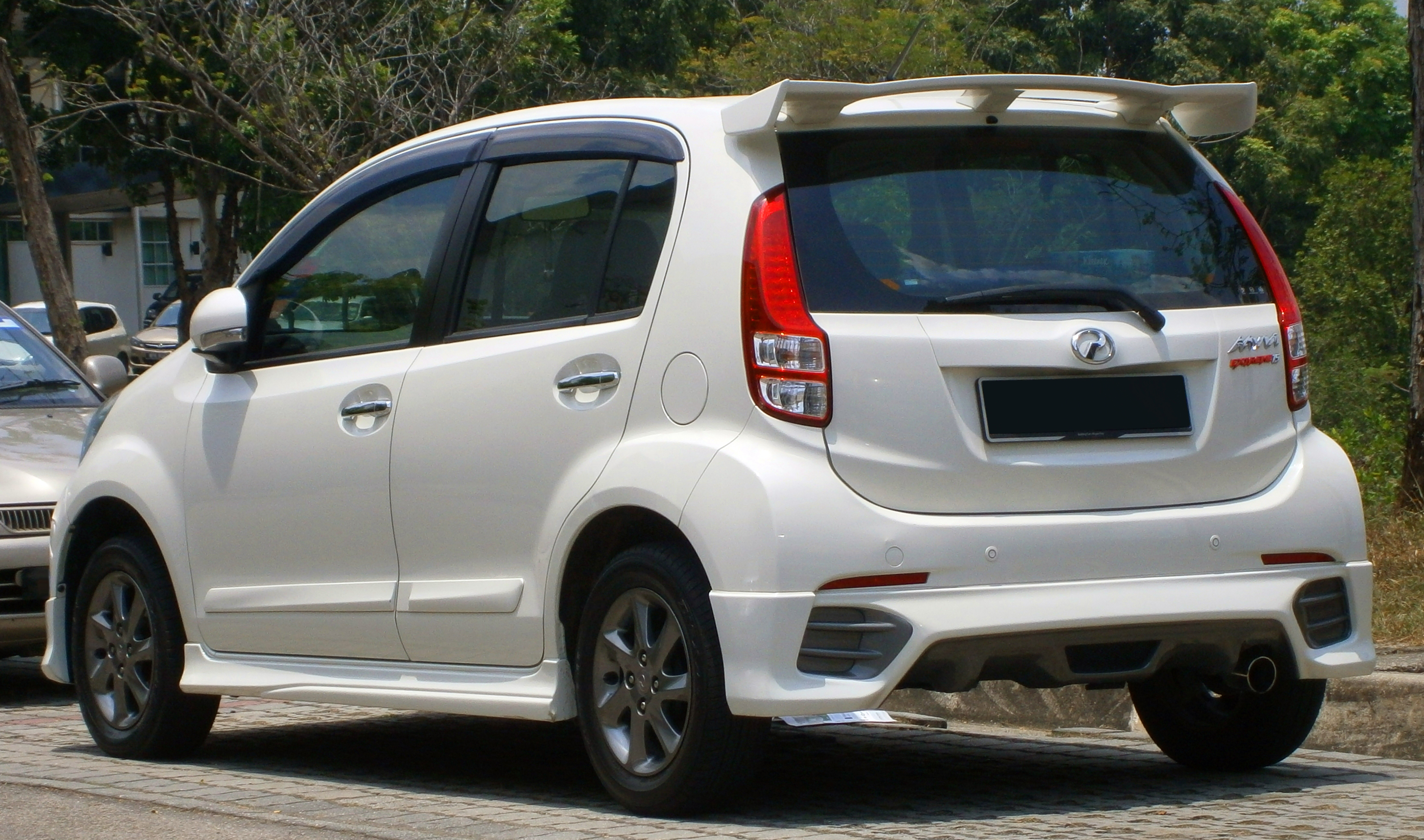
2011–2014 Myvi 1.5 Extreme

==== Performance and safety ====
Both 1.3-litre K3-VE and 1.5-litre 3SZ-VE engines are fitted with DVVT and EFI. Despite the fact that the 1.3-litre is a carry-over from the previous generation Myvi, Perodua reported an increase of 10 hp for the new model. The increase was attributed to the new electric power steering (EPS) system. Additionally, the 1.5-litre 3SZ-VE engine, which also powers the Alza, is imported from the Daihatsu engine plant in Karawang, Indonesia.

Dual SRS Airbags are standard across the range, the first of the national badged cars in Malaysia. The central rear seat belt is a 3-point ELR system, an upgrade over the 2-point belt in the previous generation. ISOFIX is standard across the range for standard installations of child seats. ABS and EBD is available in the 1.3L Premium, 1.3L Elegance and all 1.5L variants.

==== Equipment ====
The 2011 Perodua Myvi is available with two engine options of 1.3L and 1.5L, it was separated by different design of bumper and grille. Both are available in a 4-speed automatic or a 5-speed manual gearbox. There are three trims for the 1.3L model – Standard (EZ & SX), Premium (EZI & SXI) and Elegance, and two trims for the 1.5L model – SE (Special Edition) and Extreme. Although the 2011 Myvi is a rebadged 2010 JDM Daihatsu Boon, it has different exterior and interior styling, equipment and engine. Also the CVT is not available, in contrast with the original model.

Projector headlamp, Electronic Power Steering and dual airbags are standard across the range. The standard trim gets steel rims with caps, and other variants get alloy rims and foglamps. The automatic transmission lever is now relocated to the dashboard area like the Alza. An integrated 2-DIN 6-inch touchscreen DVD Navigation system with Maps powered by Telekom Malaysia is available in the 1.3L Elegance and all 1.5L variants. The 1.3L Elegance and 1.5L Extreme trim levels also get chrome door handles and a different body kit.

==== Safety ====
ASEAN NCAP test results Perodua Myvi (2012)
Test	Points	Stars
Adult occupant:	8.71	3 /5 stars
Child occupant:	54%	0 /5 stars
Safety assist:	NA	

=== 2015–2017 ===
On 7 January 2015, Perodua announced that bookings for the 2015 Perodua Myvi have been opened. The 2015 Myvi is the mid-life facelift model of the second generation Myvi. It has been revamped to suit Perodua's new design language and product branding. The facelifted second generation Perodua Myvi was launched on 15 January 2015.

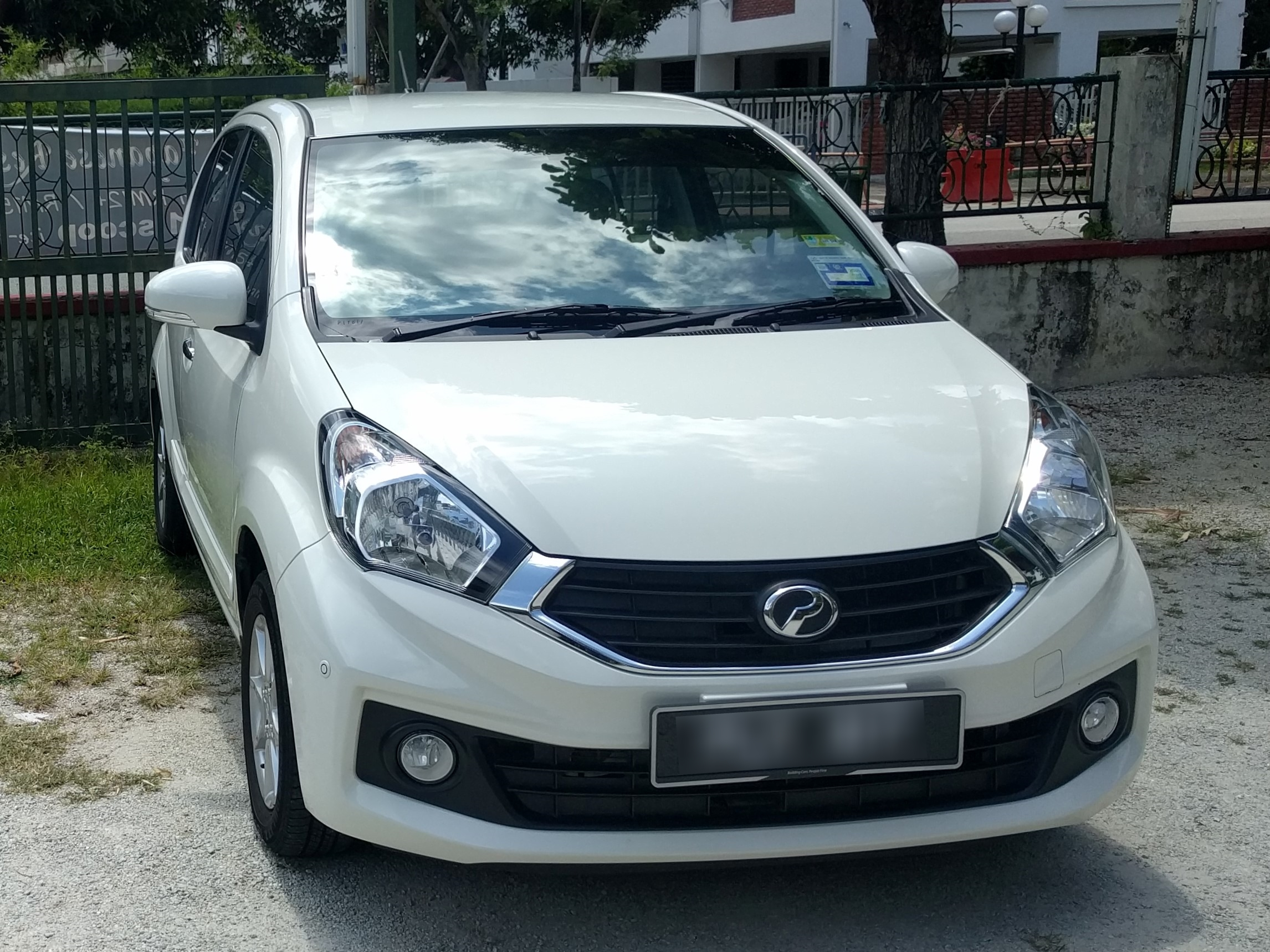
Perodua Myvi 1.3 Premium X (facelift)

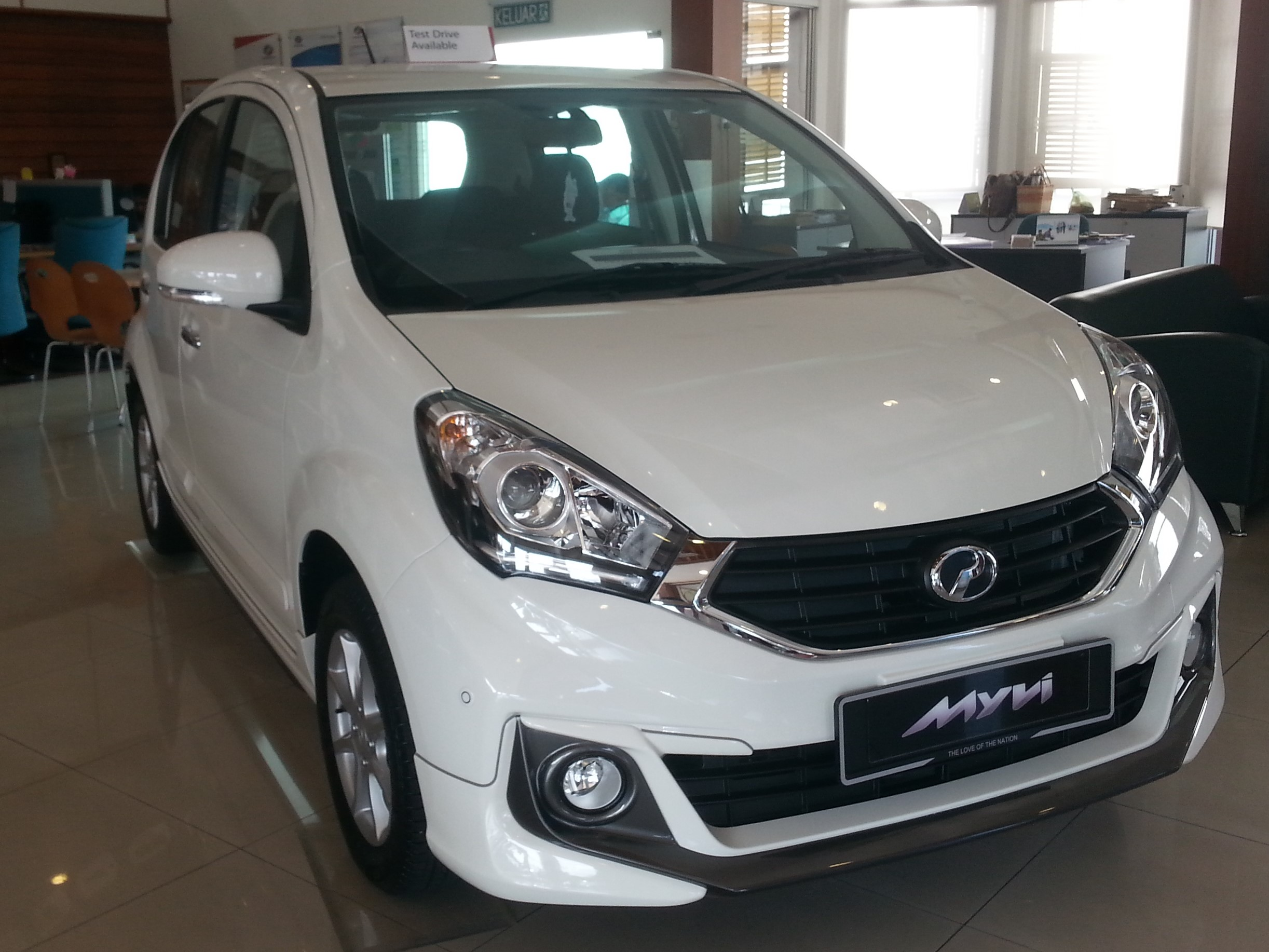
2015 Perodua Myvi 1.3 Premium XS (facelift)

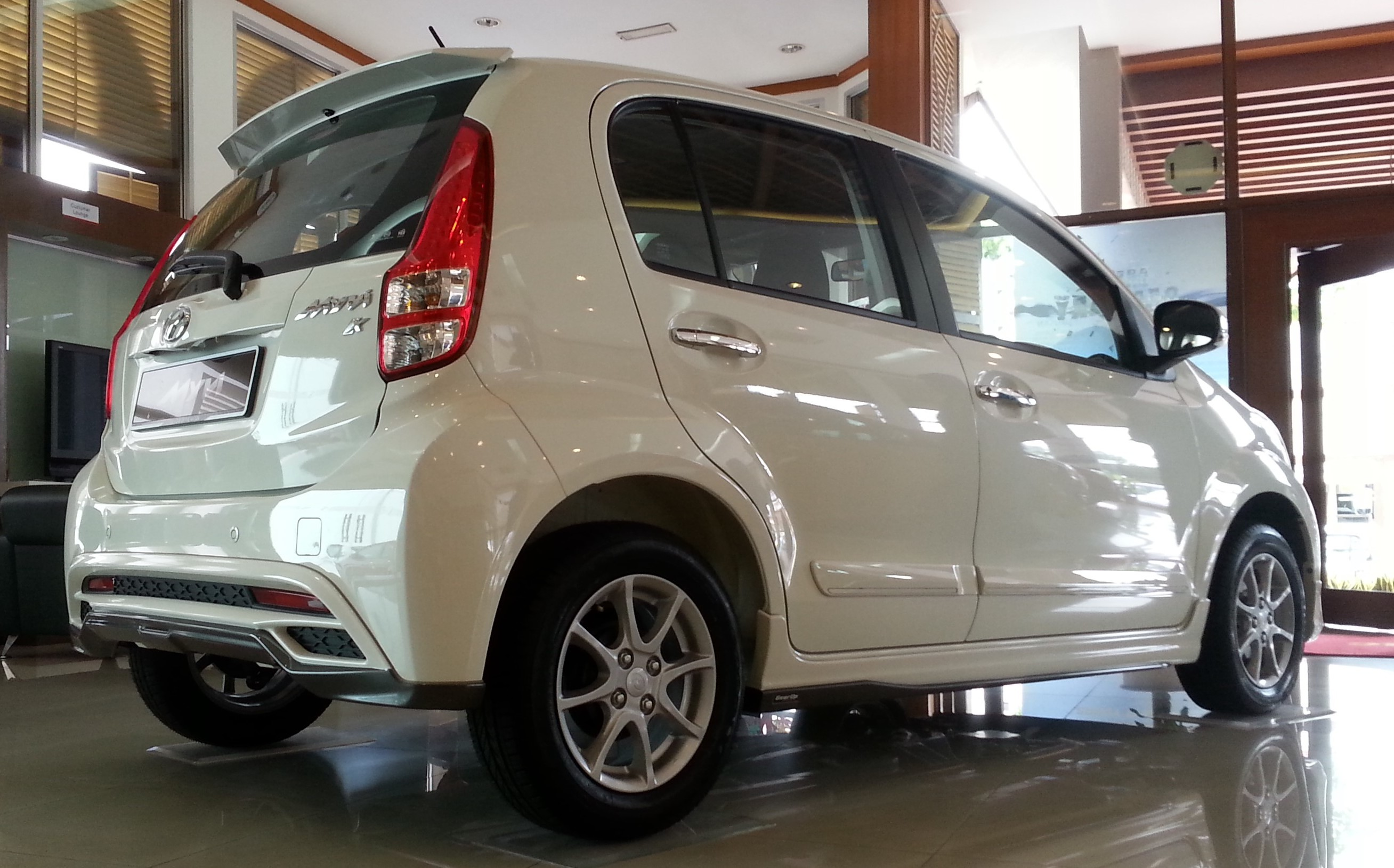
2015 Perodua Myvi 1.3 Premium XS (facelift)

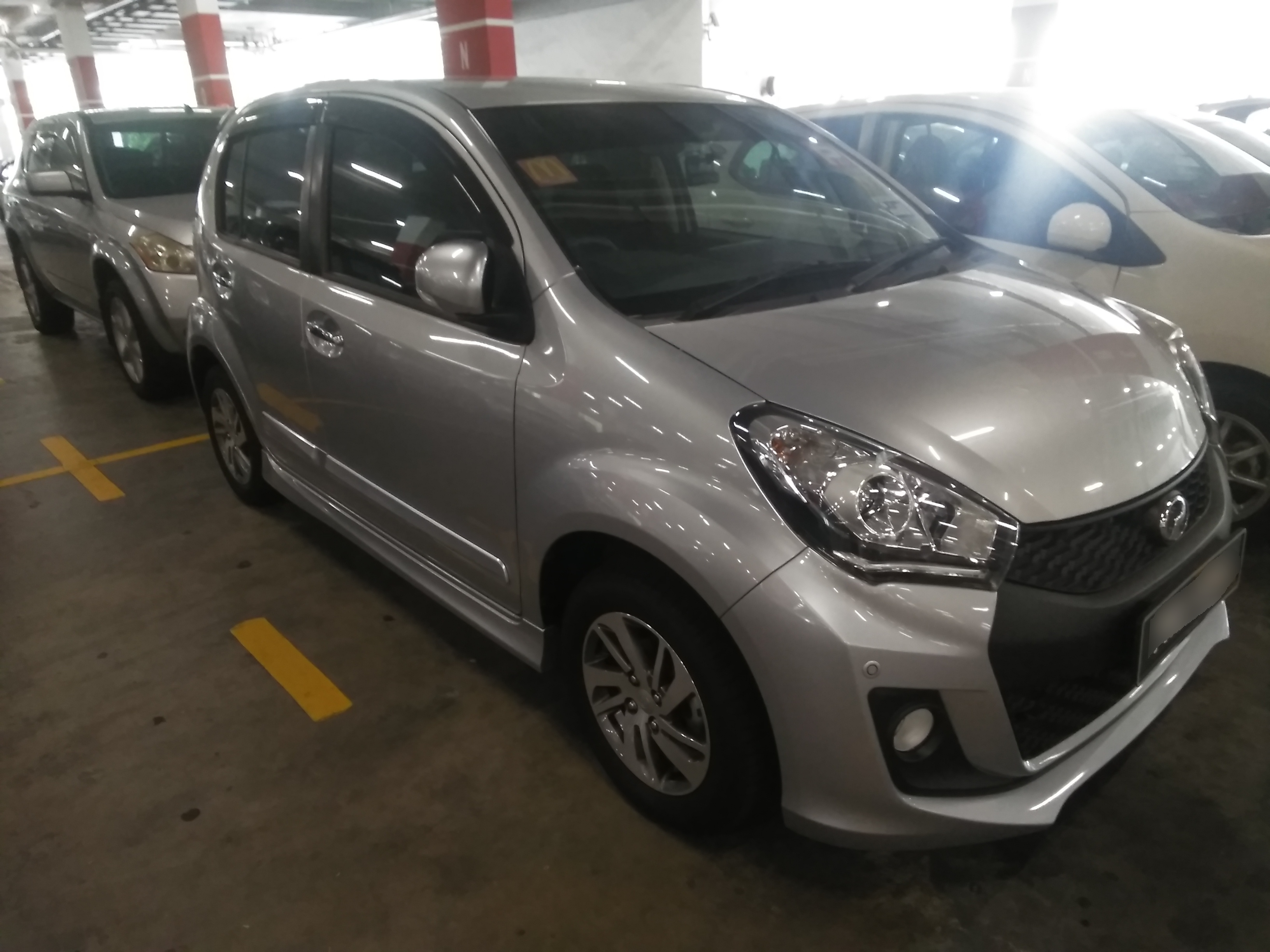
Perodua Myvi 1.5 SE (facelift)

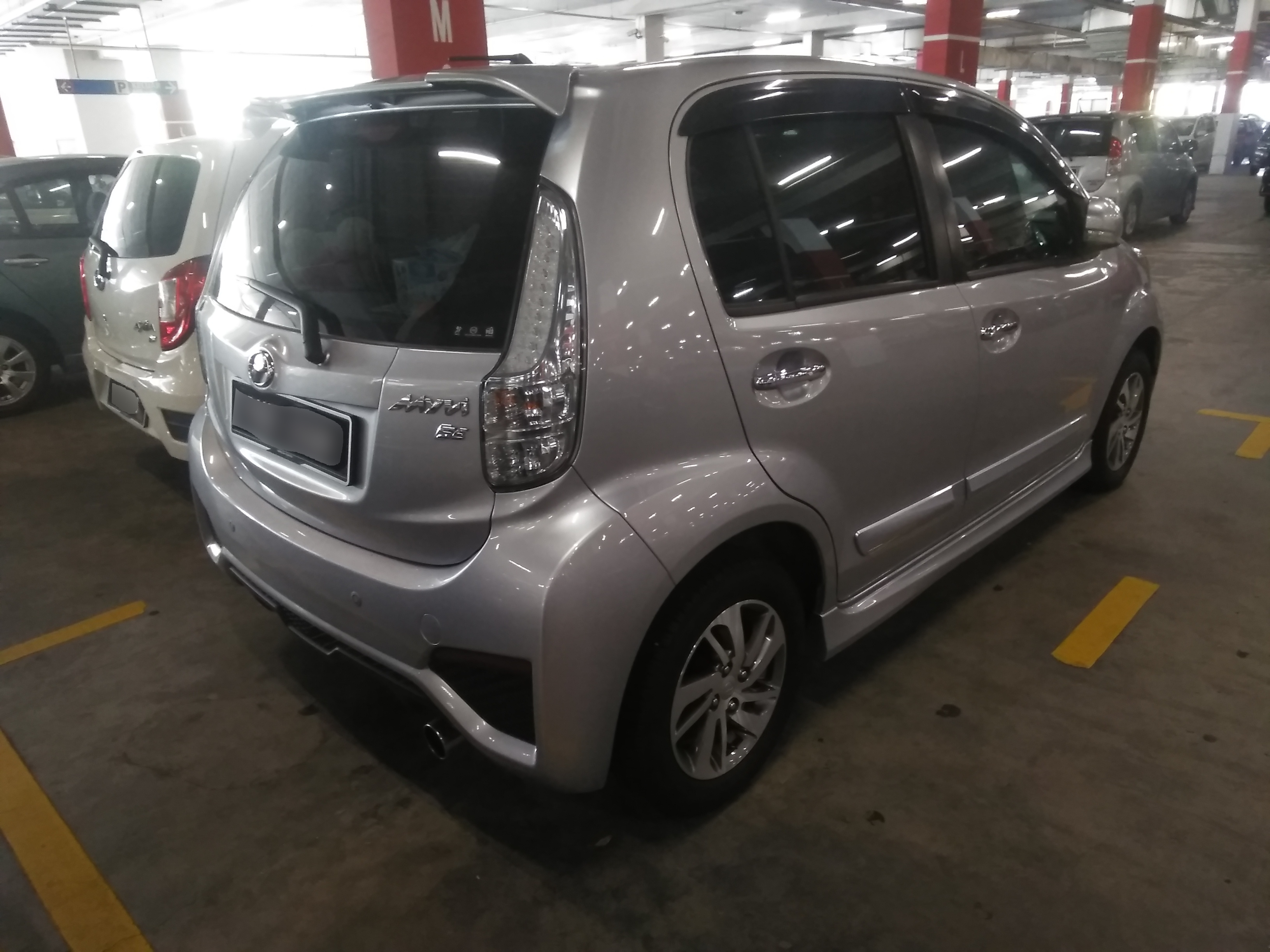
Perodua Myvi 1.5 SE (facelift)

==== Performance ====
The 2015 Myvi was produced in six trim levels, in two engine and transmission options, namely the 1.3L Standard G manual and automatic, 1.3L Premium X automatic, 1.5L SE manual and automatic and 1.5L Advance automatic. The powertrain remains largely unchanged over the pre-facelift Myvi, with the four-cylinder 1.3L K3-VE and 1.5L 3SZ-VE engines developing 90 hp with 117 Nm, and 102 hp with 136 Nm respectively. The four-speed automatic and five-speed manual transmissions have also been carried over from the pre-facelift model.

==== Equipment ====
The most significant changes in the facelifted Perodua Myvi would amount to the increased equipment and kit levels across the range. Despite that, projector headlamps and Bluetooth connectivity were no longer standard. The 1.3L and 1.5L models are differentiated with unique bumpers and alloy rims. The 1.3L Standard G model, the base model of the range, is fitted with a simple radio with CD-player head unit, while the more expensive 1.3L Premium X and 1.5L SE models add MP3/WMA, USB and Bluetooth functions. The range-topping 1.5L Advance variant is equipped with a multimedia system and navigation, as well as a reverse camera. Both 1.3L models are fitted with standard fabric seats, while the 1.5L SE sports fabric semi-bucket seats, which is leather-wrapped in the 1.5L Advance. Additionally, all models with the exception of the 1.3L Standard G feature front corner sensors. The 1.3L models are fitted with standard halogen headlamps, whereas the 1.5L variants feature projector headlamps with guide lights, a first for a B-segment Malaysian-made car. Other new additions include the well-received anti-snatch hook first seen in the Perodua Axia, as well as a retractable cup holder under the driver's right side air conditioning vent.

==== Safety ====
ASEAN NCAP test results Perodua Myvi (2015) (2014)
Test	Points	Stars
Adult occupant:	11.55	4 /5 stars
Child occupant:	71%	4 /5 stars
Safety assist:	NA	

Perodua claims that the 2015 Myvi has achieved a 4-star ASEAN NCAP rating thanks to added safety equipment. However, the Standard G base model still lacks an anti-lock braking system (ABS) with electronic brakeforce distribution (EBD) and brake assist (BA). The Premium X, SE and Advance models have ABS with EBD and BA, but the airbag count remains at two, with only the driver and front passenger compartments being protected. Electronic stability control (ESC) or a traction control system (TCS) is still not offered. Despite Perodua's claims that the 2015 Myvi is 4-star ASEAN NCAP rated, it is likely that the rating only applies to the Premium X, SE and Advance models and not to the Standard G base model which lacks ABS with EBD and BA.

=== Export ===
The second generation Perodua Myvi was also rebadged as the Daihatsu Sirion for the Indonesian market. It was launched on 23 July 2011 at the 2011 Indonesia International Motor Show. Like the previous generation Sirion, the new Sirion is also imported as a CBU model from Perodua's factory in Rawang, Malaysia. The second generation Sirion sold in Indonesia is based on the Perodua Myvi in its mid-range Premium trim level. Apart from the different badges, steering wheel and the lack of airbags and ABS, the second generation Sirion is largely identical to the Myvi Premium. At launch, the new Daihatsu Sirion is available with 5-speed manual and 4-speed automatic transmission options.

PT Astra Daihatsu Motor sold 2,857, 6,663 and 2,374 units of Sirion in 2011, 2012 and 2013 respectively.

In February 2015, the second generation Myvi facelift was launched in Indonesia. Available with either manual or automatic transmission, the Sirion that was sold in Indonesia was mainly based on the 1.5 SE trim sold in Malaysia but instead of having a 1.5-litre engine, the Indonesia market Sirion used a 1.3-litre engine. Other notable difference from the Malaysian 1.5 SE trim included the instrument cluster from the Malaysian market 1.3 Premium X and a headunit system that was not used in any Myvi's bound for the Malaysian market.

Since April 2016, Perodua's official distributor in Brunei, GHK Motors Sdn Bhd launched the facelifted 2nd generation Myvi in 1.5 SE variant only, which replaced the previous Japanese-built 1st and 2nd generation Daihatsu Sirion (based on the Storia and Boon). The car was featured with either 4-speed automatic or 5-speed manual transmission options.

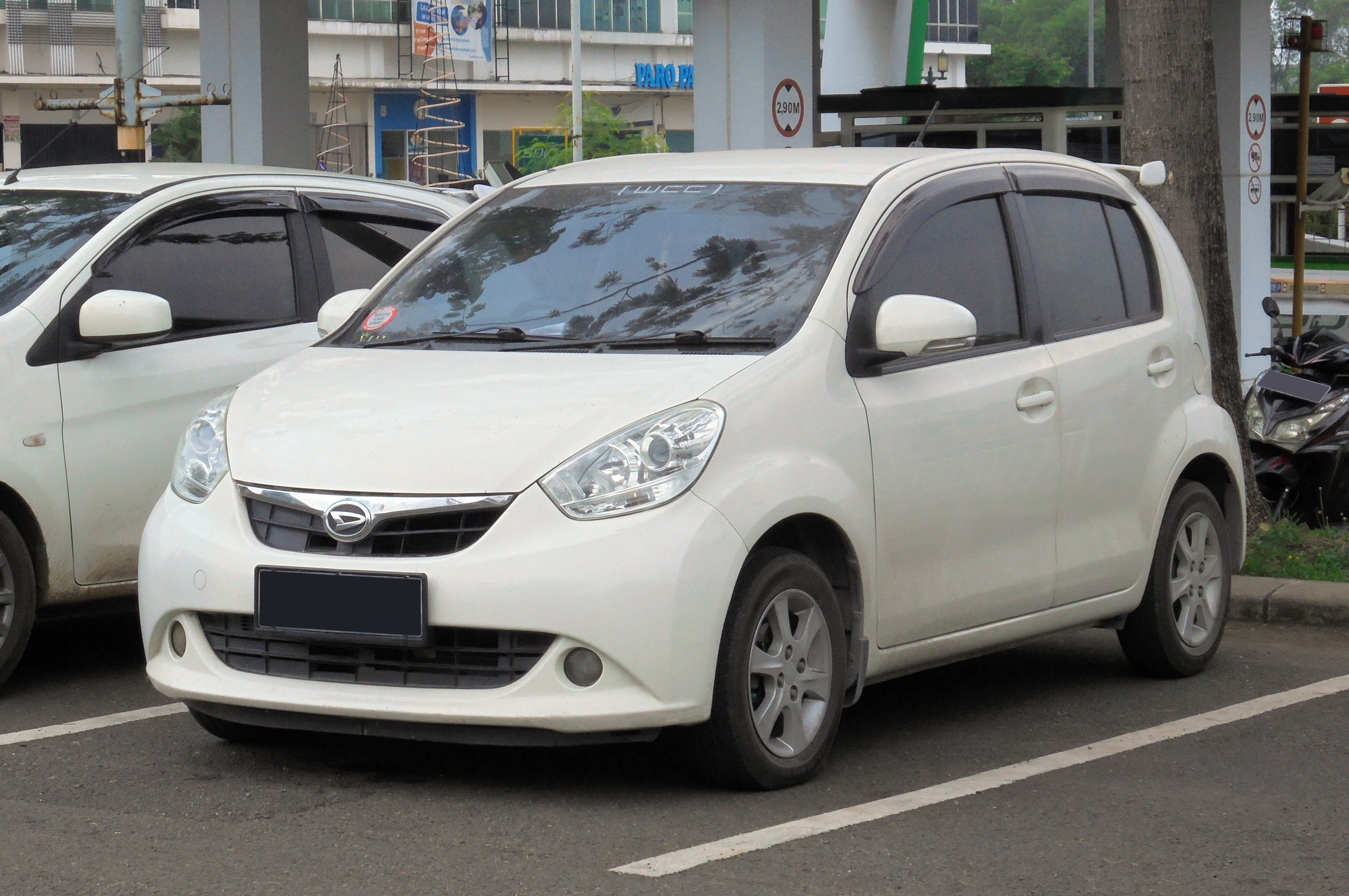
2011–2015 Daihatsu Sirion in Indonesia

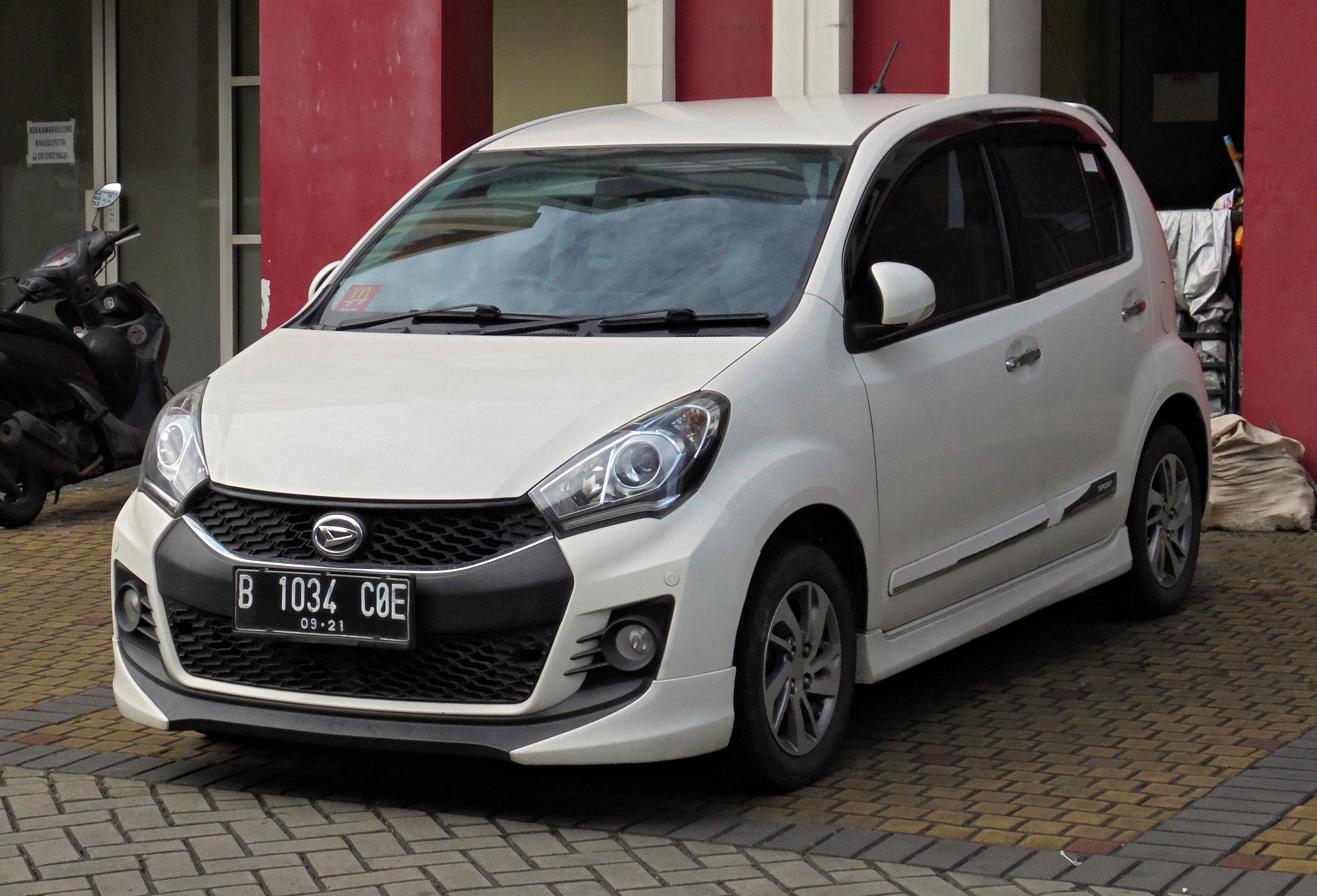
2015–2018 Daihatsu Sirion 1.3 Sport (facelift) in Indonesia

== Third generation (M800; 2017) ==
Third generation
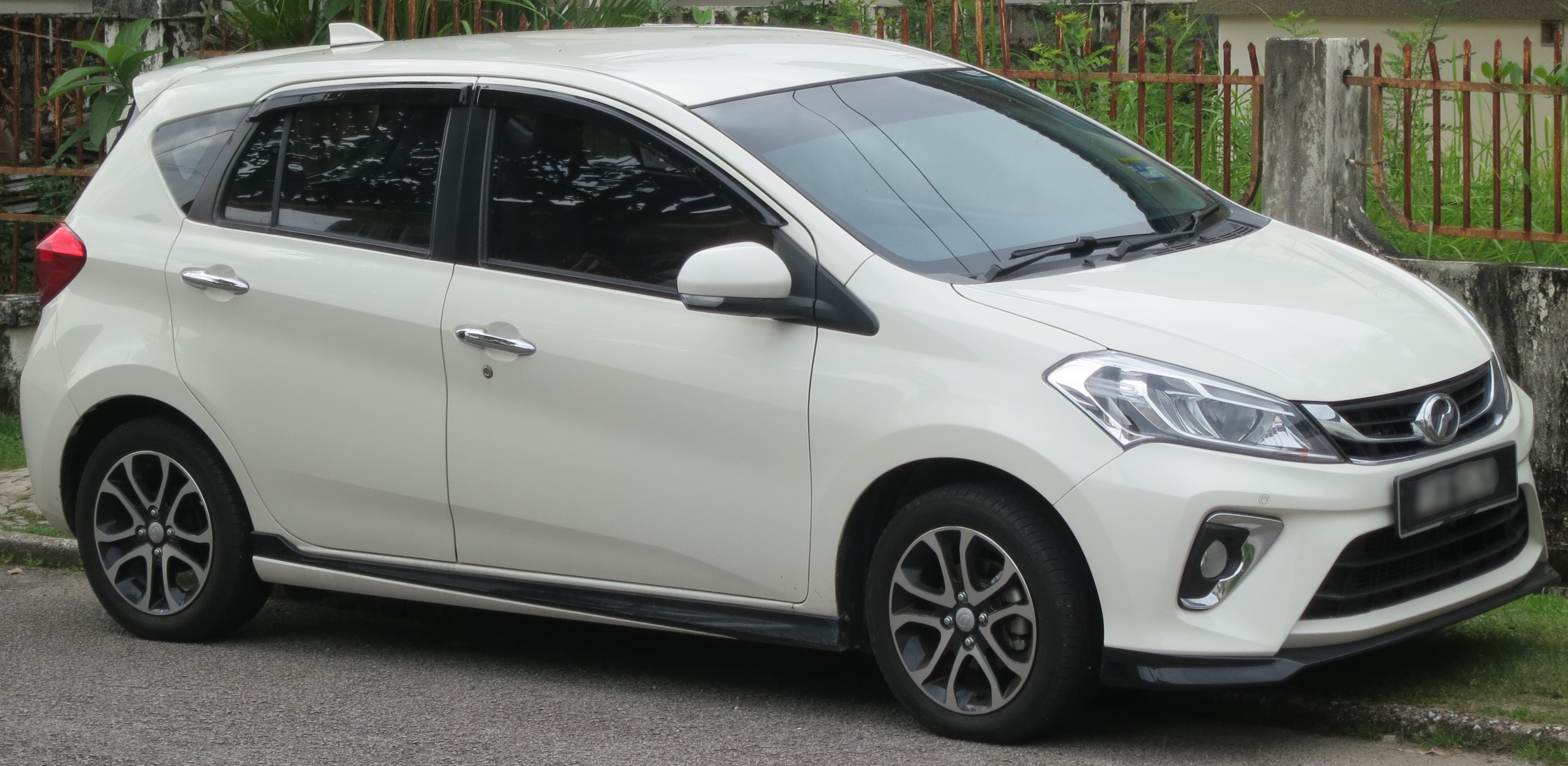

Overview
- Model code: M800
- Also called: Daihatsu Sirion (Indonesia, February 2018 – present)
- Production: November 2017 – present
- Designer: Muhamad Zamuren Musa

Powertrain
- Engine: 1.3 L 1NR-VE I4 (petrol); 1.5 L 2NR-VE I4 (petrol)
- Transmission: 5-speed manual (1.3 G only, 2017–2021); 4-speed automatic (2017–2021); CVT (2021–present)

Dimensions
- Wheelbase: 2,500 mm (98.4 in)
- Length: 3,895 mm (153.3 in)
- Width: 1,735 mm (68.3 in)
- Height: 1,515 mm (59.6 in)
- Kerb weight: 955–1,025 kg (2,105–2,260 lb)

=== Pre-launch ===
A third generation of the Perodua Myvi had been rumored to come in the late 2017/early 2018. On 8 November 2017, Perodua announced that bookings for the 2018 Perodua Myvi have been opened. The third generation Perodua Myvi made its public debut at the Malaysia Autoshow at MAEPS in Serdang on 9–12 November 2017. Although during this time, the car was parked in a box that featured multiple cut outs only allowing for sneak peeks. The third generation Perodua Myvi was launched on 16 November 2017. It was developed under D20N project.

This generation of Myvi is entirely designed in-house by Perodua's own design and styling division led by Muhamad Zamuren Musa, who also designed the Perodua Bezza, without rebadging the third generation of Daihatsu Boon. It is a brand-new car, where Toyota only provided advice and engines to Perodua for the development of the new Myvi.

==== Exterior and Interior ====
Standard equipment across the lineup include LED reflector headlights, manual headlight leveling, LED taillights, electronic adjustable side mirrors, reverse sensors, full size spare tyre, keyless entry and start, all round power windows with auto driver's window, digital air conditioning controls, tilt adjustable steering wheel, height adjustable driver seat, 60:40 split folding rear seats, and integrated shopping hook and anti-snatch hook. 1.3 variants come with 14" alloy wheels with a 7-spoke directorial design while 1.5 variants come with 15" alloy wheels with a 5 dual-spoke design with a dual-tone finish. Standard G variant features a silver front grille and body-colored exterior door handles while other variants feature a chrome front grille and chrome exterior door handles. 1.5 variants adds on a front splitter, rear spoiler and dual tone side skirts and a rear bumper. Inside, the Standard G variant has silver trim surrounding the air con vents while other variants have chrome surrounds in addition to the additional silver and chrome highlights around the cabin. Standard G variants have an integrated headunit with radio and USB input. The Premium X and High variant gain Bluetooth connectivity and the Advance variant gets a touchscreen headunit with a reverse camera, GPS and smartphone mirroring function. The Premium X variant gains a USB port, leather wrapped steering wheel with multi-function buttons and rear seats with adjustable headrests. The 1.5 High variant adds on a built-in toll reader and the Advance model adds on security window tint film and leather upholstery. Other variants uses fabric upholstery.

During the 2018 KL International Motor Show, a Myvi GT concept was shown. Exterior changes compared to the standard Myvi includes a different front bumper, a red line in the headlamps that flows from the grille, flared wheel arches, 17" wheels, upgraded brakes, a larger rear spoiler, a different rear bumper and exposed tailpipes. For the interior, differences include red highlights, bucket seats and a flat-bottom steering wheel.

==== Update ====
In July 2020, the Perodua Myvi received minor updates. Updates include enhanced safety features and revised colour choices. ASA 2.0 was added and made available as standard on all 1.5 variants and optional on the 1.3 Premium X variant. Granite Grey which was previously exclusive to 1.5 variants was also made available on 1.3 Premium X variant.

==== Powertrain ====
The engines provided for the Myvi were modified by Perodua to improve fuel efficiency and acquire the Energy Efficient Vehicle (EEV) standard as with the Axia and Bezza. Two engines are available:

1. 1NR-VE engine with a displacement of 1,329 cc (1.3 litre) that produces 70 kW(95 ps; 94 hp) at 6000 rpm and 121 Nm(89 lb⋅ft; 12.3 kgf.m) at 4000 rpm.
2. 2NR-VE engine with a displacement of 1,496 cc (1.5 litre) that produces 76 kW(103 ps; 102 hp) at 6000 rpm and 137 Nm(101 lb⋅ft; 14.0 kgf.m) at 4200 rpm.

Both engines have double overhead camshaft and dual variable valve timing branded as Dual VVT-i.

The 1.3 litre engine can be had with either a 5-speed manual or 4-speed automatic. Unlike the previous generation Myvi, the 1.5 litre engine can be had with only a 4-speed automatic.

==== Safety ====
The first time ever in a Malaysian branded car, the Myvi offers 'Advanced Safety Assist' in the top of the line 1.5 AV Variant.

Advanced Safety Assist or (A.S.A.) includes:

- PCW (Pre-Collision Warning)
- PCB (Pre-Collision Braking)
- FDA (Front Departure Alert)
- PMC (Pedal Misoperation Control)

ASEAN NCAP test results Perodua Myvi (2017) (2017)
Test	Points
Overall:	5 /5 stars
Adult occupant:	45.43
Child occupant:	22.01
Safety assist:	20.83

=== Facelift ===
The facelifted third generation Myvi was launched on 18 November 2021. The Perodua Smart Drive Assist (PSDA), also known as ASA 3.0, replaces the ASA 2.0 in the outgoing pre-facelift Myvi and it is standard on all variants except for the base 1.3 G, which is optional. There are 5 variants on offer. The 1.3-litre engine option now consists of only 2 variants, the base G and G with PSDA, while the 1.5-litre engine option now consists of the X, H and AV variants. The 4-speed automatic that has been in use since the first generation Myvi has been replaced by a D-CVT that is also found in the Perodua Ativa. The D-CVT is the only transmission option. The 5-speed manual transmission that was previously offered only on 1.3-litre variants was dropped due to low sales of only 1 percent. The range-topping AV variant gets new features including adaptive cruise control, blind spot monitoring, rear cross traffic alert and lane departure warning with lane departure prevention.

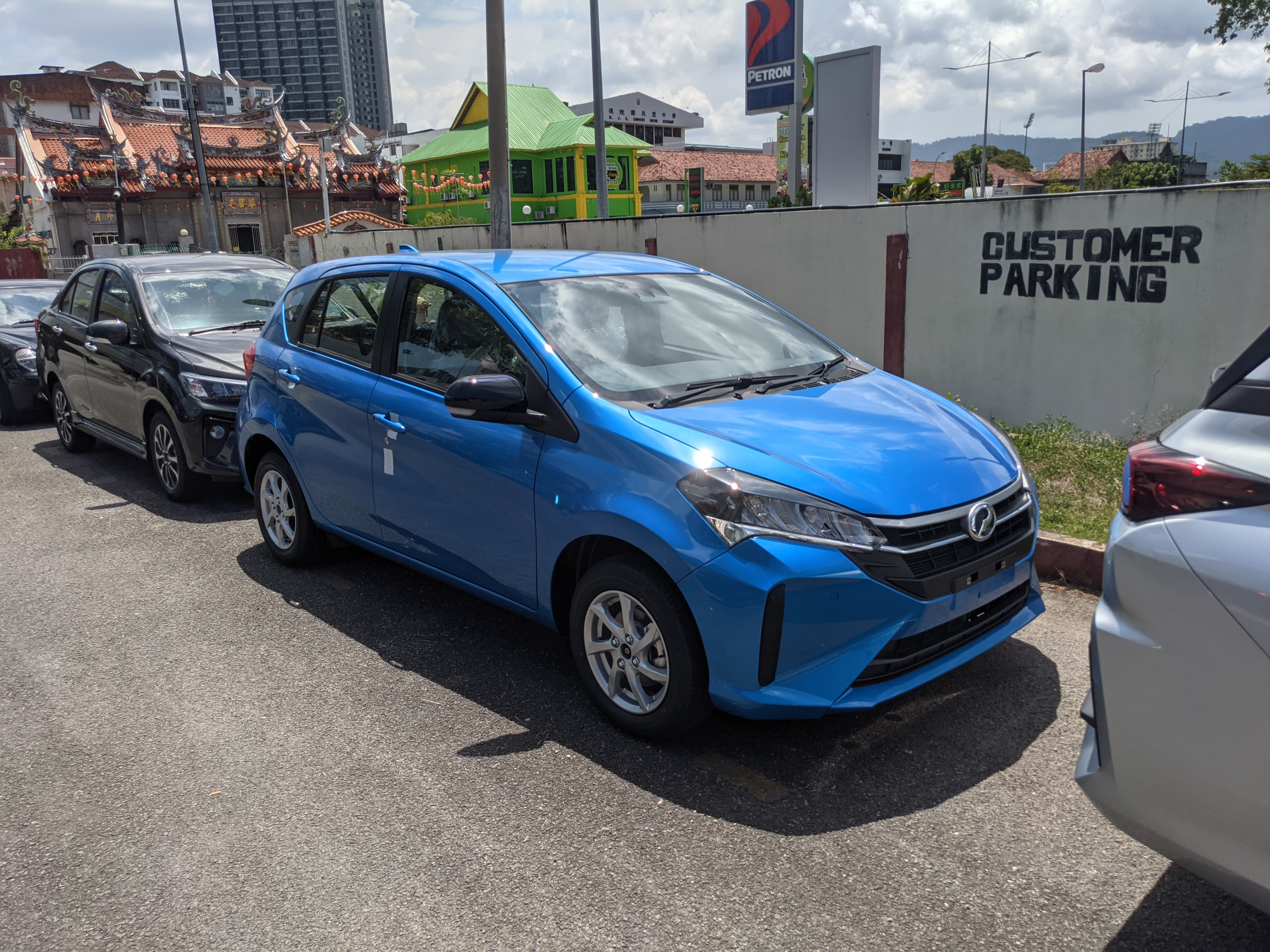
2021–present Perodua Myvi 1.3 G (facelift)

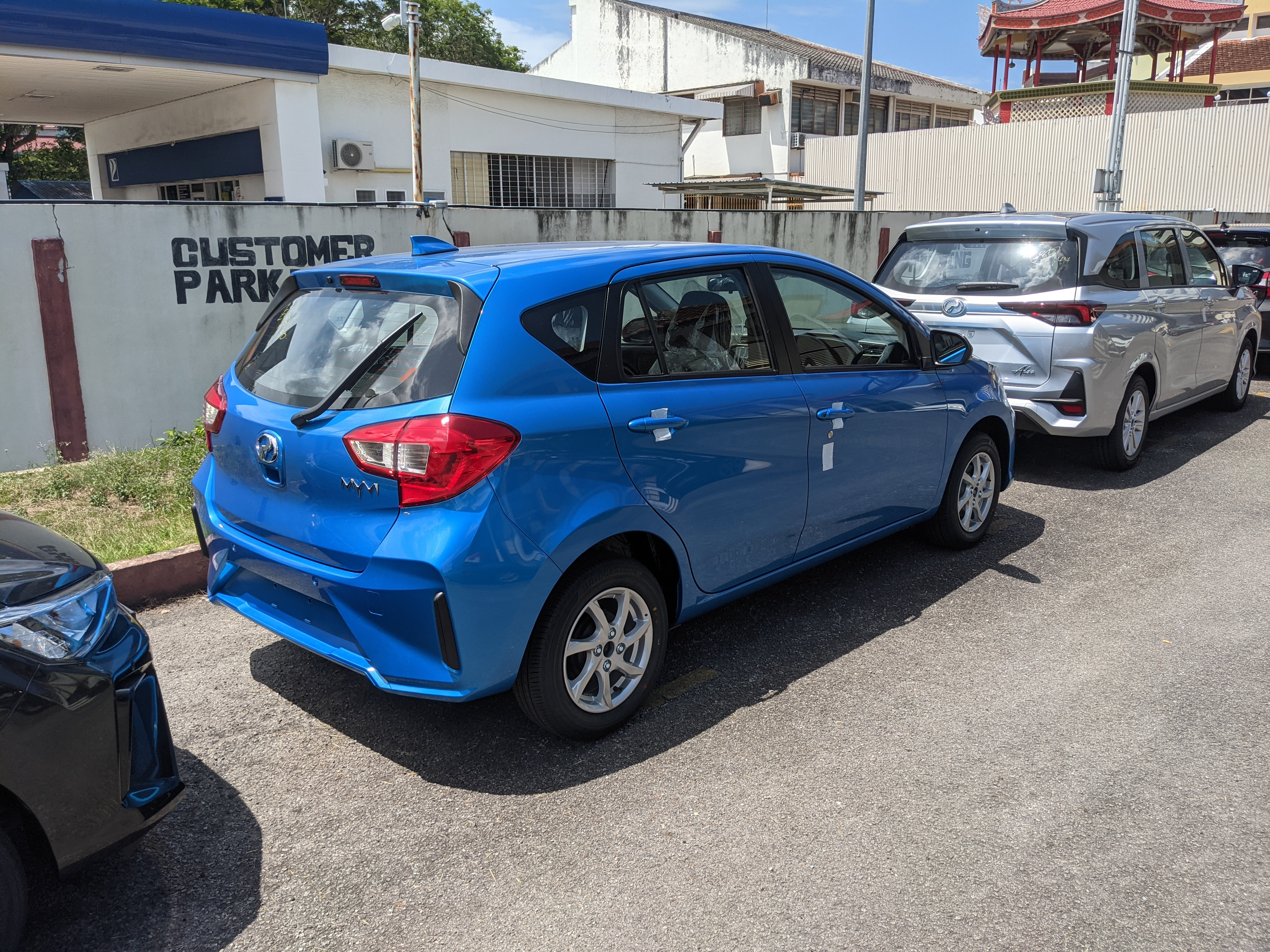
2021–present Perodua Myvi 1.3 G (facelift)

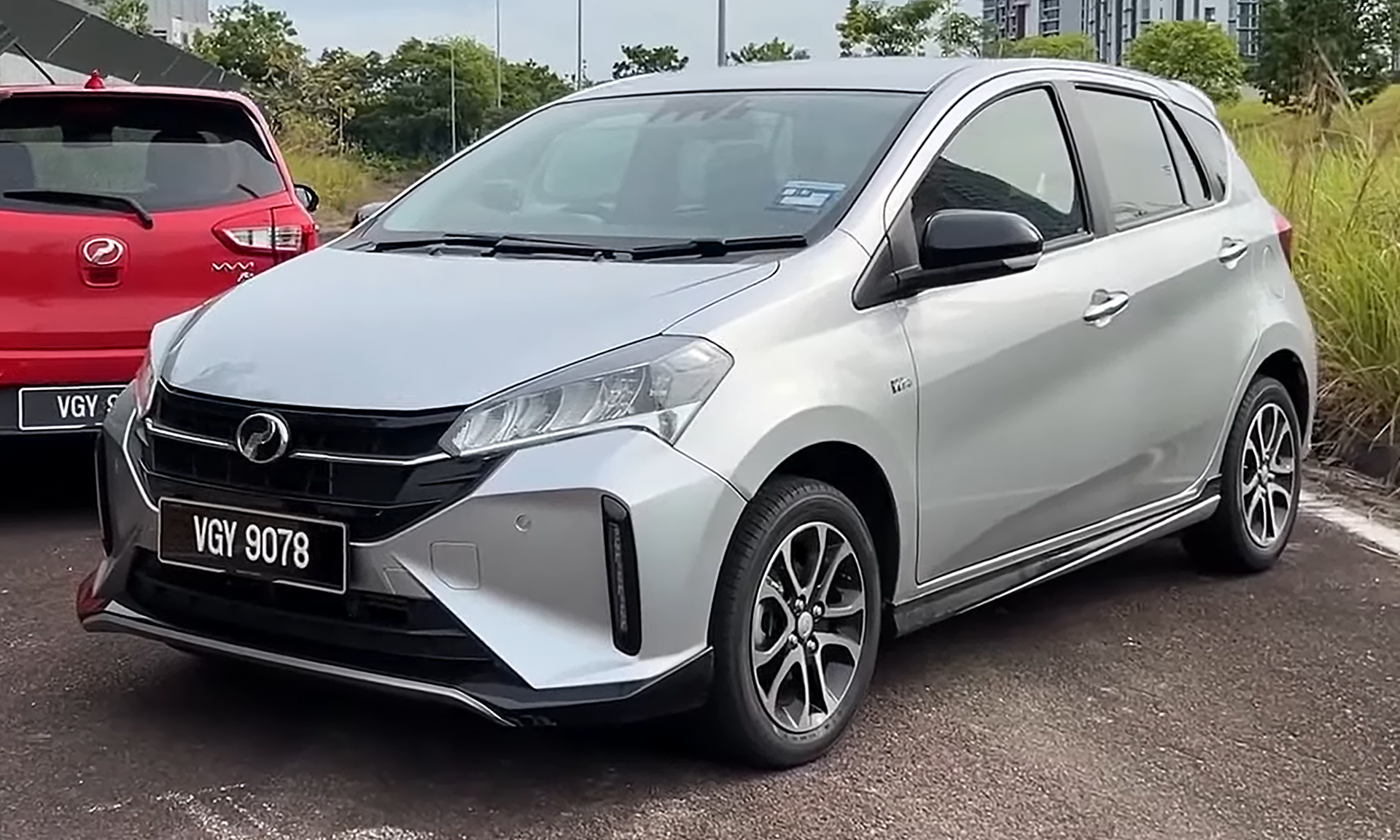
2021–present Perodua Myvi 1.5 AV (facelift)

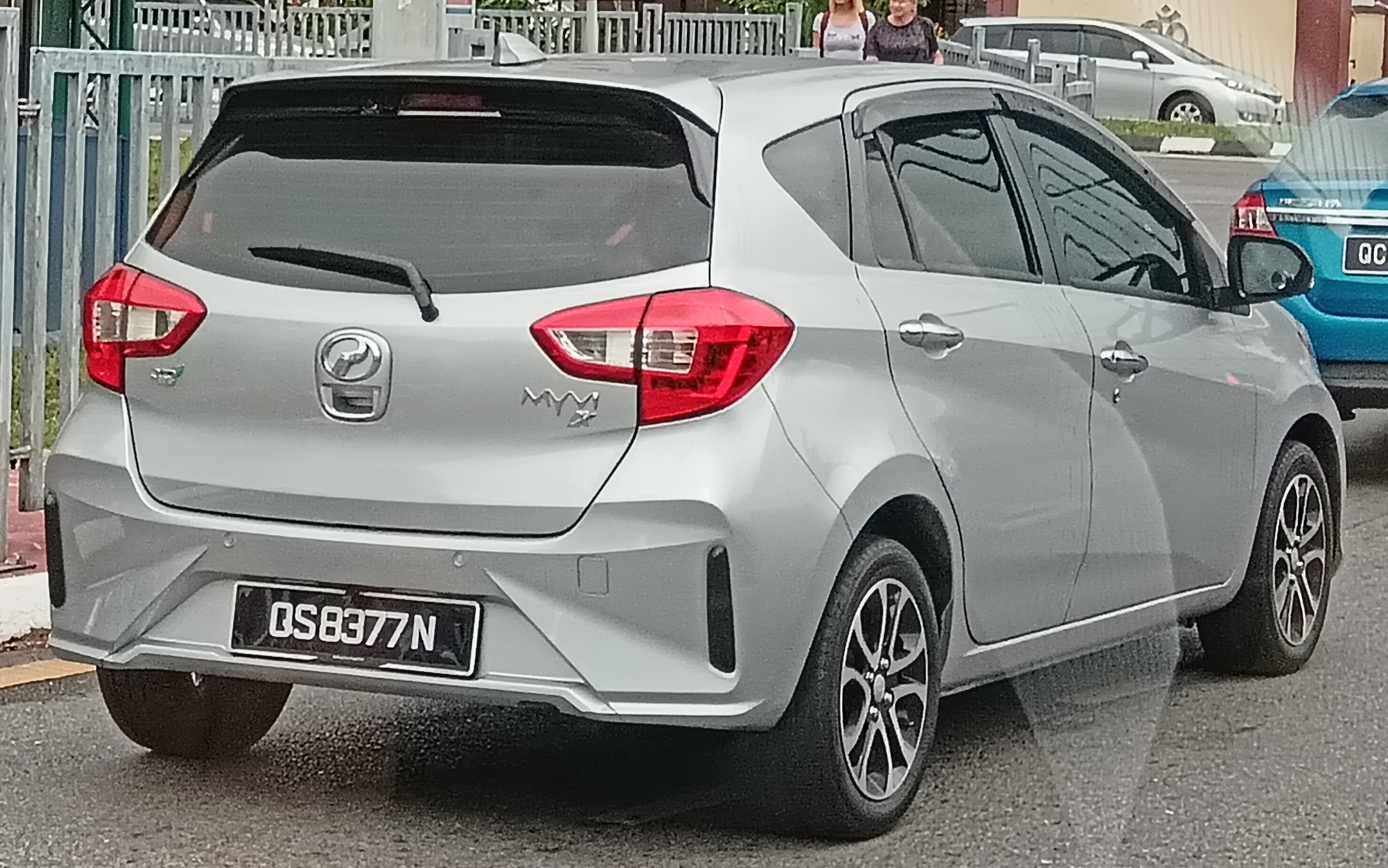
2021–present Perodua Myvi 1.5 X (facelift)

=== Export ===
The third generation Myvi was launched in Indonesia in February 2018 as the Daihatsu Sirion, Singapore in April 2019, Mauritius in August 2019 and Brunei in July 2020.

In Indonesia, the third generation Myvi is rebadged as the Daihatsu Sirion. The Indonesian specifications closely matches the Premium X variant available in the Myvi's domestic market apart from having 2 transmission options, the use of larger 15" alloy wheels from the domestic market 1.5 Myvi's on the outside and a touchscreen headunit on the inside. It was updated in March 2020 with revision to the exterior. Granite Grey and Electric Blue color option was made available and the automatic variant gained the cosmetic enhancements from the domestic market 1.5 Myvi's. It received a facelift on 2 June 2022 with two variants: 1.3 X and 1.3 R, both with CVT.

In Singapore, 2 variants are available: 1.3 X and 1.5 H, while in Mauritius, 2 variants are available: 1.3 G and 1.5 H.

In Brunei, 2 variants are available: 1.3 G with 4-speed automatic transmission only which specifications mirrors that of the domestic market 1.3 Standard G variant and S-Edition. The S-Edition is the 1.3 G variant with a different front fascia, additional lower lip to the rear bumpers, side skirts, stickers on the side and different wheels. It has been confirmed that the additions seen on the S-Edition are done by Perodua's Brunei official distributor GHK Motors and not Perodua themselves. The facelift Myvi was not introduced in the Bruneian market upon its discontinuation in May 2023 due to very slow sales.

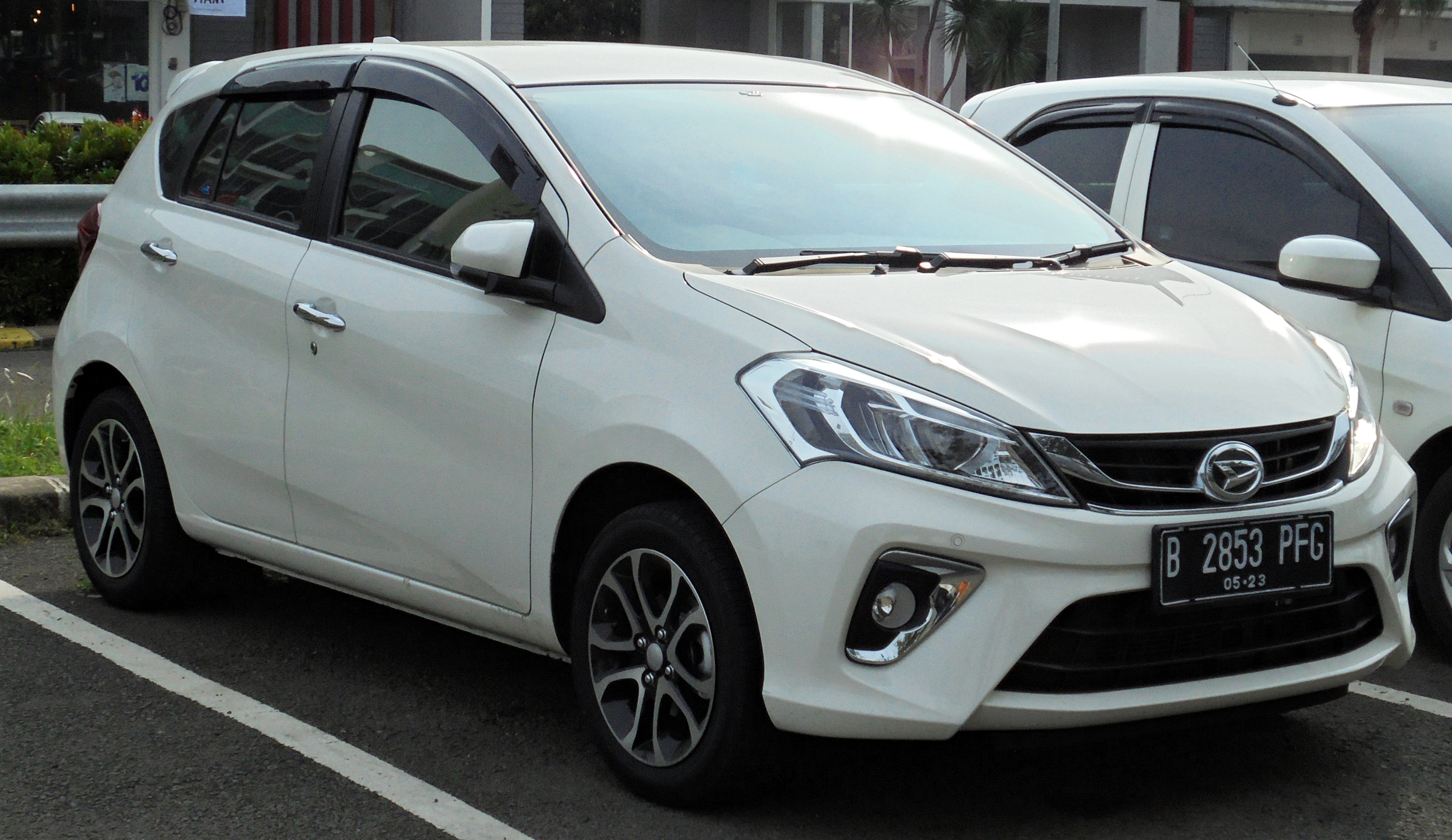
2018–2022 Daihatsu Sirion in Indonesia

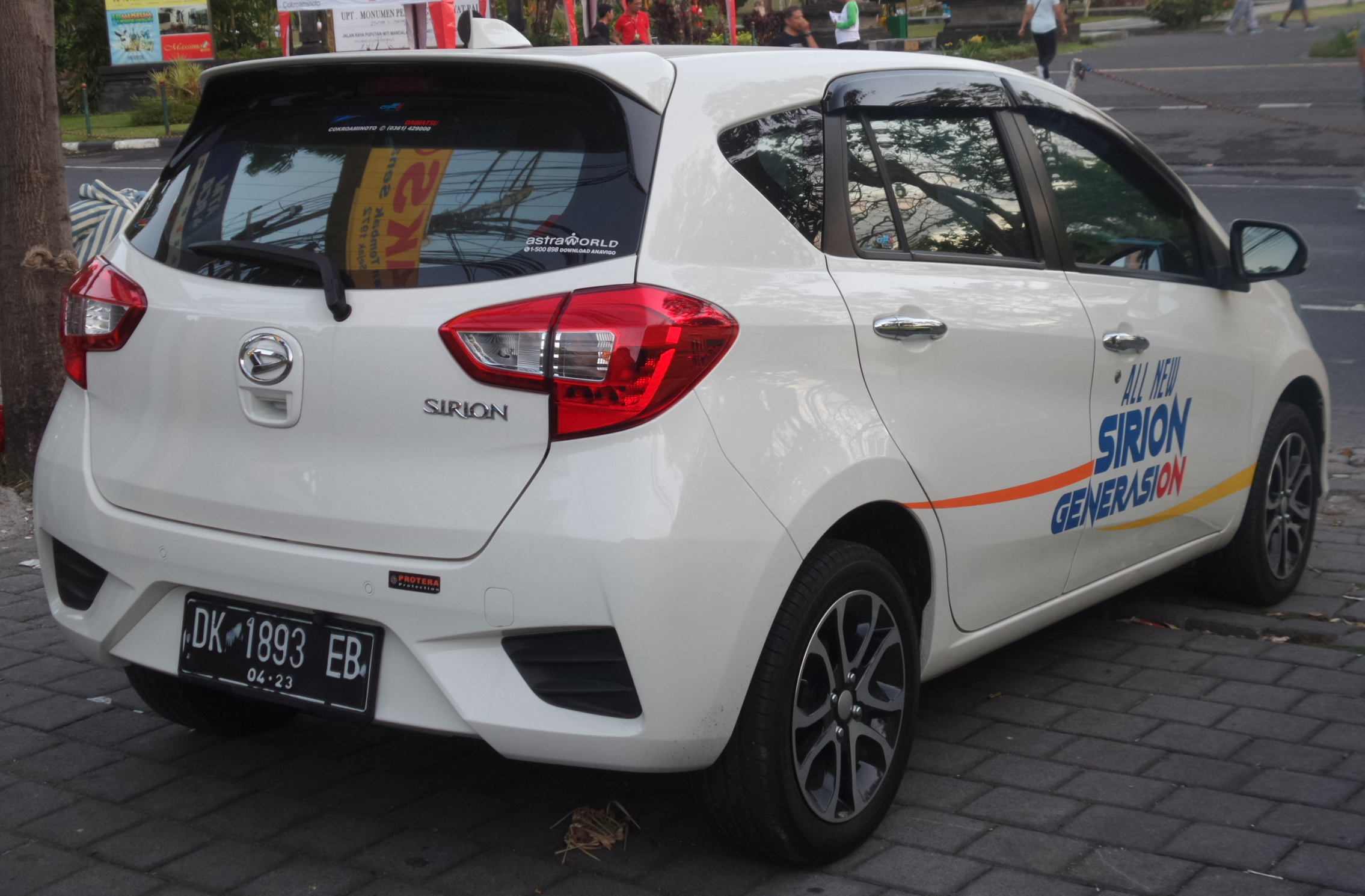
2018–2022 Daihatsu Sirion in Indonesia

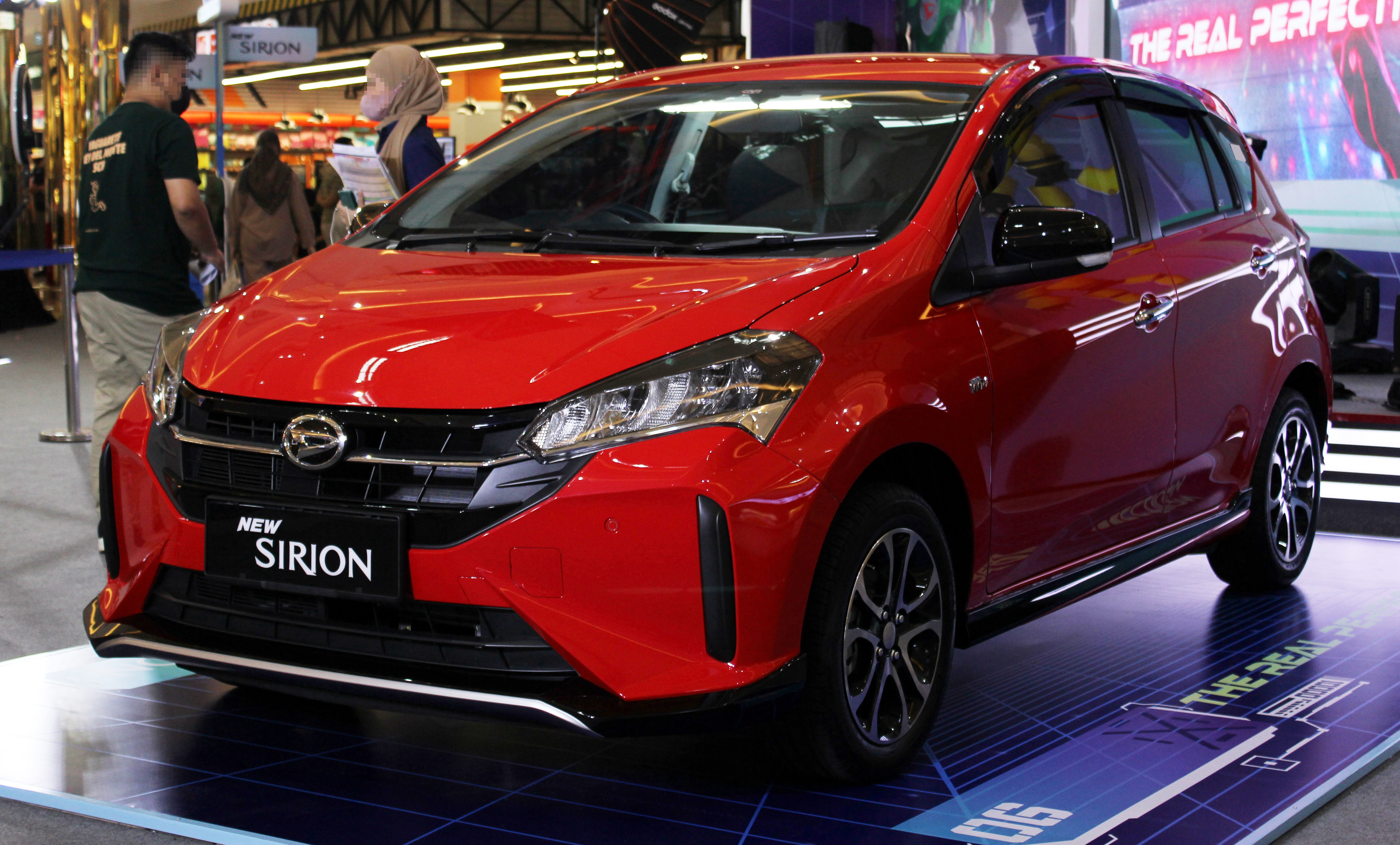
2022–present Daihatsu Sirion R (facelift) in Indonesia

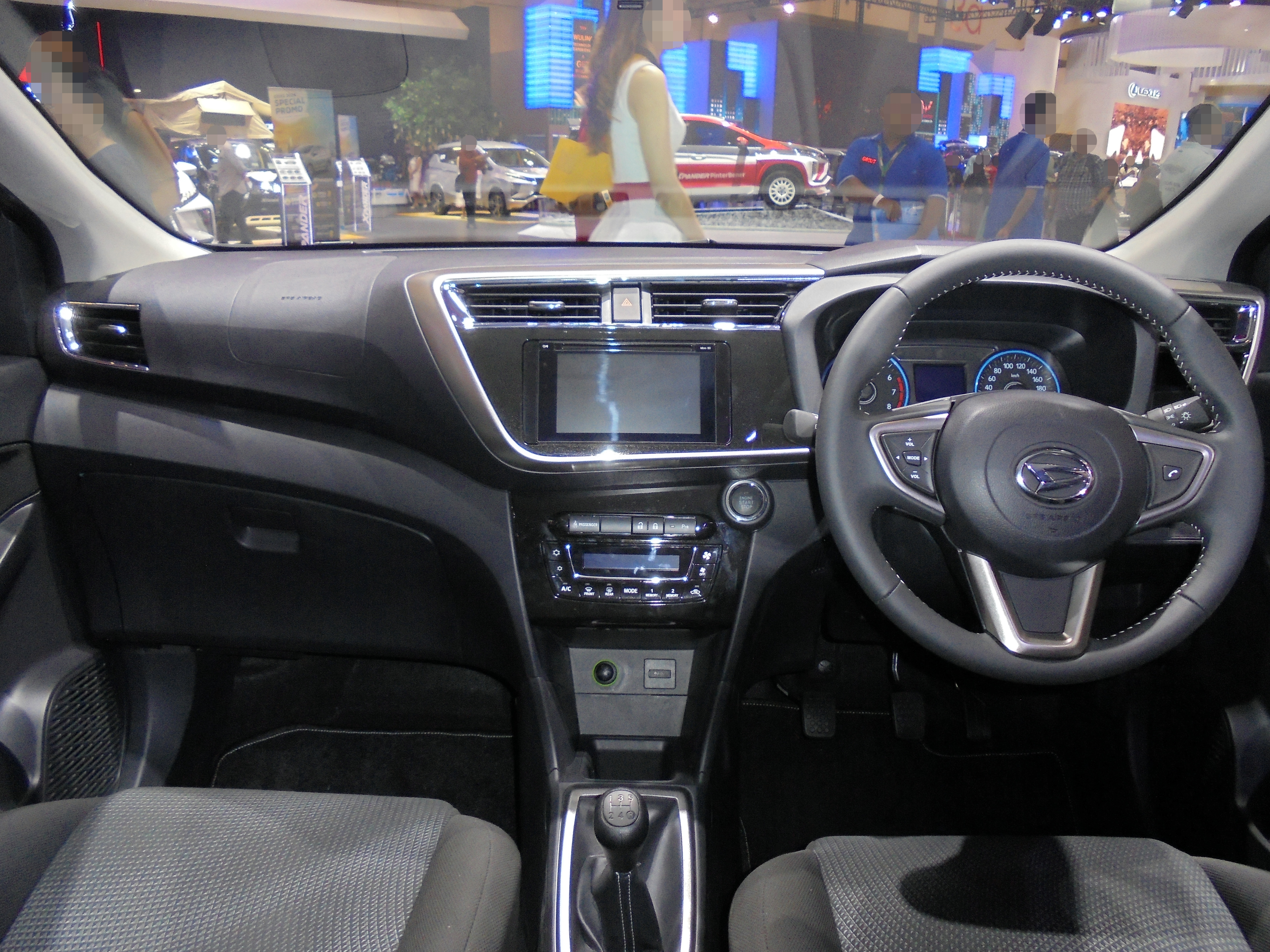
2018–2022 Daihatsu Sirion interior in Indonesia

=== Reception ===
==== Sales ====
It was reported that after one week from launch, 1,000 units had been delivered. Then after one month of being on sale, in December 2017, it was reported that 4,500 units were delivered. 2 1/2 months after launch in January 2018, 11,000 units were delivered. It was also revealed that 1.5 models accounted for 85% of the bookings. 28,000, 38,000 units and 100,000 units delivered was reported in March 2018, May 2018 and in February 2019 respectively.

In August 2018, a supply disruption at one of the vendors caused a temporary halt to Myvi productions. Perodua Myvi is promoted as the best selling car in Malaysia for 12 years out of 16 years since 2006. The current highest sales record is during 2021 with 47,525 units sold.

==== Reviews ====
The third generation Myvi has received generally favourable reviews from critics in its domestic market. Malaysian automotive journalist Hafriz Shah from paultan.org commended the Myvi's looks, quality and features. Overall package offered were exceptionally praised, in which Shah claimed if you are looking to buy a car under RM100k, do take a look at the Myvi first. "It really is that good." However Shah also criticised the small speedometer, having only one compartment for items, and the headunits English. Kon from evomalaysia.com commended the Myvi's being stylish, affordable, and practical but commented that it is not for enthusiasts and "that the predecessor was more spacious inside."

==== Awards and accolades ====
- Budget Car - iCar Asia People's Choice Awards 2017
- Best 3 Compact Hatch of Malaysia - Aurizn Awards 2018 'Cars of Malaysia'
- Vehicle of the Year 2018 - DSF.my Allianz Vehicle of the Year (VOTY) 2018
- Best Compact Hatch - Carsifu Editor's Choice Awards 2018
- Compact Hatch (Gold Winner) - Carlist.my People's Choice Awards 2018
- Entry Level Car of the Year - Malaysia Car of the Year (COTY) 2018
- Malaysia's Good Design Mark 2018
- Best 3 City Cars - 2019 'Cars of Malaysia'

== Sales ==
Year	Malaysia (Note: Figures based on registration)
2005	34,050
2006	80,322
2007	84,709
2008	88,219
2009	90,594
2010	77,652
2011	81,897
2012	91,085
2013	98,936
2014	82,377
2015	74,227
2016	51,232
2017	55,846
2018	82,121
2019	81,964
2020	66,328
2021	47,520
2022	74,837
2023	71,155
2024	72,214
2025	72,724
