= Sirion =

Sirion could refer to:

- Another name for Mount Hermon
- Daihatsu Sirion, a car made by Daihatsu
- River Sirion in the stories of J. R. R. Tolkien
