= Daihatsu Storia =

Daihatsu Storia (M100)
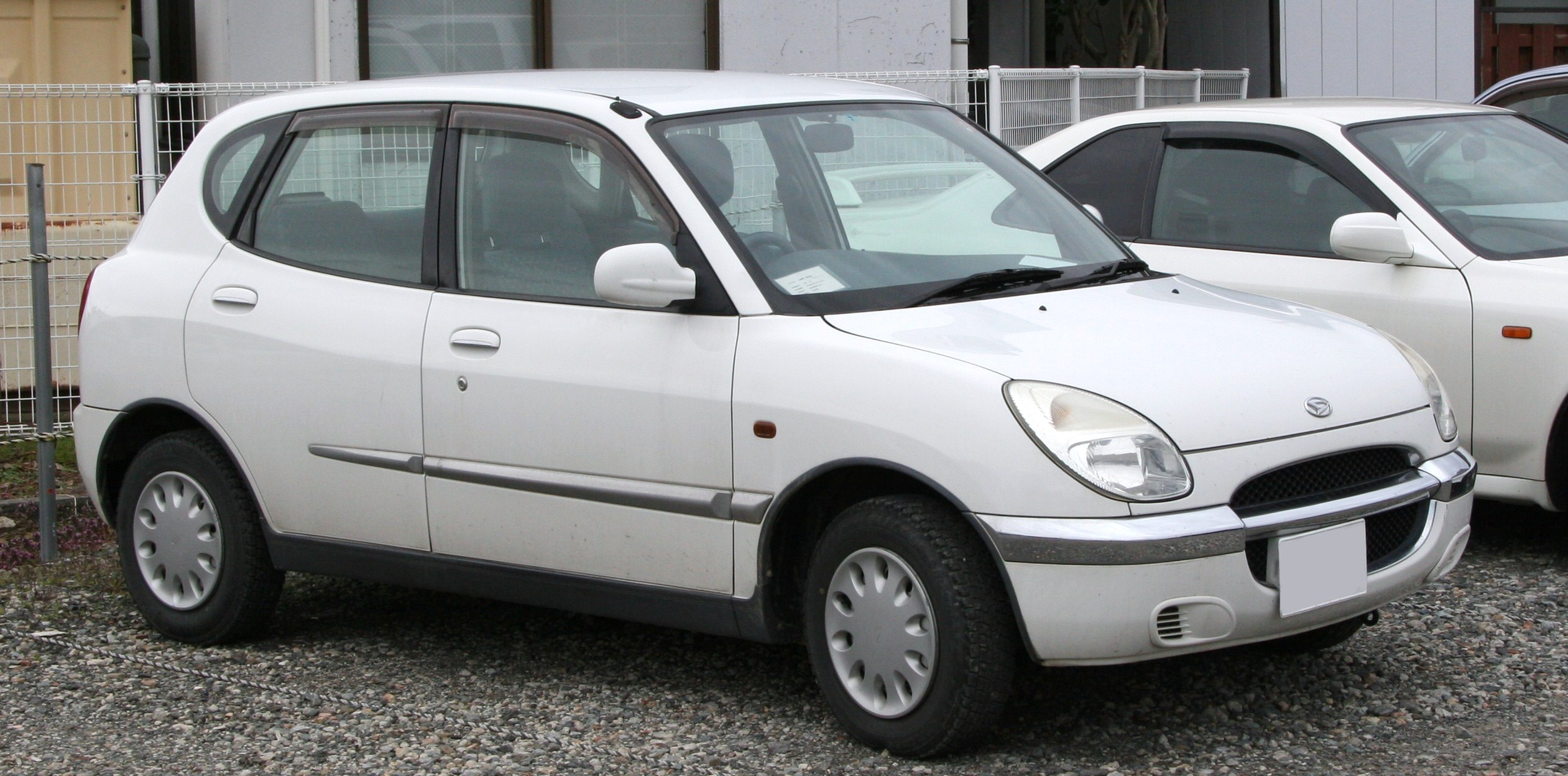
- 2000–2001 Daihatsu Storia (M100S; pre-facelift, Japan)

Overview
- Manufacturer: Daihatsu
- Also called: Toyota Duet (Japan); Daihatsu Sirion (international)
- Production: February 1998 – June 2005
- Assembly: Japan: Ikeda, Osaka (Ikeda plant)

Body and chassis
- Class: Subcompact car
- Body style: 5-door hatchback
- Layout: Front-engine, front-wheel-drive; Front-engine, four-wheel-drive
- Related: Daihatsu YRV

Powertrain
- Engine: Petrol: 713 cc JC-DET turbo I4 (Storia X4); 989 cc EJ-DE I3; 989 cc EJ-VE I3; 1298 cc K3-VE I4; 1298 cc K3-VE2 I4
- Power output: 88 kW (118 hp; 120 PS) (JC-DET); 44 kW (59 hp; 60 PS) (EJ-DE); 47 kW (63 hp; 64 PS) (EJ-VE); 66 kW (89 hp; 90 PS) (K3-VE); 81 kW (109 hp; 110 PS) (K3-VE2)
- Transmission: 5-speed manual; 4-speed automatic

Dimensions
- Wheelbase: 2,370 mm (93.3 in)
- Length: 3,660–3,690 mm (144.1–145.3 in)
- Width: 1,600 mm (63.0 in)
- Height: 1,435–1,450 mm (56.5–57.1 in)
- Curb weight: 820–920 kg (1,808–2,028 lb)

Chronology
- Predecessor: Daihatsu Charade (Storia); Toyota Corolla II (Duet)
- Successor: Daihatsu Boon (Storia); Toyota Passo (Duet)

The Daihatsu Storia (Japanese: ダイハツ・ストーリア, Hepburn: Daihatsu Sutōria) is a subcompact car/supermini which was produced by the Japanese automaker Daihatsu between 1998 and 2005. It effectively replaced the similar sized Charade, which was produced alongside it for a year. It was also sold as the Toyota Duet (Japanese: トヨタ・デュエット, Hepburn: Toyota Deyuetto) in Japan, which replaced the Corolla II. In international markets, with the exception of a few countries, the Storia was sold as the first-generation Daihatsu Sirion.

== History ==
The Storia/Sirion was presented as the NCX concept car at the 1997 Tokyo Motor Show. It was confirmed there for production for 1998. It has a retro inspired design with chrome features. The name "Storia" is Italian for "story/history".

The first change to the Storia came in 2000 with new DVVT engines, including a 1300cc one, and minor restyling. It had new tail lights and reverse lights on the left and right, minor change to the front grille, as well as interior style changes and handling refinement. This updated Storia was rolled out in Japan in May 2000 and by the end of the year in the United Kingdom and Australia for the 2001 model year.

In December 2001, the Storia/Sirion/Duet was facelifted; the front grille and bumper were changed for a sportier appearance and in some markets the silver accents on the sides were removed (retained for the GTvi model in Australia). The dash and interior were redesigned, incorporating more storage spaces, easier to use controls and higher quality trim. In Australia it was released in March 2002.

The Storia was replaced by the Daihatsu Boon, which in international markets became the second generation Daihatsu Sirion.

== Engines ==
The 1998 Storia/Duet (called Sirion outside Japan) came with two petrol engines (with multi-point fuel injection): a 989 cc three-cylinder engine with 44 kW (59 hp; 60 PS) and a 1.3-litre four-cylinder engine with 64 kW (86 hp; 87 PS) unit that came in 2000. Both were available with either a 5-speed manual or a 4-speed automatic transmission. The trim levels in the European market were the standard Sirion and the Sirion+ which added air conditioning, central locking and other equipment. They were named to the E and EL respectively in late 2000, with a new SL that had a 102 bhp 1.3 litre engine.

As of 2001, 1.3-litre models have 76 kW (102 hp; 103 PS) engines capable of accelerating from 0–100 km/h (0–62 mph) in 9.6 seconds and reaching a top speed of 179 km/h (111 mph). This engine has an average fuel consumption of 21.1 km/L (60 mpg_{‑imp}; 50 mpg_{‑US}) and the 989 cc models averaging 21.85 km/L (61.7 mpg_{‑imp}; 51.4 mpg_{‑US}).

The Australian market only had the 989 cc model up until early 2001, when the sporty 1.3-litre model, known as the GTvi, was added to the lineup. At the time, the GTvi model had the most powerful naturally aspirated engine available in its class, developing 75 kW (101 hp; 102 PS) at 7,500 rpm. In Australia, a sequential transmission option was made available in the GTvi version only from 2002. This was an electronically controlled 4-speed automatic transmission with sequential mode activated by a dashboard switch, then gear selection by buttons on the steering wheel.

== Versions ==
UK market exclusively received Rally versions of the Sirion: Rally 2 and Rally 4; the latter being the four-wheel drive version. The Rally models have a slightly increased engine output of 81 kW (109 hp; 110 PS) and has a 0–100 km/h (0–62 mph) time of 8.1 seconds (8.9 seconds for Rally 4) and reaching a top speed of 185 km/h (115 mph).

The 4Track (or just 4WD outside Japan) is a four-wheel drive version of the standard 1.3-litre model. The F-Speed is an automatic model which can be switched using a dashboard button to use push button sequential gear change on the steering wheel.

A version called the Storia X4 was released for racing in Japan. This model has a four-wheel drive layout with front and rear limited-slip differentials and is powered by a JC-DET 713 cc engine producing 88 kW (118 hp; 120 PS). The use of a slightly enlarged kei car engine on the X4 was designed to meet homologation regulations for 1-litre racing class, which imposes a displacement multiplier for turbocharged engines, while allowing for larger body that is not constrained to kei car-size regulations.

== Gallery ==
Storia

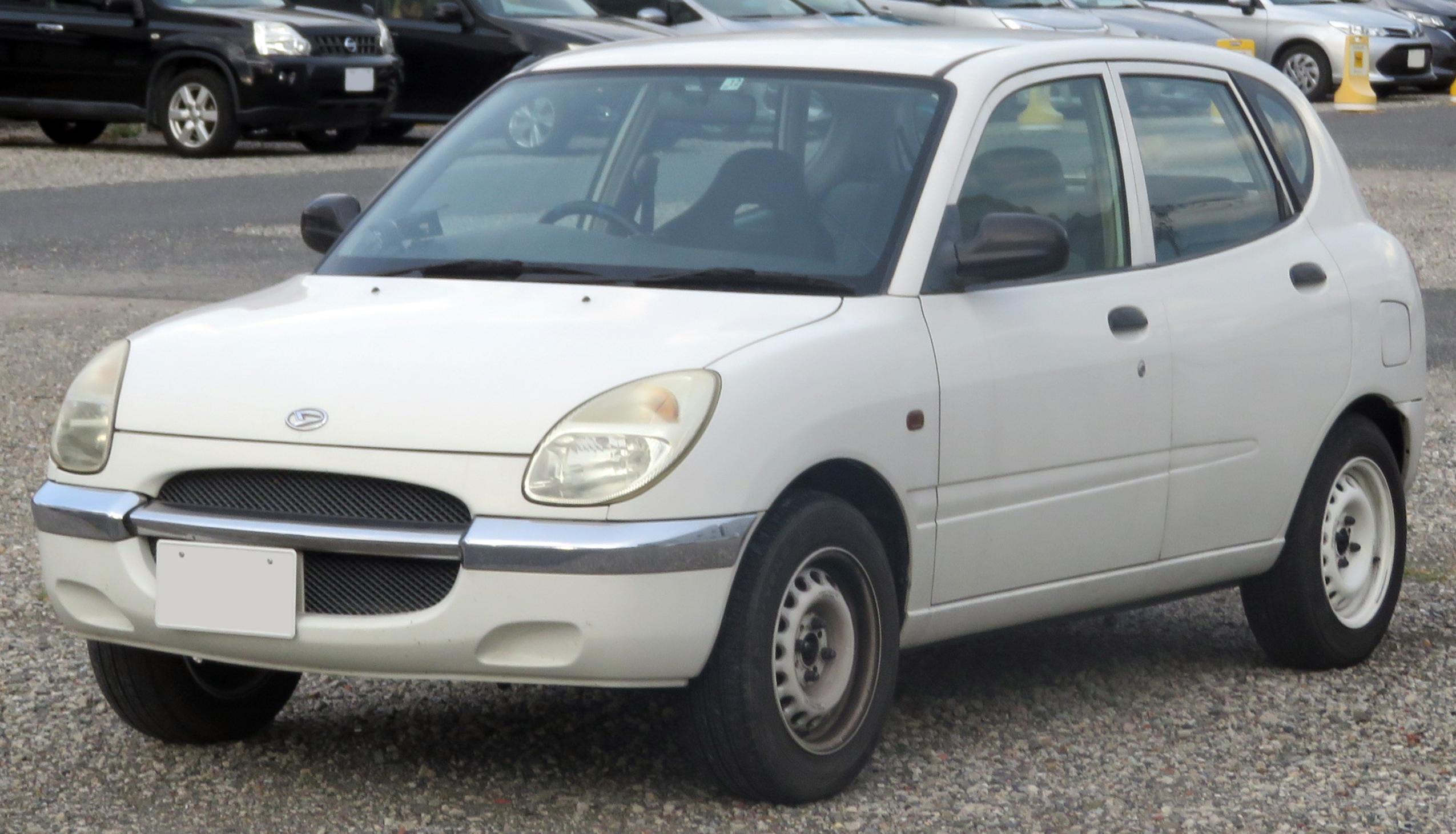
1998–2000 Storia X4 (M112S, Japan)

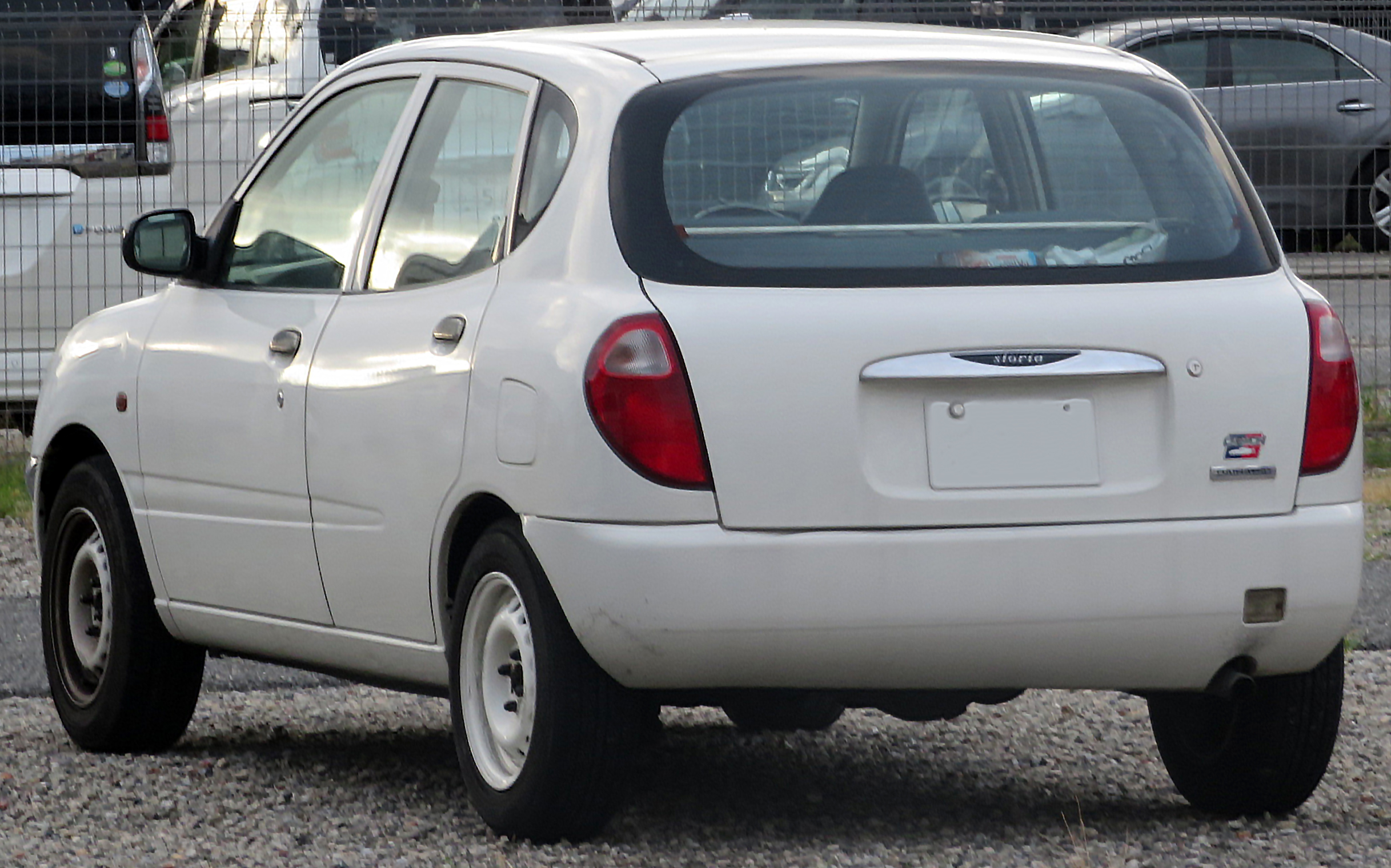
1998–2000 Storia X4 (M112S, Japan)

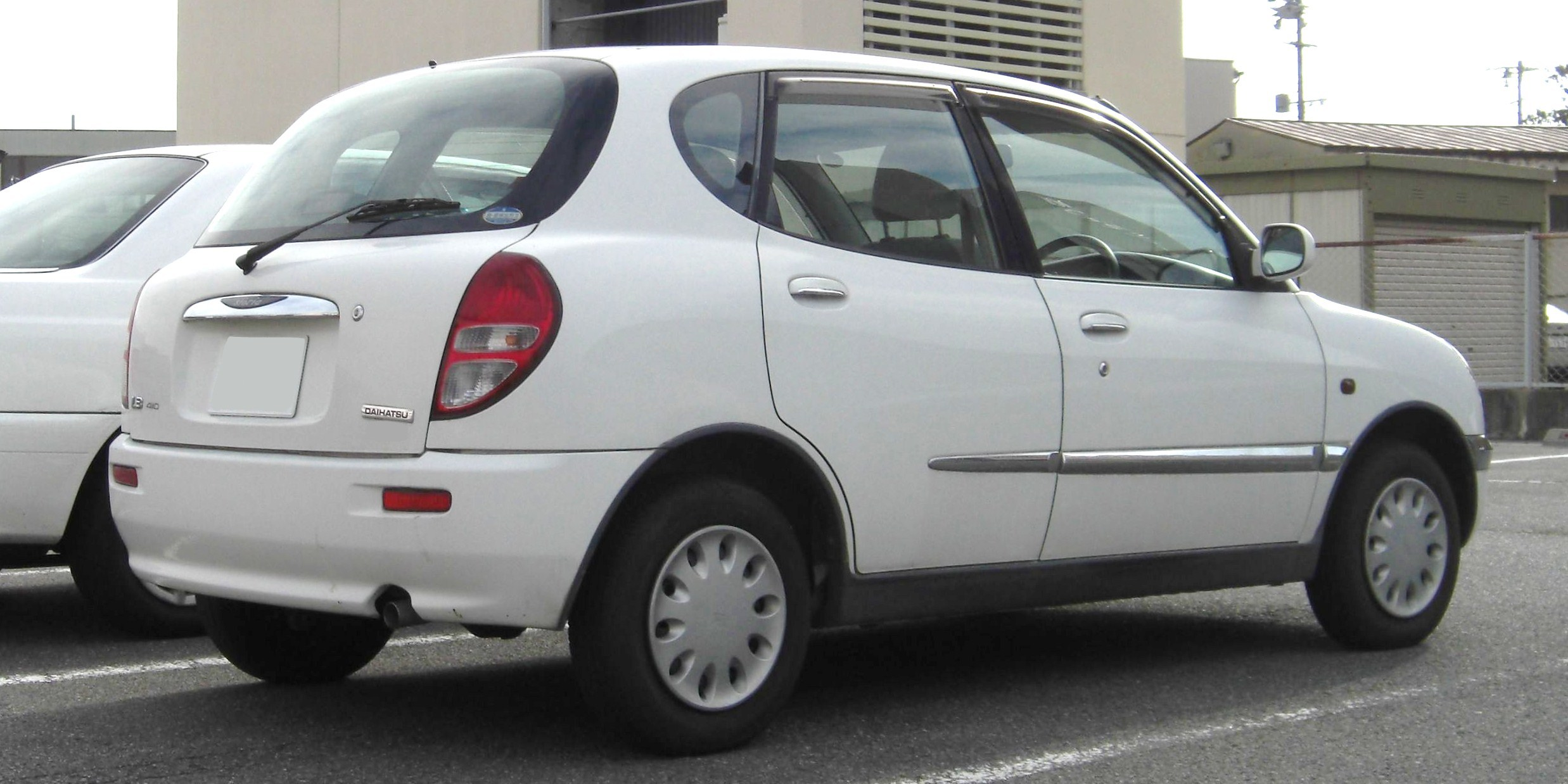
2000–2001 Storia (M100S; pre-facelift, Japan)

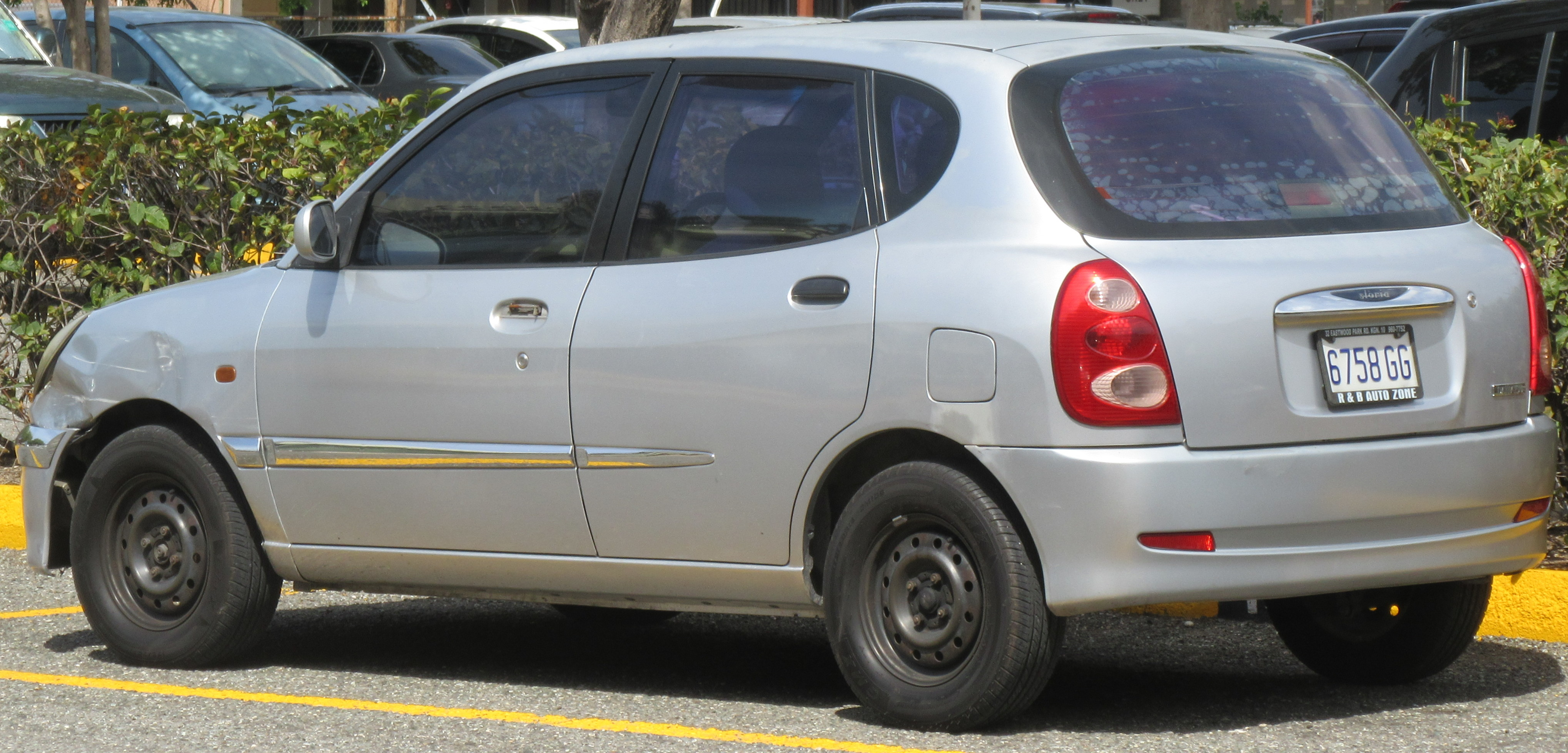
2001–2004 Storia (M100S; facelift, Japan)

Sirion

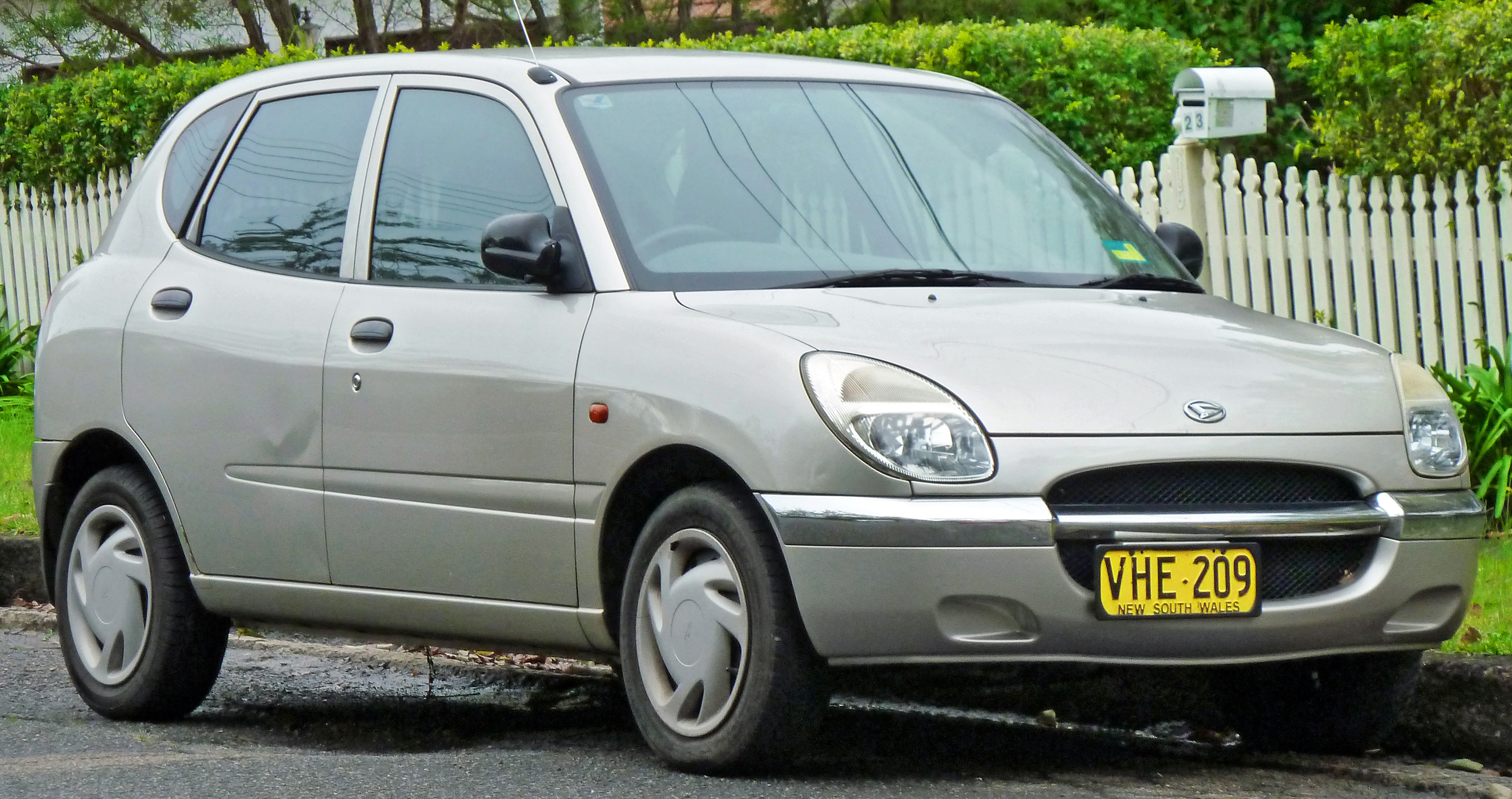
1998–2001 Daihatsu Sirion (M100RS; pre-facelift, Australia)

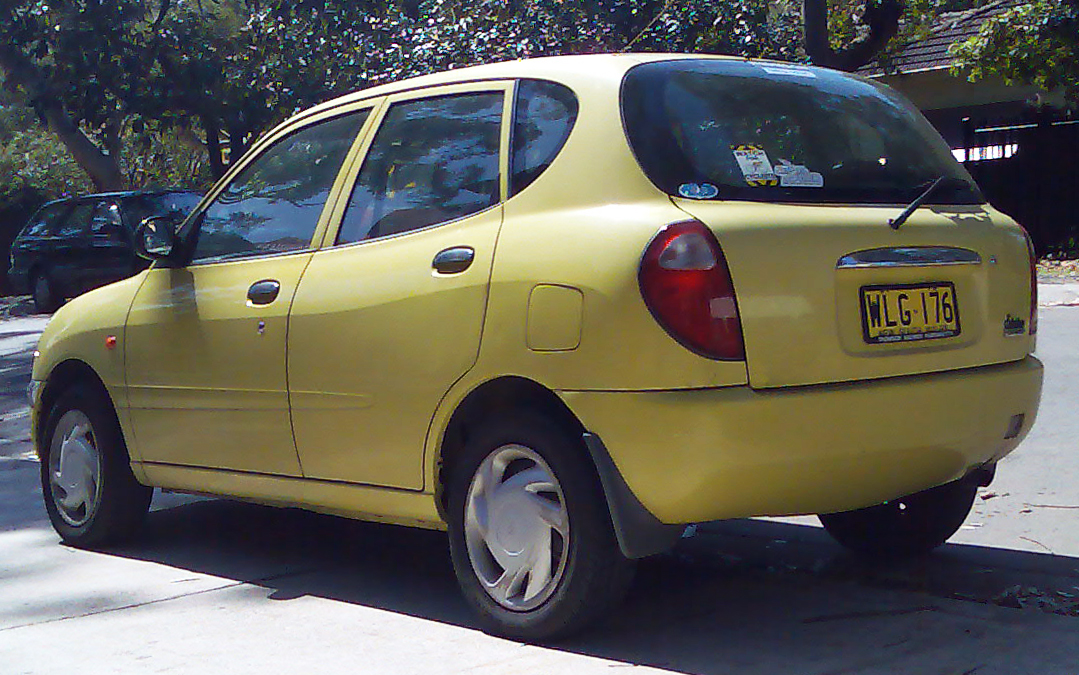
1998–2001 Sirion (M100RS; pre-facelift, Australia)

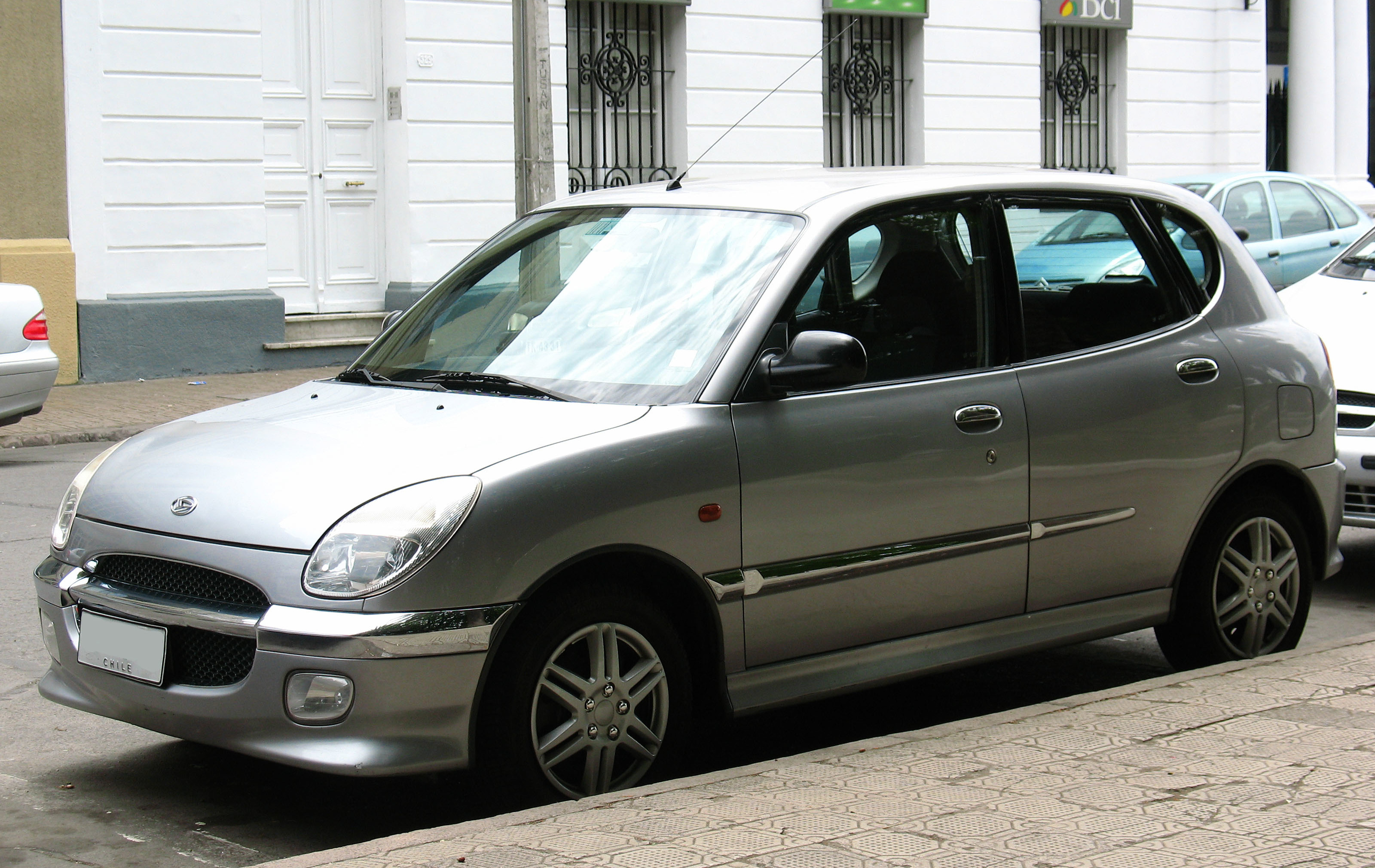
2001 Sirion 1.3 (pre-facelift, Chile)

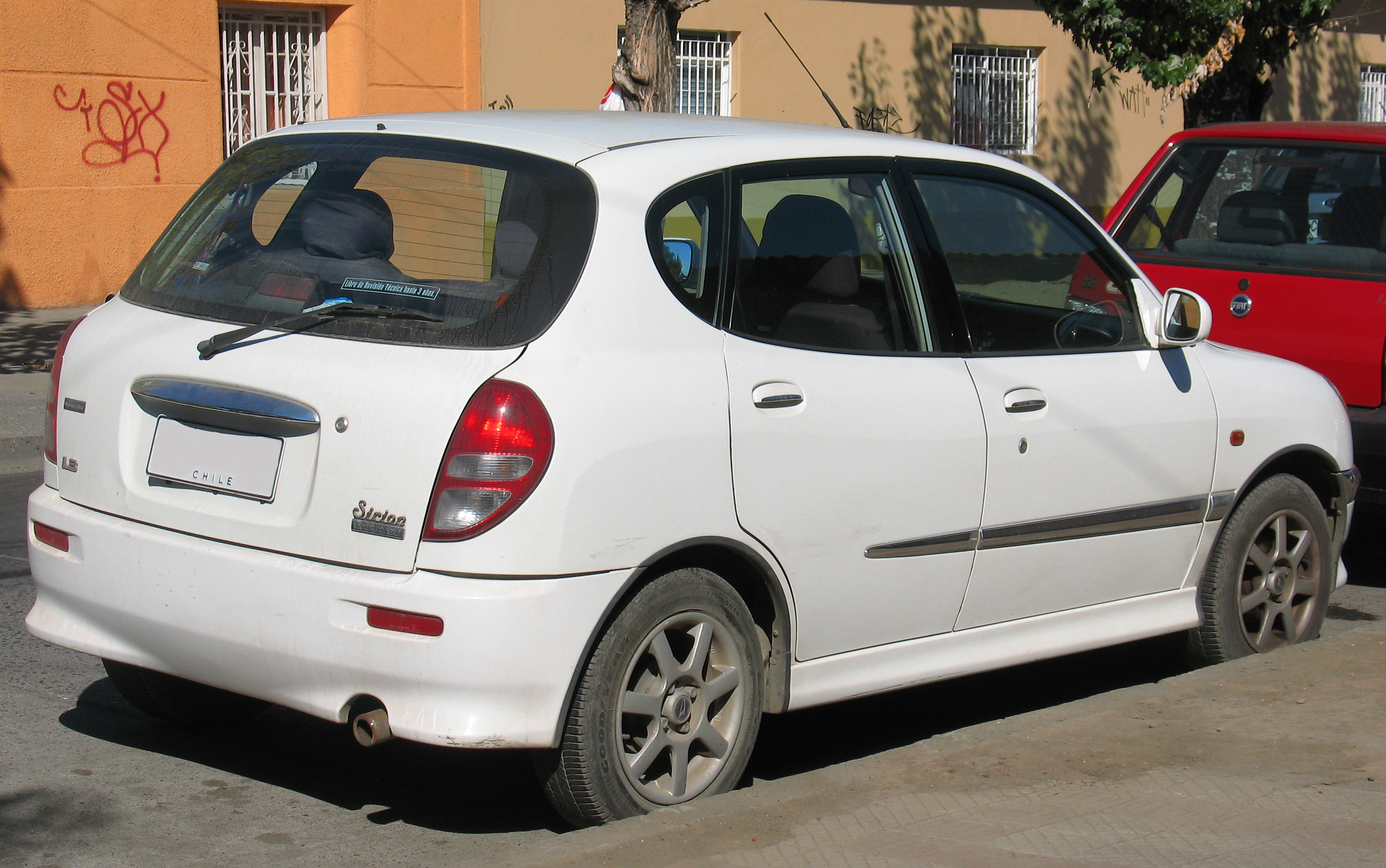
2003 Sirion 1.3 (pre-facelift, Chile)

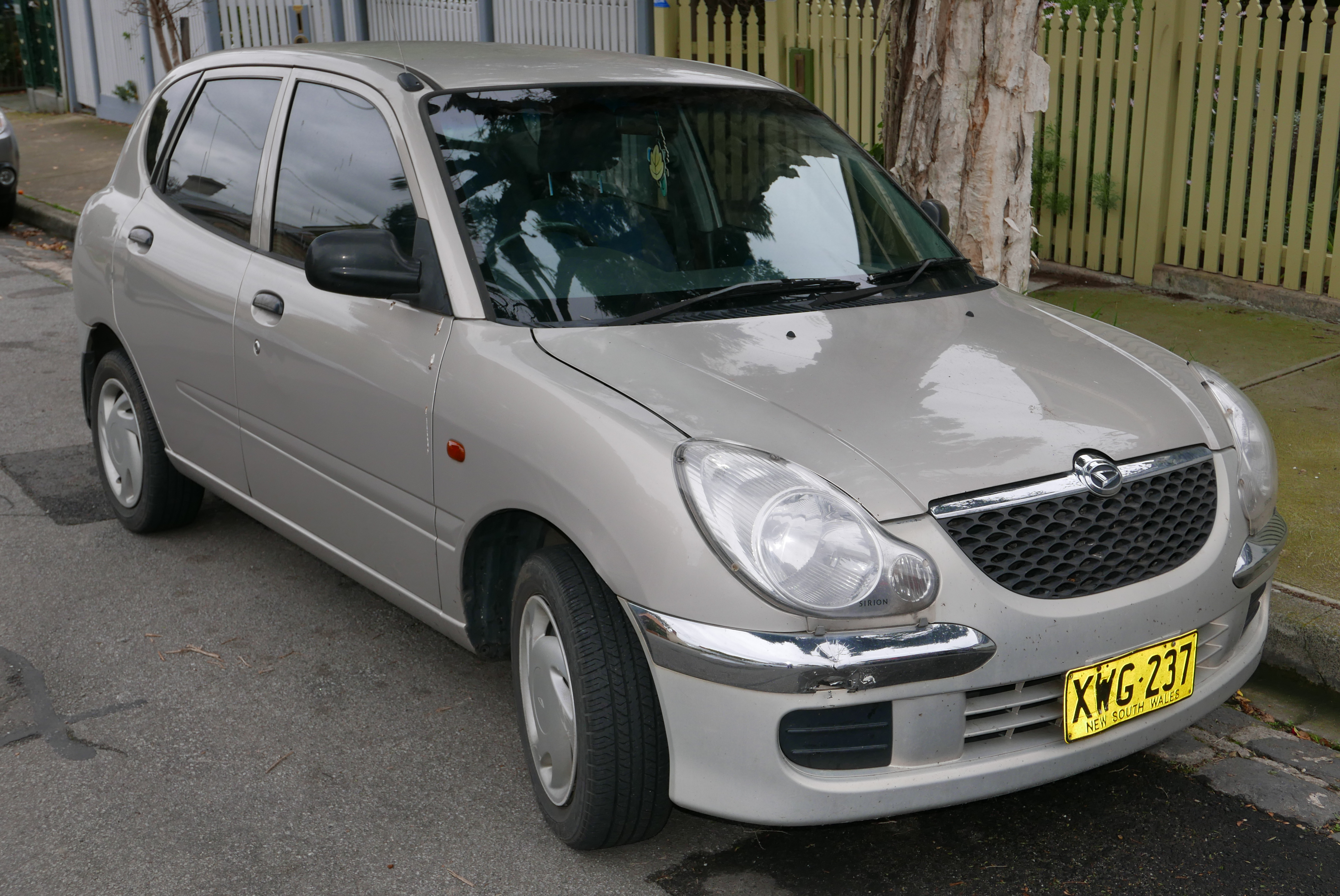
2002 Sirion (M100RS; facelift, Australia)

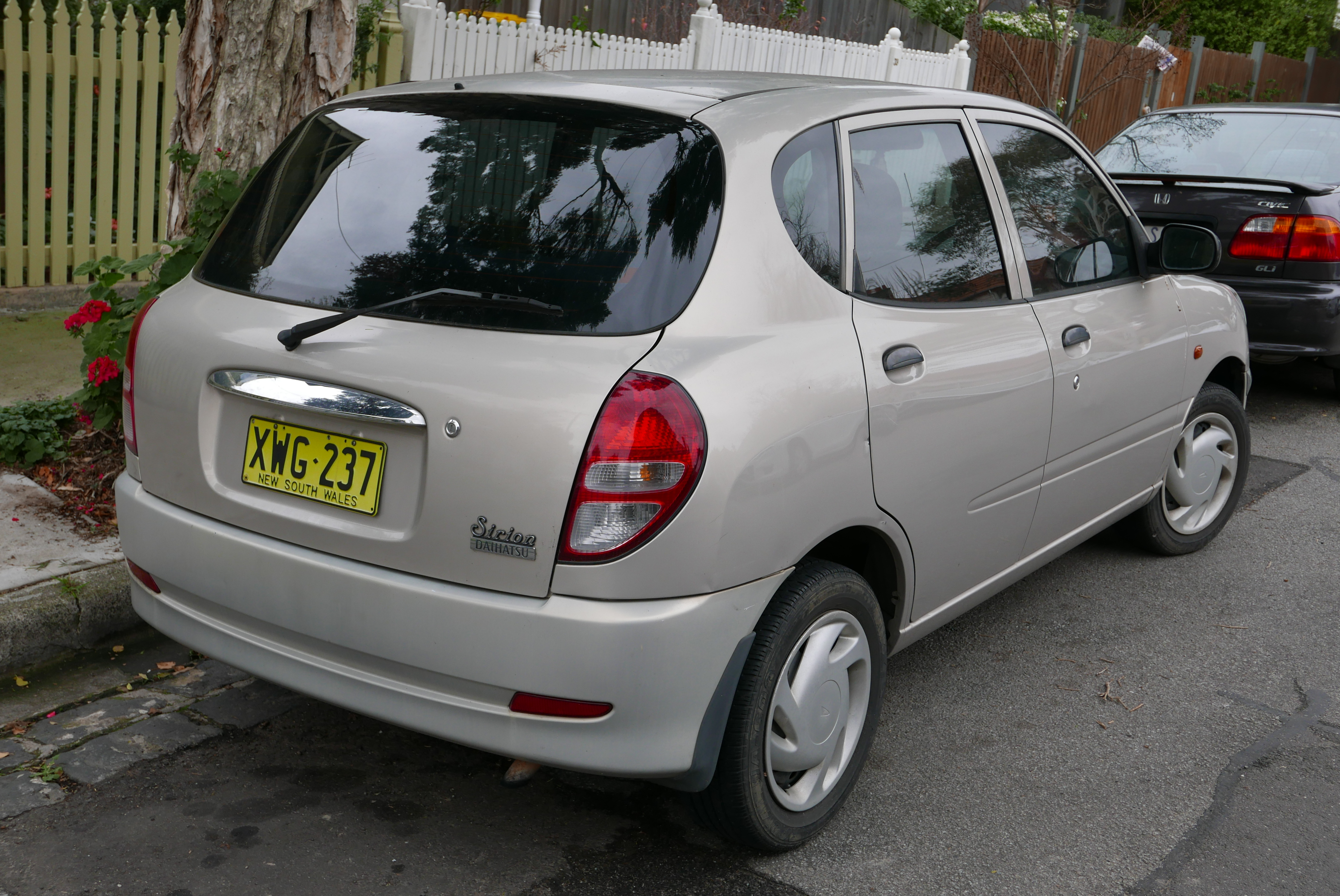
2002 Sirion (M100RS; facelift, Australia)

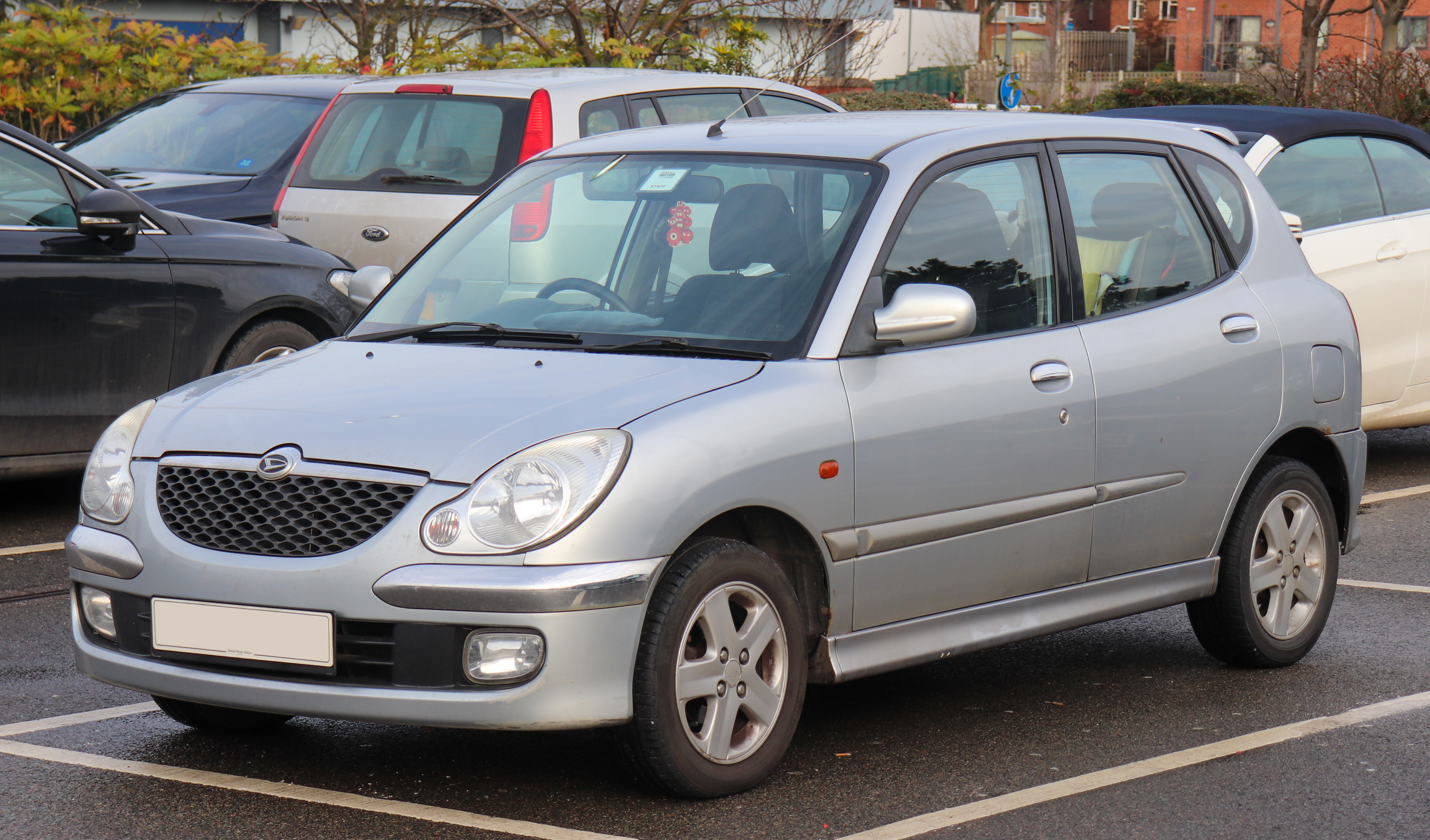
2003 Sirion F-Speed (M101RS; facelift, UK)

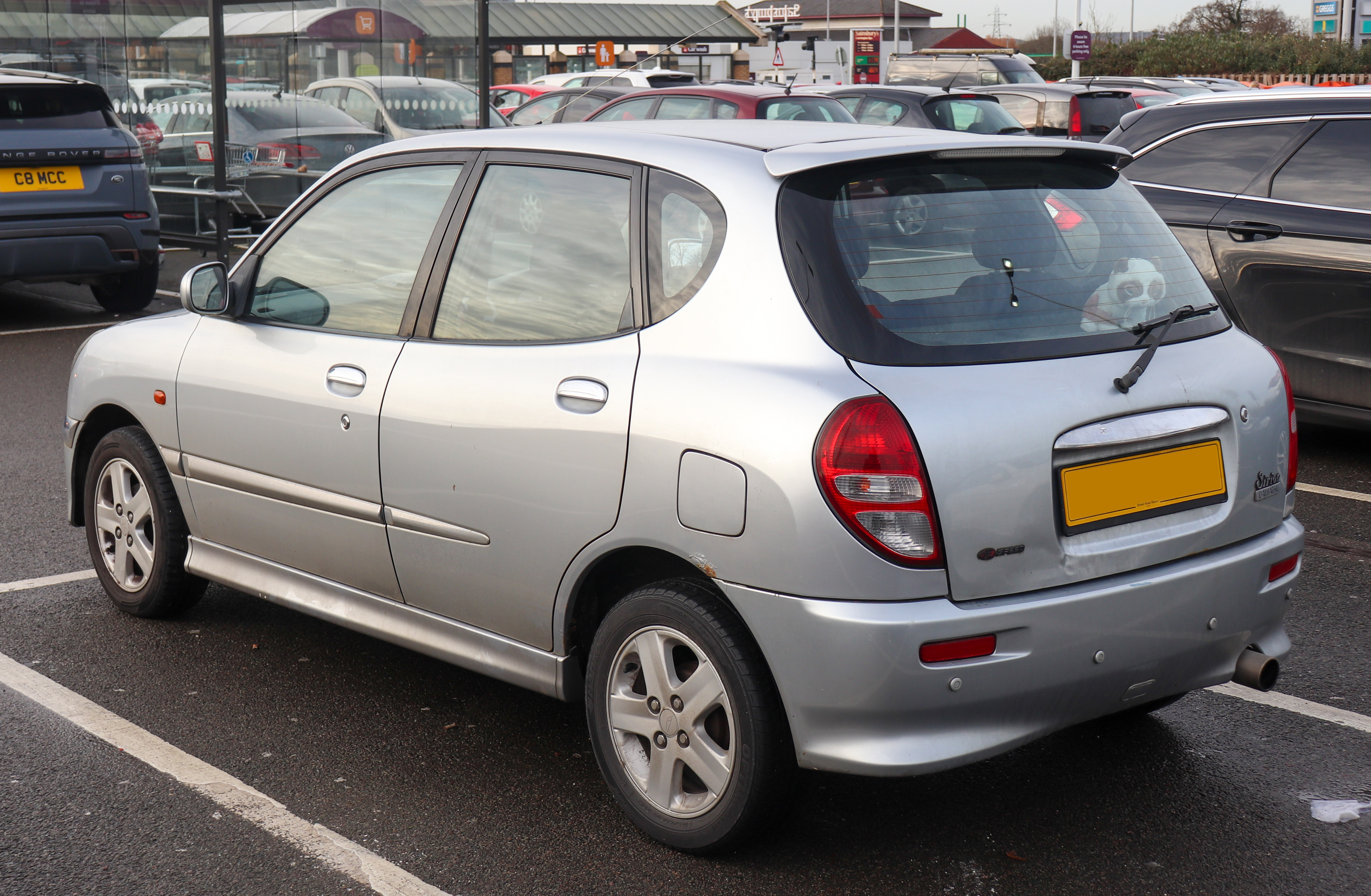
2003 Sirion F-Speed (M101RS; facelift, UK)

Duet

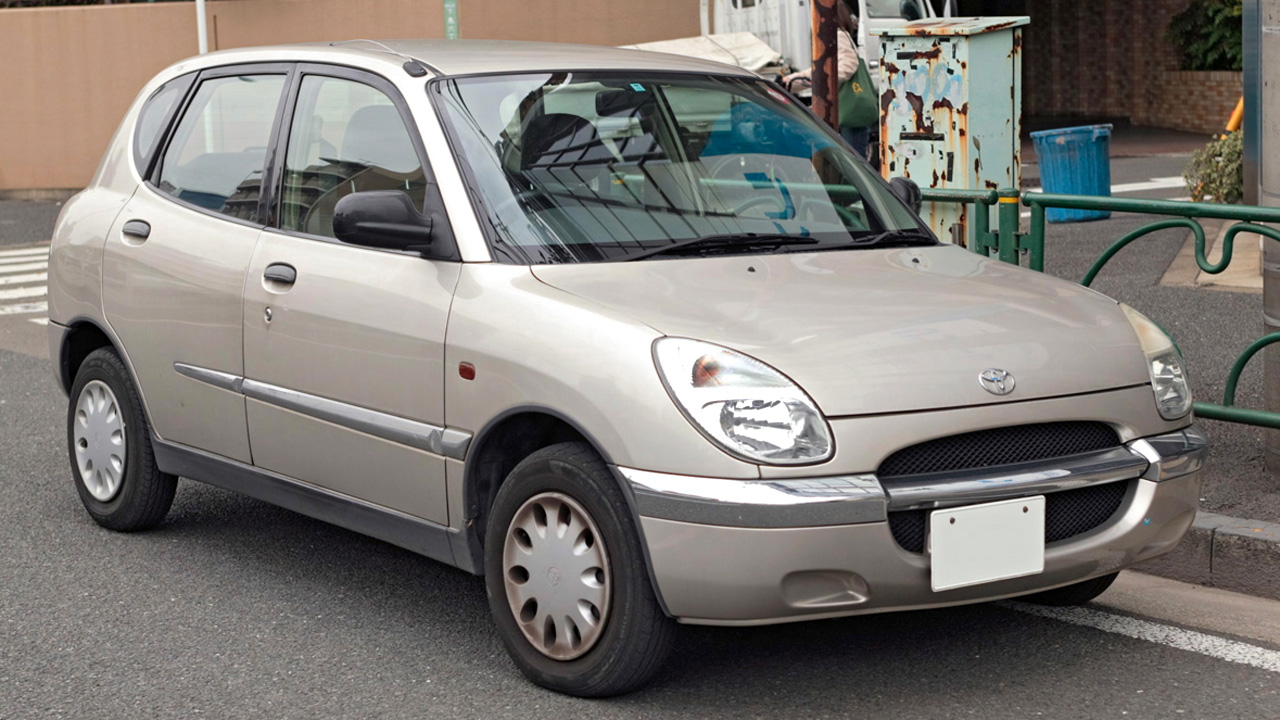
Toyota Duet 1.0 V (M100A; pre-facelift, Japan)

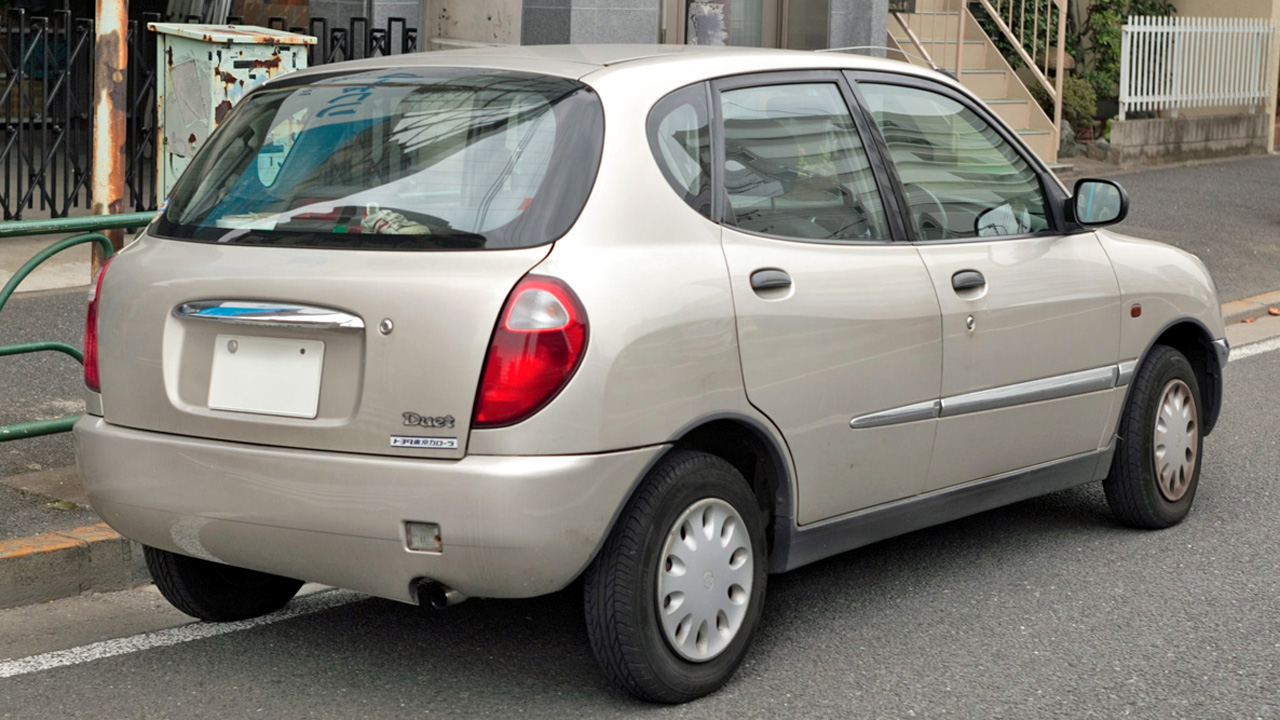
Duet 1.0 V (M100A; pre-facelift, Japan)

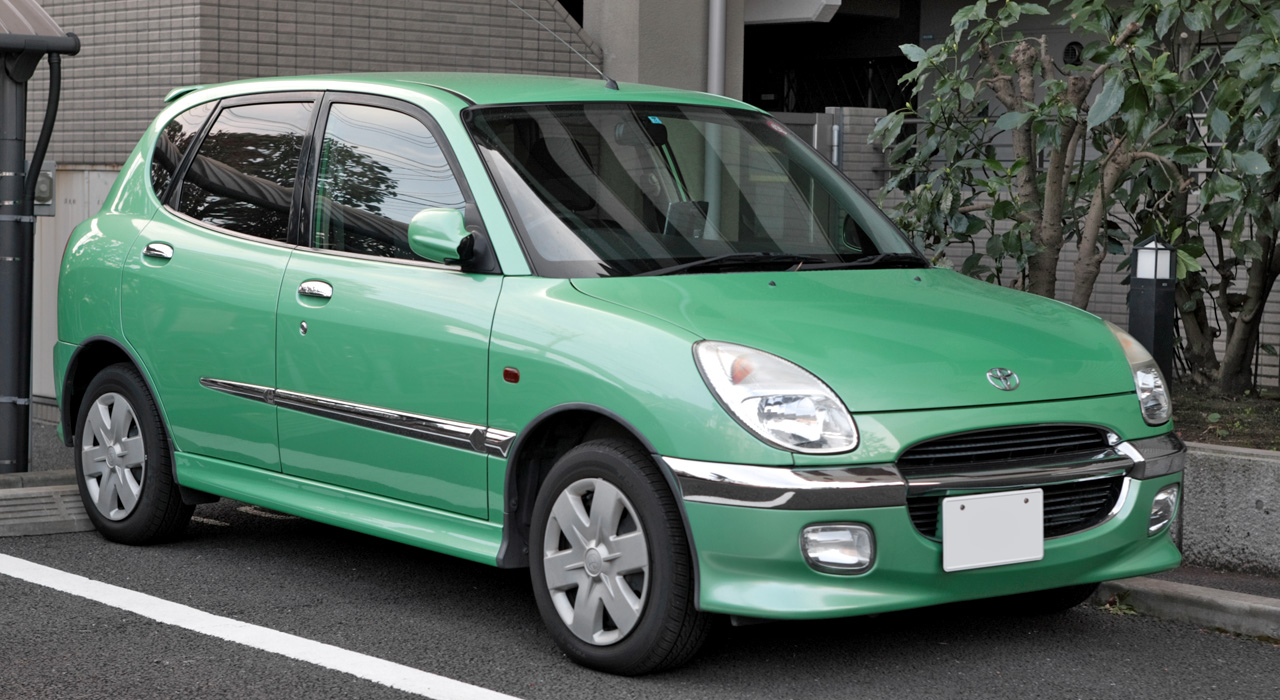
Duet 1.3 V Sports Package (M101A, Japan)

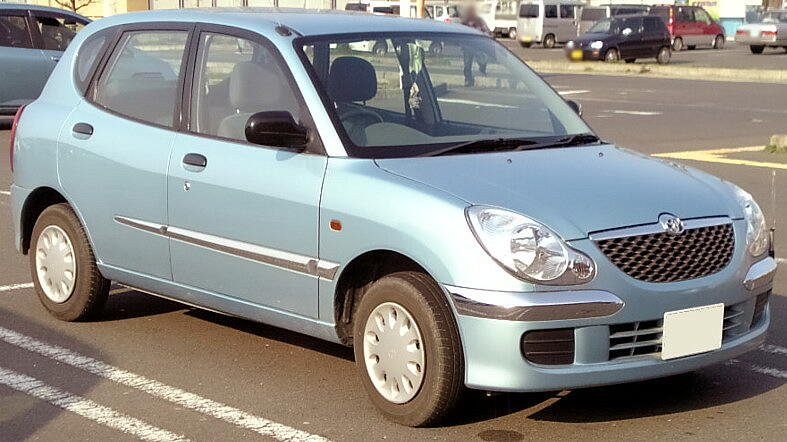
Duet 1.0 V (M100A; facelift, Japan)
