= Daihatsu J-series engine =

Daihatsu J engine
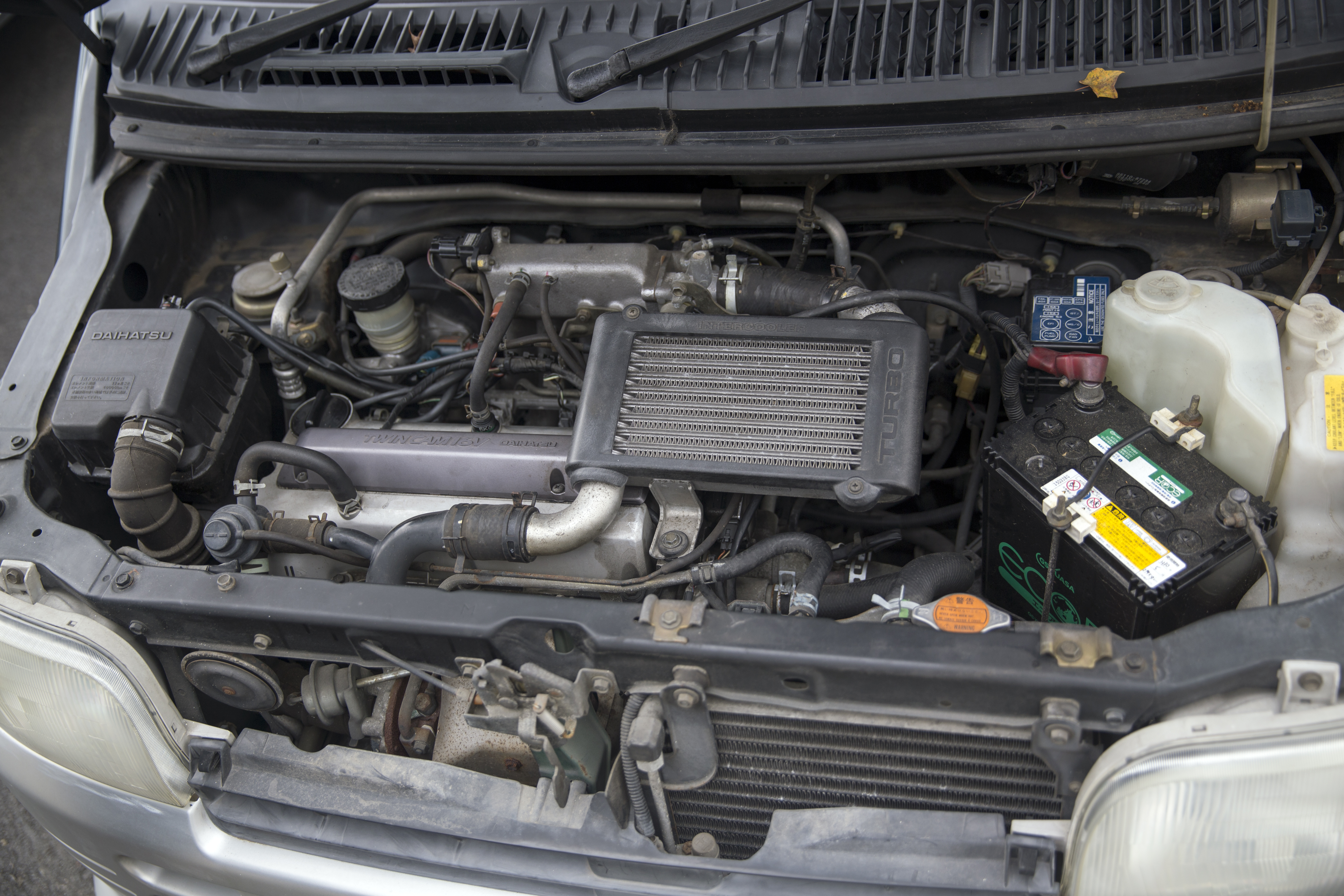
- JB-JL engine in Daihatsu Move (L602)

Overview
- Manufacturer: Daihatsu
- Production: 1994–2012

Layout
- Configuration: Inline-4 cylinder
- Displacement: 659 cc 713 cc
- Cylinder bore: 61.0 mm (2.40 in)
- Piston stroke: 56.4 mm (2.22 in); 61.0 mm (2.40 in)
- Cylinder block material: Aluminium alloy
- Cylinder head material: Aluminium alloy
- Valvetrain: DOHC 16-valve
- Compression ratio: 8.0–10.0:1

Combustion
- Fuel system: Fuel injection
- Fuel type: Petrol
- Cooling system: Water-cooled

Output
- Power output: 58–120 PS (43–88 kW; 57–118 hp)
- Torque output: 57–128 N⋅m (6–13 kg⋅m; 42–94 lb⋅ft)

Chronology
- Successor: Daihatsu EF engine

Based on the Japanese Wikipedia article

The Daihatsu J-series engine is a series of the inline-four engines specially for Daihatsu's kei cars that was produced from August 1994 to August 2012. This was the only inline-four engine for Daihatsu's kei cars, debuted in the L502 Daihatsu Mira that was launched in September 1994.

It features smooth engine rotation, low noise, less vibration and quite powerful power in its class (turbo version). But since the stroke is short and volume per cylinder is small (164.75 cc) compared to the inline-three engine (±220 cc, which is common for kei cars), the torque characteristics and fuel consumption in the lower rpm is not that great compared to inline-three engine. For this reason, it can be said that the engine is more specialized for sport driving rather than "stop and go city driving".

On 31 August 2012, as the production of the first Daihatsu Copen ended, the production of the J-series engine ended as well. Daihatsu has announced that it will integrate the engine for kei cars into inline-three in the future (EF engine).

== Design ==
The specification is water-cooled inline-four cylinder DOHC 16-valve EFI, the bore and stroke size is 61.0 mm x 56.4 mm, which made 659 cc of displacement. The camshaft was driven by a timing chain, which is very rare for a kei car at that time.

Based on the turbocharged JB-JL engine, the JC-DET engine that powered the M112S Daihatsu Storia X4 had its displacement increased to 713 cc by lengthening the stroke to 61.0 mm, making it a square engine (61.0 mm x 61.0 mm). Combined with the "turbo factor" multiplier of 1.4, this engine was perfectly suited for Japan's sub-1 liter rally class, being classified as .

A "2" as a third digit of the car's model number (xx2) usually indicates that it is powered with J-series engine (excepting the Daihatsu Copen), for example: L502 Daihatsu Mira or L902 Daihatsu Move.

Specifications:

=== JB-EL ===
659 cc inline-four DOHC 16-valve water-cooled EFI, the bore and stroke size is 61.0 mm x 56.4 mm. Naturally aspirated, the compression ratio is 10.0. Maximum output is 58 PS (43 kW; 57 hp) at 7,600 rpm and maximum torque is 57 N⋅m (42 lb⋅ft) at 5,600 rpm.

Application:

- L502 Daihatsu Mira

=== JB-JL ===
659 cc inline-four DOHC 16-valve water-cooled EFI, the bore and stroke size is 61.0 mm x 56.4 mm. Turbo with intercooler, compression ratio 8.7. Maximum output is 64 PS (47 kW; 63 hp) at 7,500 rpm and maximum torque is 100 N⋅m (74 lb⋅ft) at 4,000 rpm.

Applications:

- L502/512S Daihatsu Mira
- L602S Daihatsu Move

=== JB-DET ===
659 cc inline-four DOHC 16-valve water-cooled EFI, the bore and stroke size is 61.0 mm x 56.4 mm. Turbo with intercooler, the compression ratio is 8.2. Maximum output is 64 PS (47 kW; 63 hp) at 6,000 rpm and maximum torque is 100–107 N⋅m (74–79 lb⋅ft) at 3,200-3,600 rpm.

Applications:

- L152S Daihatsu Move
- L802S Daihatsu Opti
- L902/912S Daihatsu Move
- L952/962S Daihatsu Max

=== JB-DET (twin-scroll) ===
659 cc inline-four DOHC 16-valve water-cooled EFI, the bore and stroke size is 61.0 mm x 56.4 mm. Twin-scroll turbo with intercooler, the compression ratio is 8.2. Maximum output is 64 PS (47 kW; 63 hp) at 6,000 rpm and maximum torque is 110 N⋅m (81 lb⋅ft) at 3,200 rpm.

Application:

- L800K Daihatsu Copen

=== JC-DET ===
713 cc inline-four DOHC 16-valve water-cooled EFI, the bore and stroke size is 61.0 mm x 61.0 mm. Turbo with intercooler, compression ratio 8.0. Maximum output is 120 PS (88 kW; 118 hp) at 7,200 rpm and maximum torque is 128 N⋅m (94 lb⋅ft) at 4,800 rpm.

Applications:

- M112S Daihatsu Storia X4

== See also ==
- List of Daihatsu engines
