= Daihatsu Sirion =

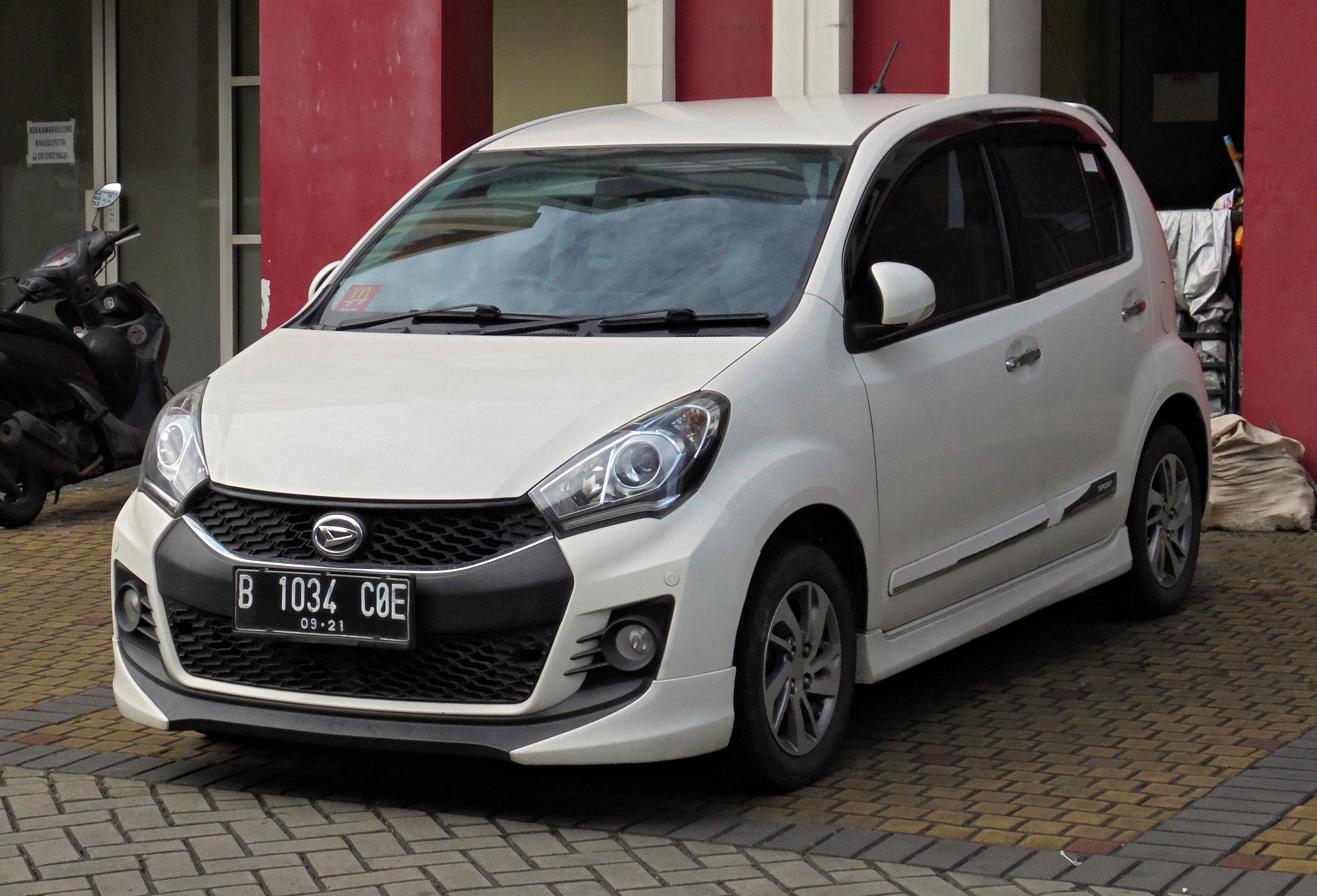

Overview
- Manufacturer: Daihatsu (1998–2015); Perodua (2007–present)
- Also called: Daihatsu Storia (1998–2004); Daihatsu Boon (2004–2015); Toyota Duet (1998–2004); Toyota Passo (2004–2015); Subaru Justy (2007–2011); Perodua Myvi (2007–present)
- Production: June 1998 – present

Body and chassis
- Class: Subcompact car/Supermini
- Body style: 5-door hatchback
- Layout: Front-engine, front-wheel-drive; Front-engine, four-wheel-drive (1998–2013)

Chronology
- Predecessor: Daihatsu Charade

The Daihatsu Sirion is a subcompact/supermini hatchback produced by the Japanese automobile manufacturer Daihatsu since 1998. The Sirion nameplate was first used on export versions of the Japanese market Storia (between 1998 and 2004) and Boon (between 2004 and 2015). There are 2 models of the 1998-2004 Sirion, the M100 (three-cylinder 998cc) and the M101 (4 cylinder 1.3L) model. Both M100 and M101 were available in manual or automatic transmissions.

Since 2007, the nameplate has also been used in Indonesia for the Malaysian-built Perodua Myvi, which in its first two generations were redesigned versions of the first and second-generation Boon, while the third generation is a fully independent model developed in-house by Perodua with technical support from Daihatsu.

International

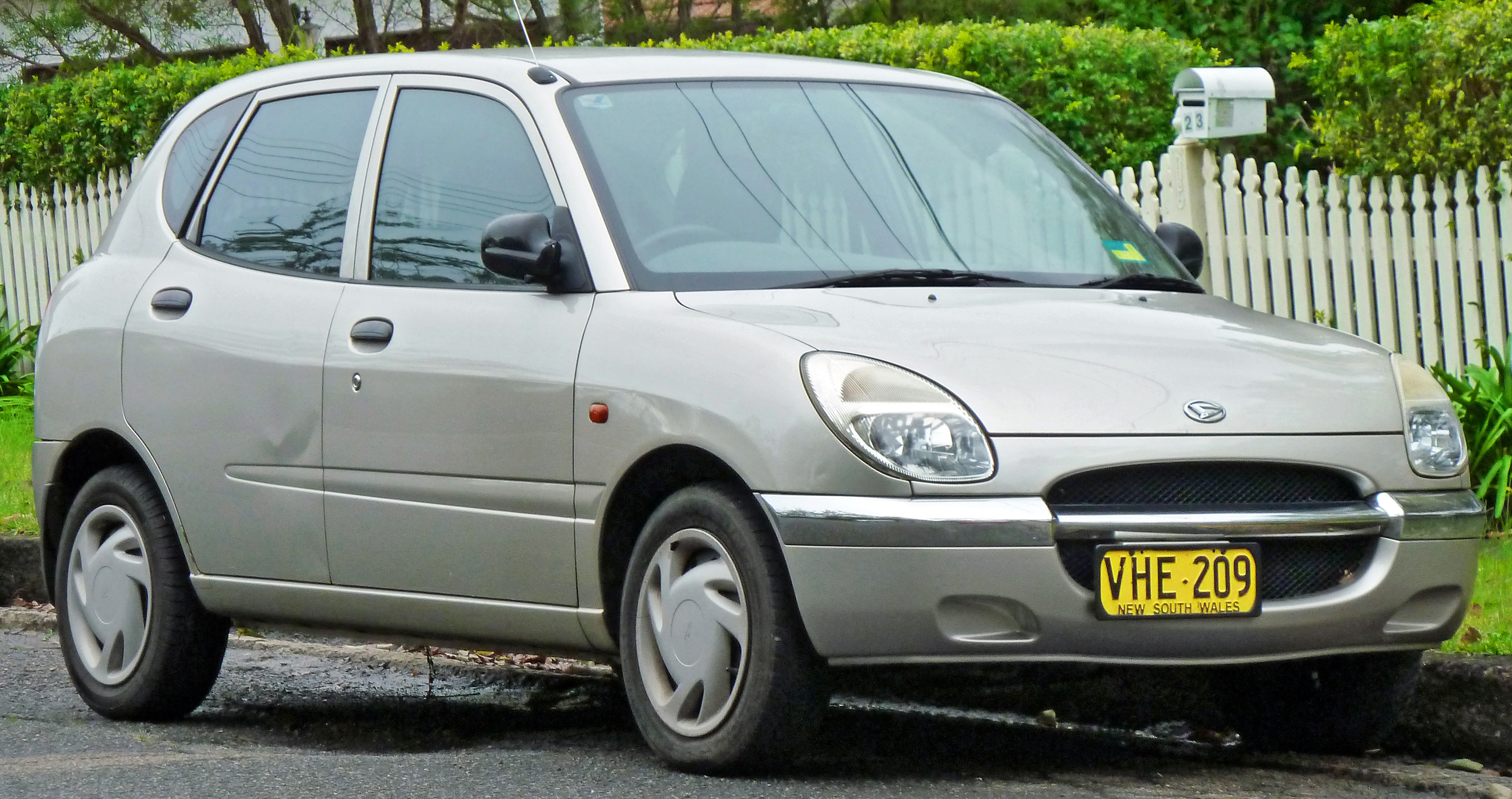
First generation (M100): 1998–2004

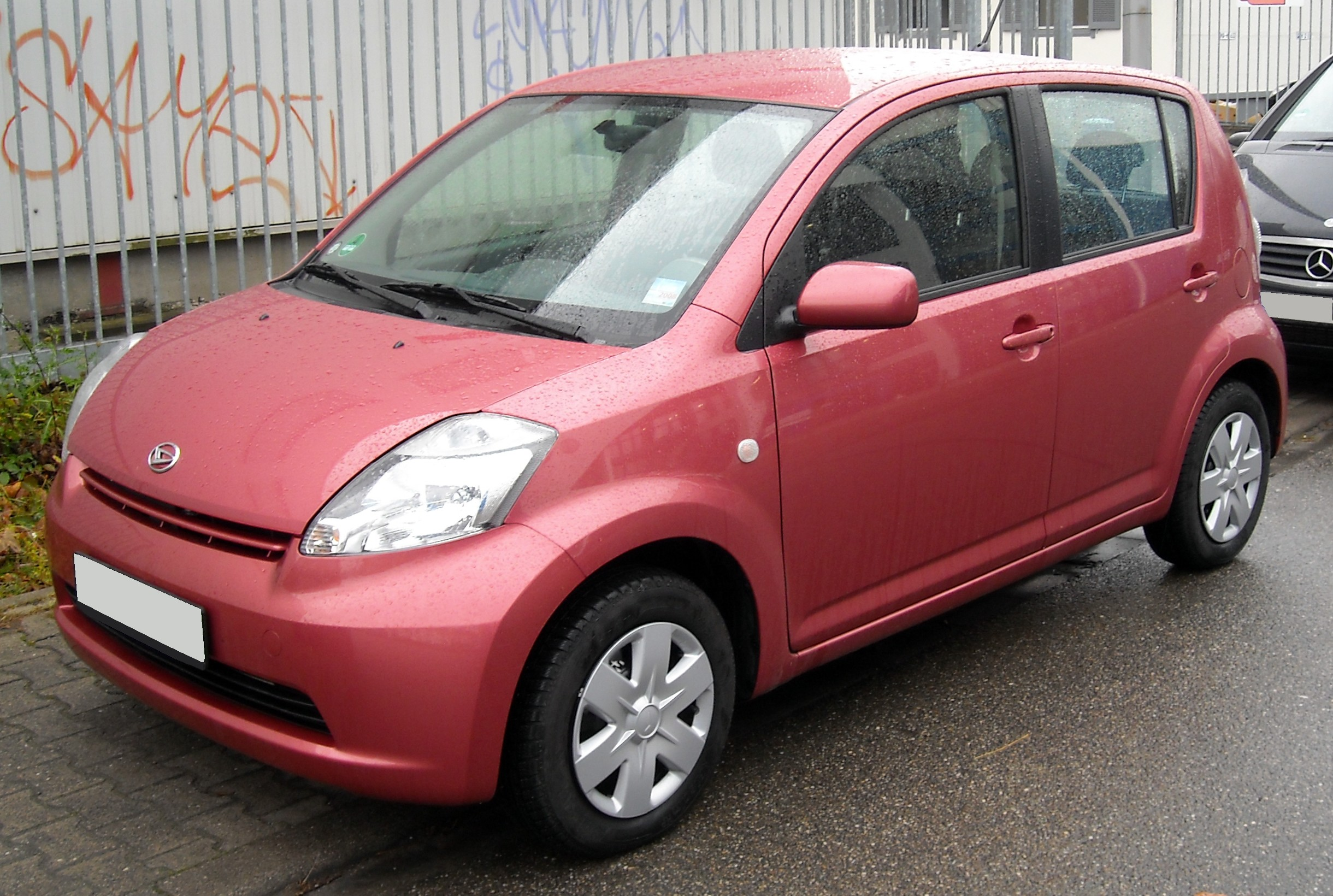
Second generation (M300): 2004–2015

Indonesia

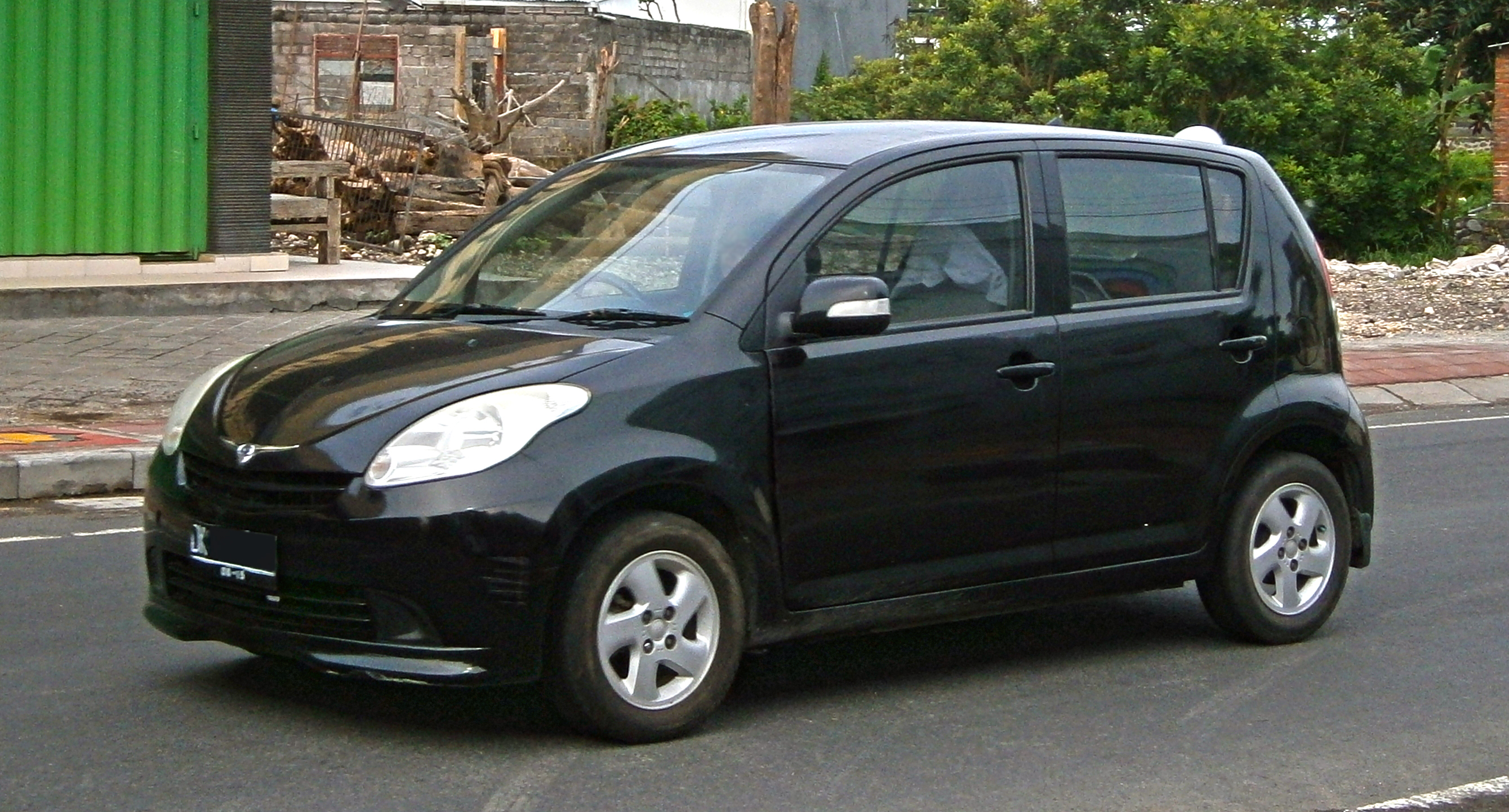
First generation (M300): 2007–2011

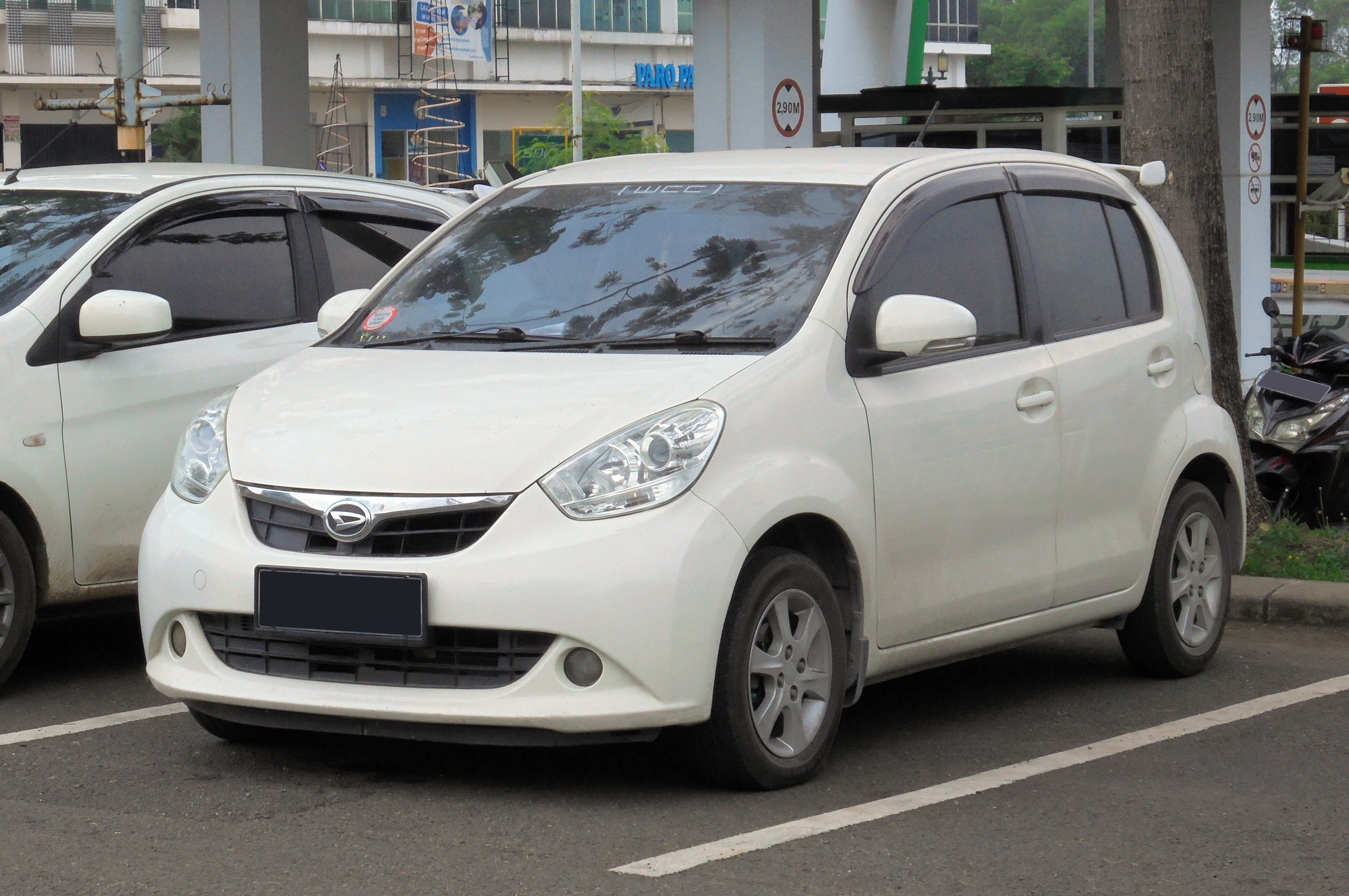
Second generation (M600): 2011–2018

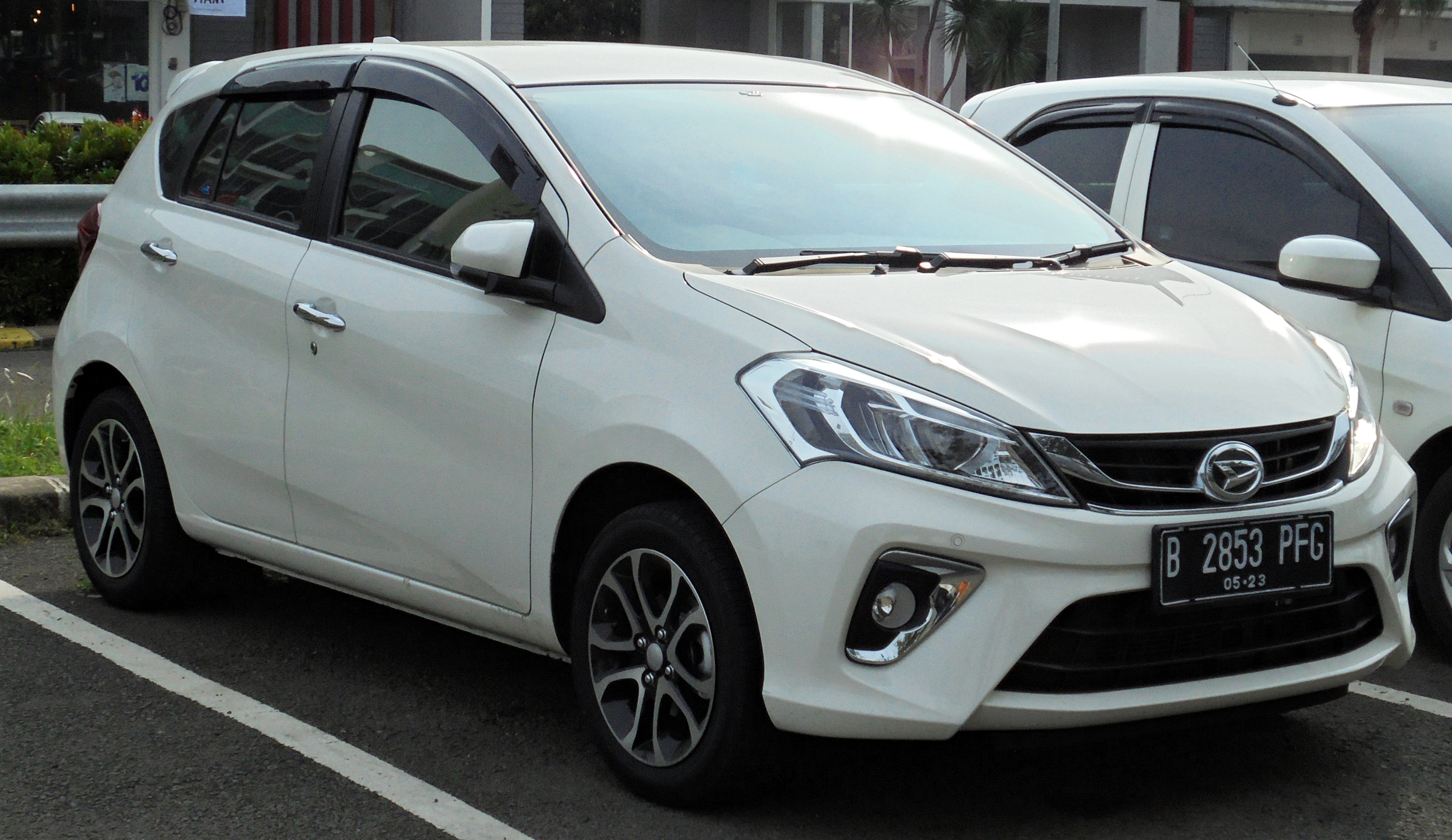
Third generation (M800): 2018–present
