= Daihatsu Move =

Kei car/city car

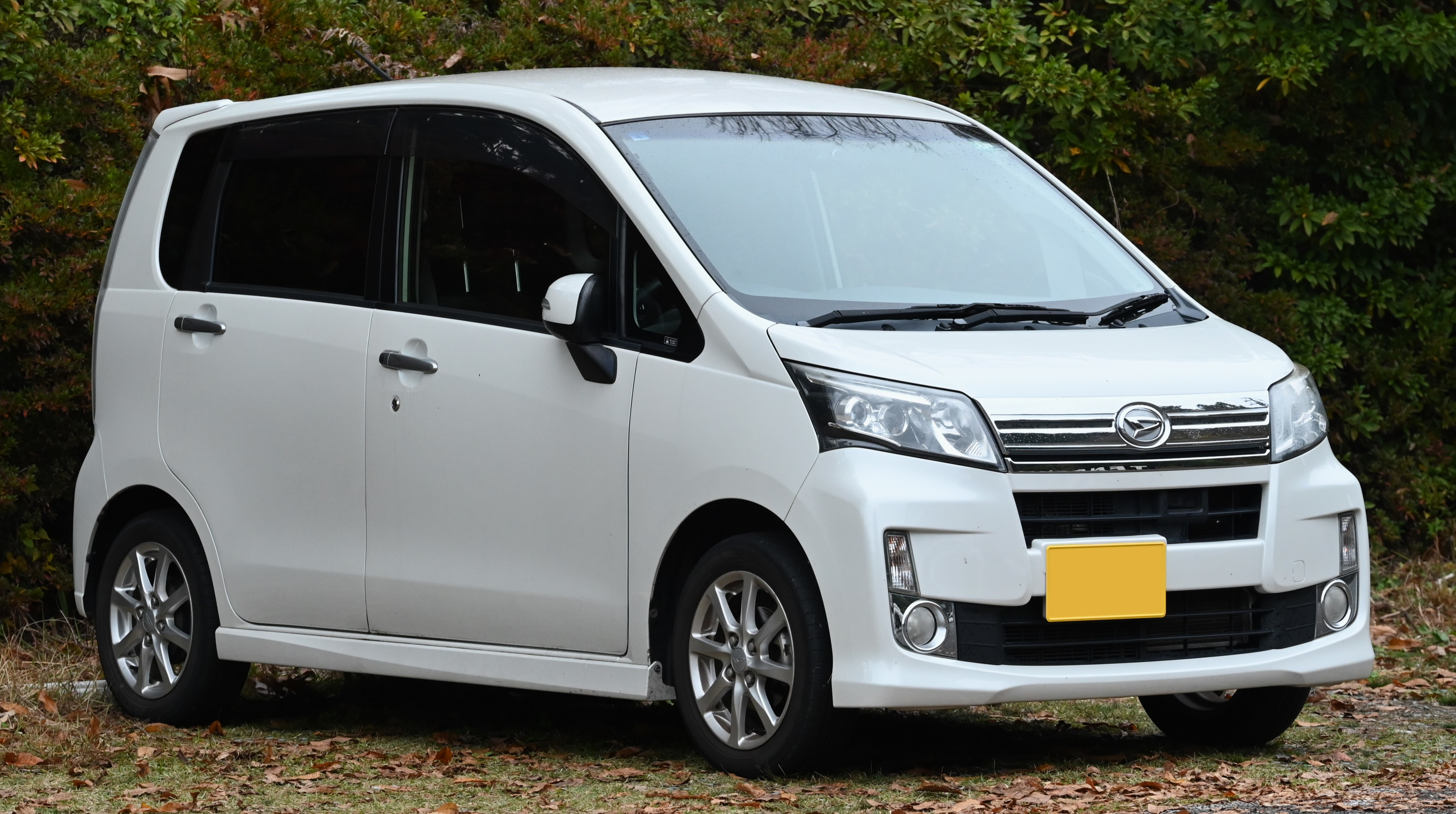
- Daihatsu Move Custom (LA100S)

Overview
- Manufacturer: Daihatsu
- Also called: Subaru Stella (2010–present); Perodua Kenari (Malaysia, 2000–2009)
- Production: August 1995 – June 2023; June 2025–present

Body and chassis
- Class: Kei car; City car (export models)
- Body style: 5-door hatchback (1995–2023); 5-door microvan (2025–present)
- Layout: Front-engine, front-wheel-drive; Front-engine, four-wheel-drive

The Daihatsu Move (Japanese: ダイハツ・ムーヴ, Hepburn: Daihatsu Mūvu) is a kei car/city car manufactured by the Japanese automaker Daihatsu between 1995 and 2023, and was reintroduced in 2025. The Move is Daihatsu's response to the similarly designed Suzuki Wagon R that was introduced two years earlier in 1993. The first Move was designed by Italian design house I.DE.A Institute and succeeding generations continued to build upon the original design. The Move is built upon the chassis of the Mira but with a taller body.

== First generation (L600; 1995) ==
First generation
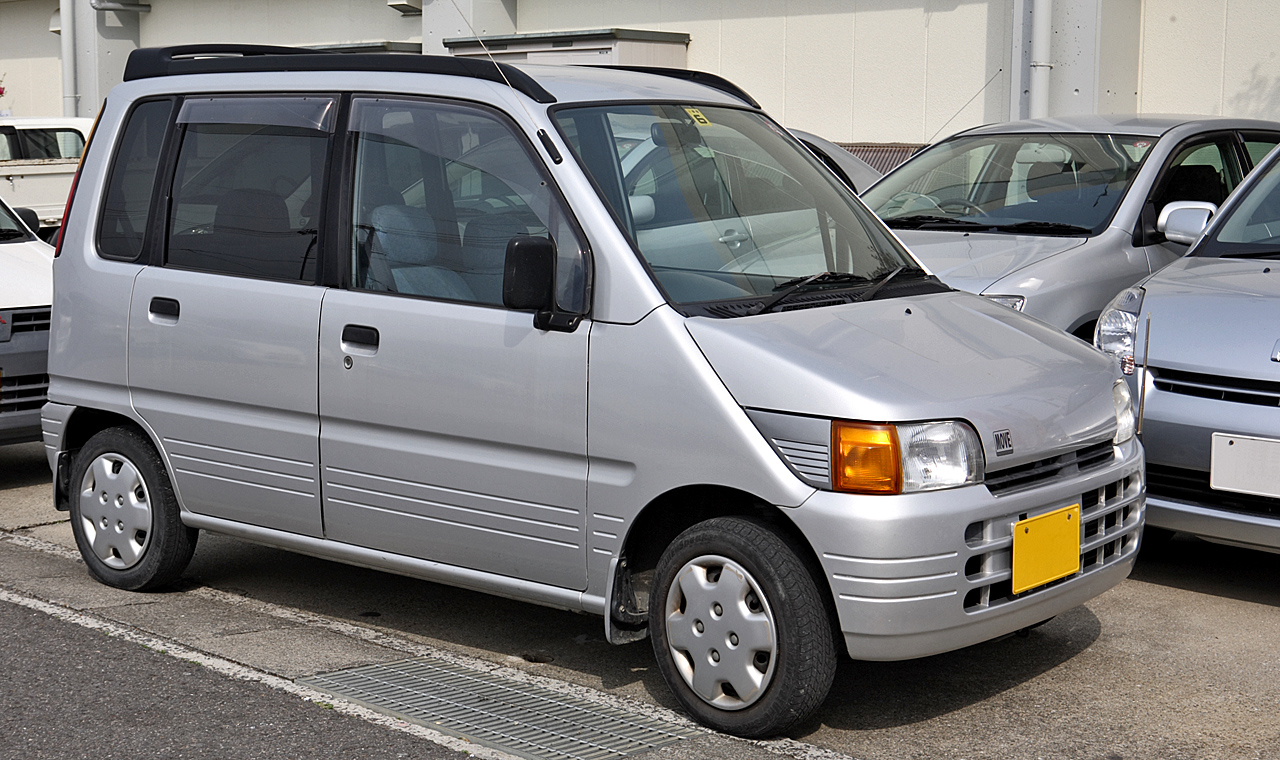
- Daihatsu Move (L600S)

Overview
- Model code: L600
- Production: August 1995 – October 1998
- Designer: Justyn Norek at I.DE.A Institute

Body and chassis
- Body style: 5-door hatchback
- Related: Daihatsu Mira (L500)

Powertrain
- Engine: Petrol: 659 cc EF-GL/ZL DOHC I3 (L600/610); 659 cc EF-RL DOHC turbo I3 (L600/610); 659 cc JB-JL DOHC turbo I4 (L602); 847 cc ED-20 I3 (L601; export only)
- Transmission: 5-speed manual; 3-speed automatic; 4-speed automatic

Dimensions
- Wheelbase: 2,300 mm (90.6 in)
- Length: 3,295 mm (129.7 in)
- Width: 1,395 mm (54.9 in)
- Height: 1,620 mm (63.8 in)
- Kerb weight: 690–800 kg (1,521–1,764 lb)

The first-generation Move was designed by I.DE.A in Turin, Italy. It was marketed with a 659 cc three-cylinder engine in Japan and with an 847 cc (51.7 cu in) ED-20 engine in export markets. The Japanese domestic market models were internally designated L600, or L610 when equipped with four-wheel drive system; export models were internally designated L601.

The Move was also offered with the turbocharged 659 cc JB-JL all-aluminium four-cylinder engine producing 64 PS (47 kW; 63 hp) and using the internal designation L602; this version was available with front-wheel drive and four-wheel drive. This four-cylinder version was originally the only version of the Move which was available with a four-speed automatic transmission; in May 1996 this became available with the turbocharged three-cylinder engine and proceeded to gradually spread downwards through the grades. The export model's ED-20 engine produced 44 PS (32 kW; 43 hp), offering more torque than the naturally aspirated 660 cc engines thanks to the larger displacement. The turbocharged engine was not offered in Europe due to its excessive emissions. The export model has a top speed of 130 km/h (81 mph), 125 km/h (78 mph) in the version with an automatic transmission.

In late 1997, a variant marketed as the Move Custom was introduced with larger headlamps and revised front styling, and was available in subsequent generations.

Daihatsu produced more than half a million L600/L610 Move models, mostly in Japan. It was imported to Europe, including the UK.

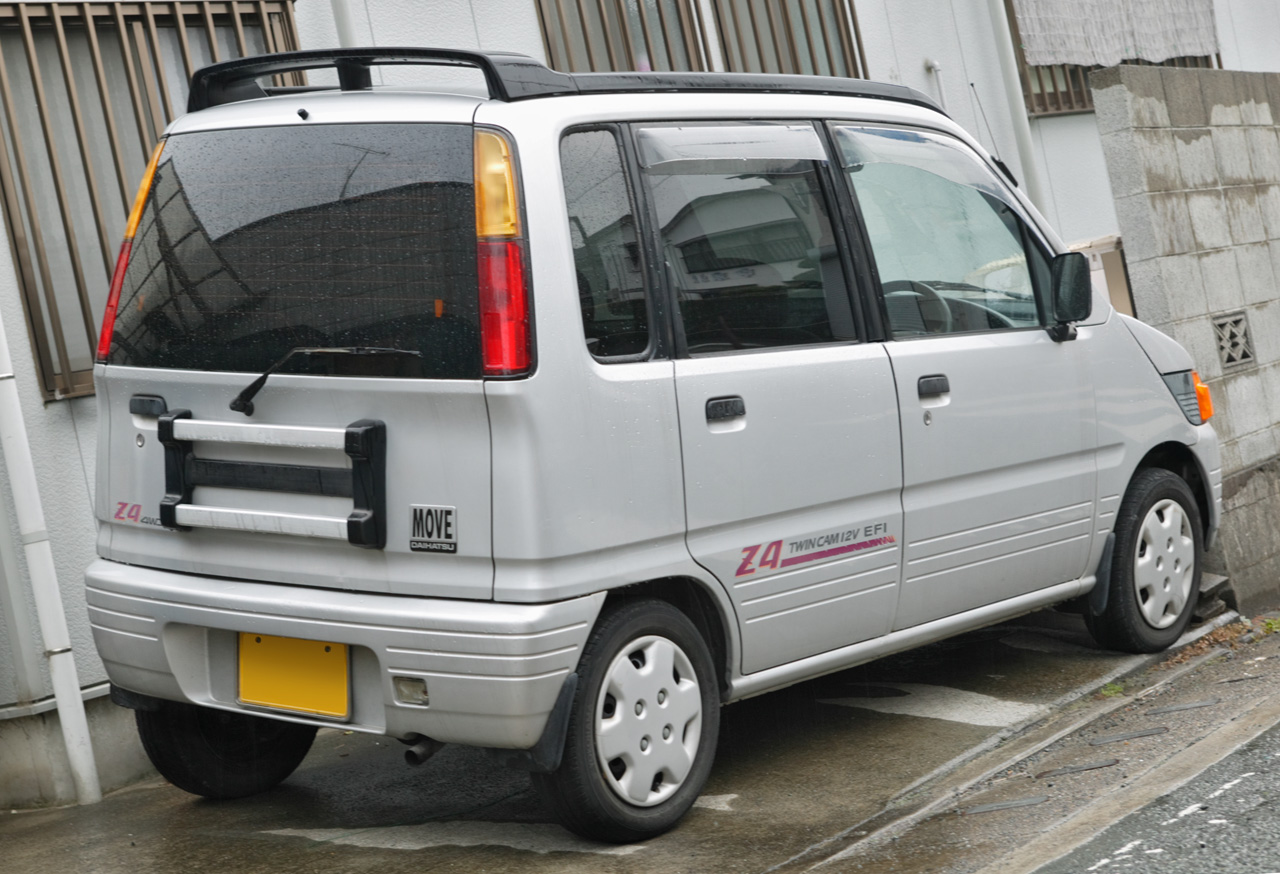
Daihatsu Move Z4 (L610S)

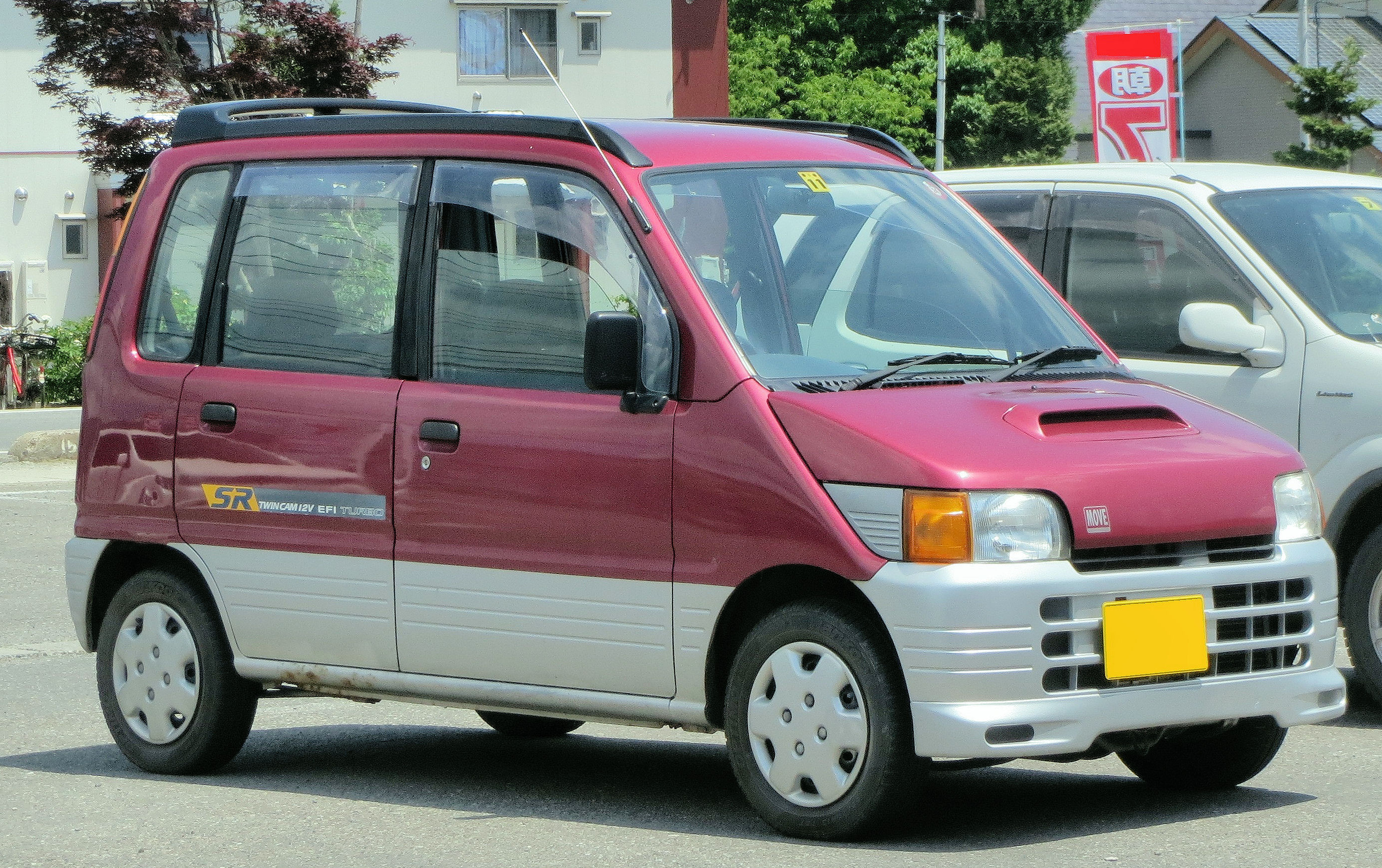
Daihatsu Move SR Turbo (L600S)

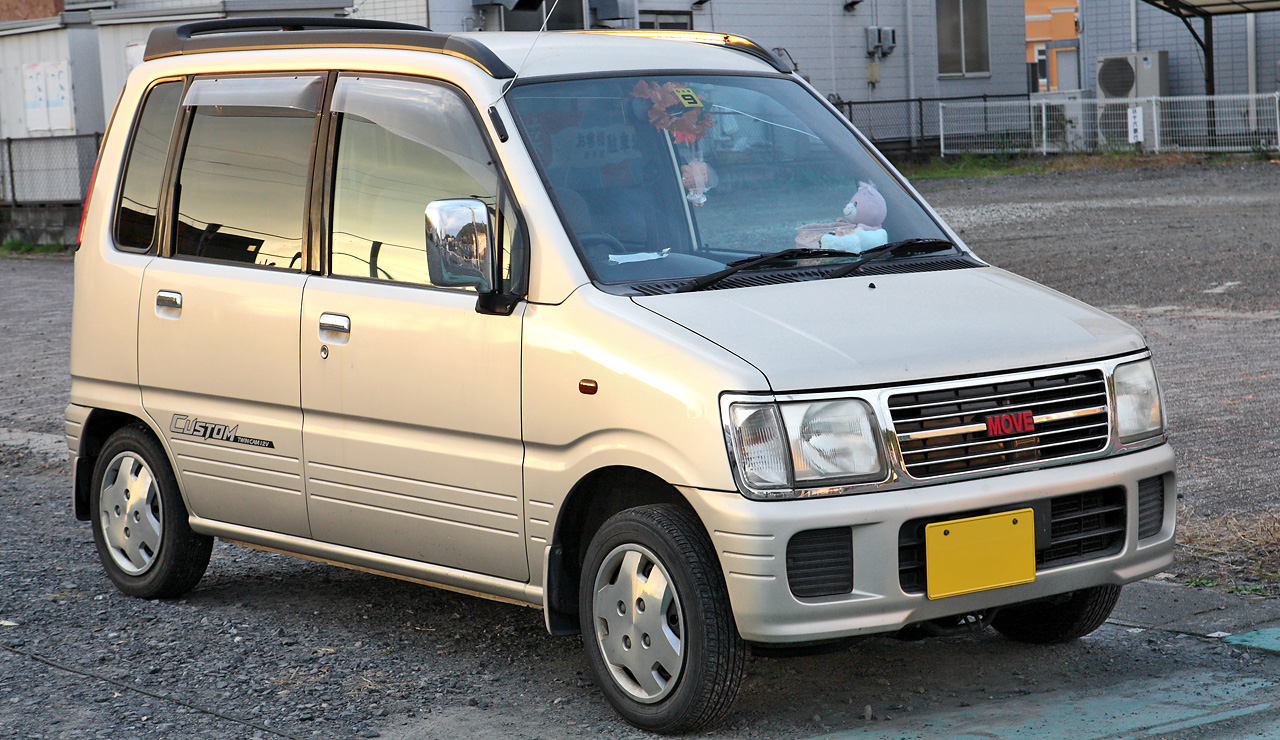
Daihatsu Move Custom (L600S)

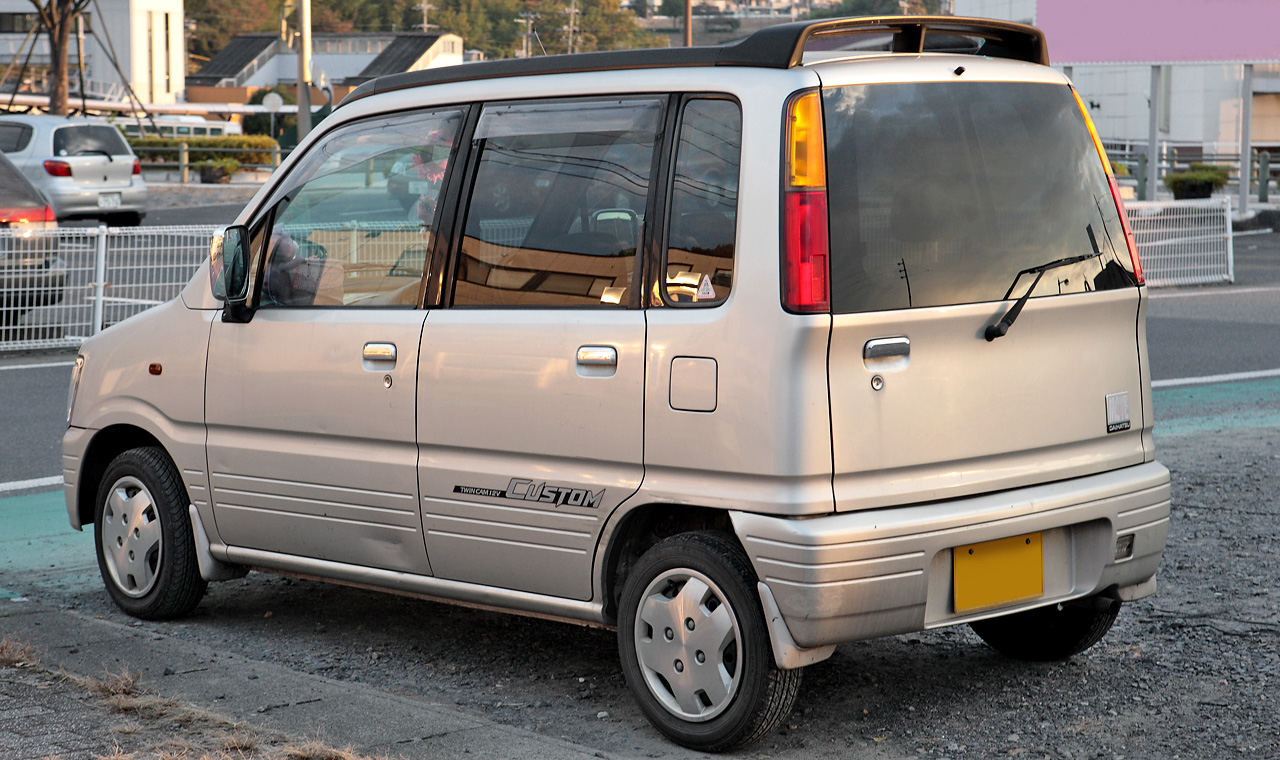
Daihatsu Move Custom (L600S)

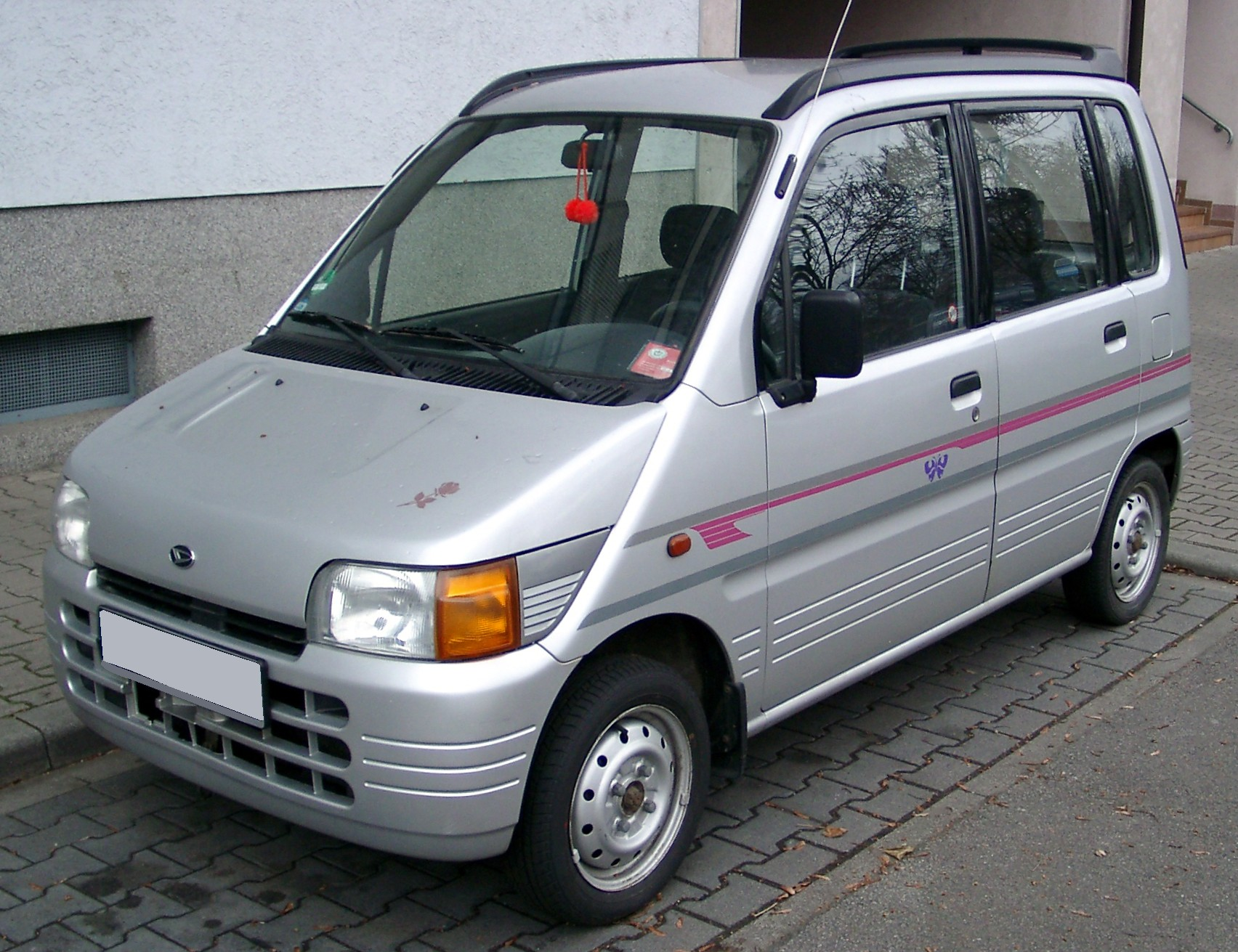
Export-model Daihatsu Move

== Second generation (L900; 1998) ==
Second generation
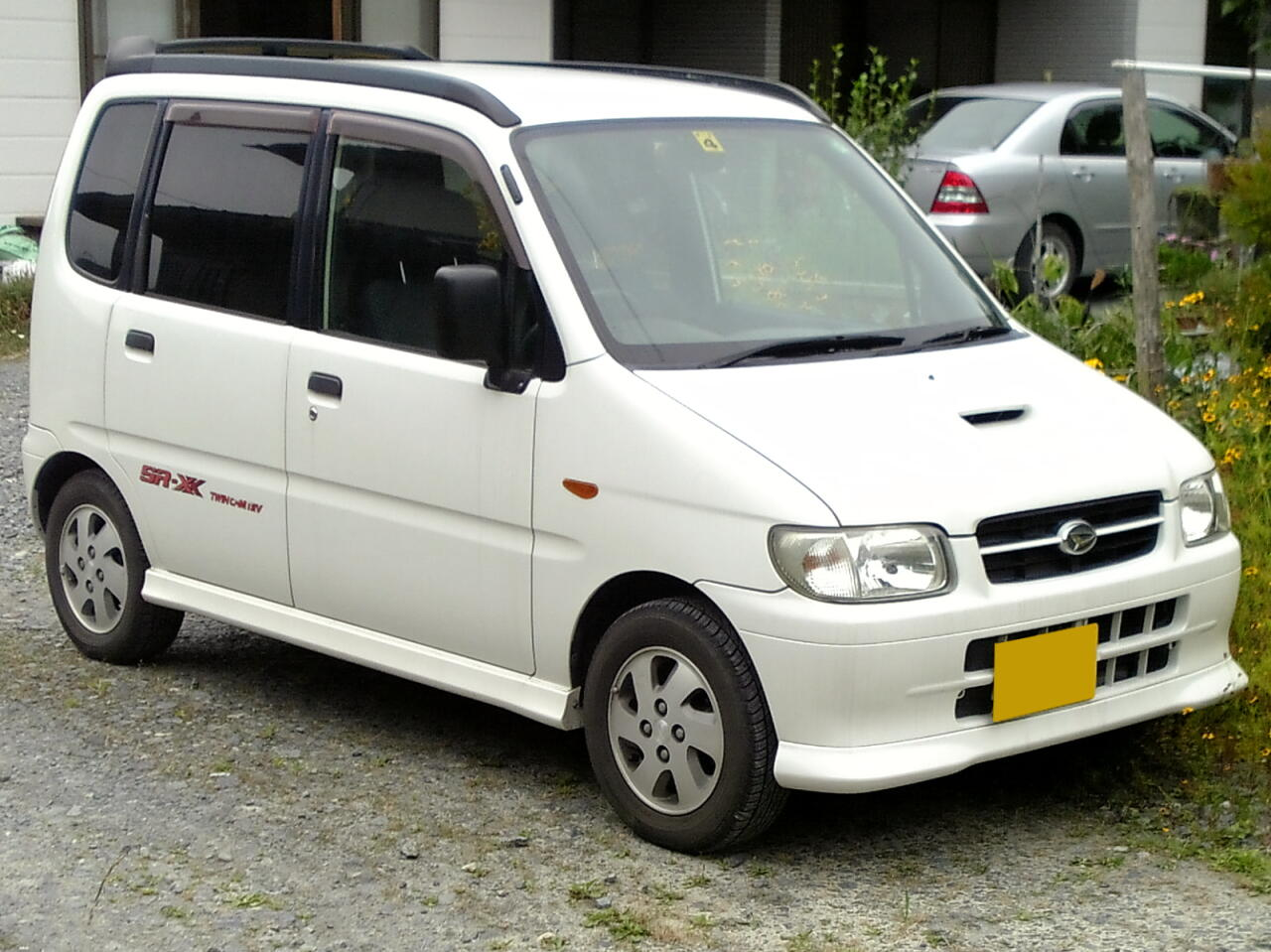
- 1998 Daihatsu Move SR-XX (L900S)

Overview
- Model code: L900
- Also called: Huali Happy Messenger (China, 2003–2008); Miles ZX40 (United States, 2006–2013); Perodua Kenari (Malaysia, 2000–2009)
- Production: 1998–2002 (Japan); 2003–2008 (Huali); 2006–2013 (Miles); 2000–2009 (Kenari)
- Designer: Italdesign Giugiaro

Body and chassis
- Body style: 5-door hatchback
- Related: Daihatsu Max (L950); Daihatsu Mira (L700)

Powertrain
- Engine: Petrol: 659 cc EF-SE I3; 659 cc EF-VE DOHC 12v I3; 659 cc EF-DET DOHC 12v turbo I3; 659 cc JB-DET DOHC 16v turbo I4
- Power output: 45 PS (33 kW; 44 hp) (EF-SE); 58 PS (43 kW; 57 hp) (EF-VE); 64 PS (47 kW; 63 hp) (EF-DET)
- Transmission: 5-speed manual; 3-speed automatic; 4-speed automatic; CVT

Dimensions
- Wheelbase: 2,360 mm (92.9 in)
- Length: 3,395 mm (133.7 in)
- Width: 1,475 mm (58.1 in)
- Height: 1,695 mm (66.7 in); 1,670 mm (65.7 in) (Custom); 1,650 mm (65.0 in) (Aero Down Custom)
- Kerb weight: 780–890 kg (1,720–1,962 lb)

The second-generation Move was introduced in October 1998. Power of the Japanese market engines are 45 PS (33 kW) for the basic EF-SE, 58 PS (43 kW) for the 12-valve EF-VE and 64 PS (47 kW) for the turbocharged EF-DET and JB-DET engines.

In May 1999 a Hello Kitty special edition, targeted at female drivers, was introduced. This was based on the CL model and was fitted with Hello Kitty emblems, decals, seat covers, and gauges. It also received a front bench seat, unlike other standard Moves, and the door lock knobs were shaped like the Sanrio character. A CVT option was added to the Move CX and Z4 models at the same time.

The second-generation Move received a minor facelift in October 2000. The Move models were divided into two models. The base model was called the Casual, while the sportier model was called the Custom. It featured a collision-safe body called "TAF" (Total Advanced Function), dual airbags for all models. Furthermore, the 2WD "Aero Down Custom" offered DVS (Daihatsu Vehicle Stability control system) as an option, which combined ABS, TCS, and yaw control. Other changes include a revised bumper (with additional vents at the front, redesigned marker lights at the rear) and redesigned single-piece taillights. The taillights on the Move Custom were also extended downward.

The second-generation Move was also marketed in Malaysia with slight modifications as the Perodua Kenari.

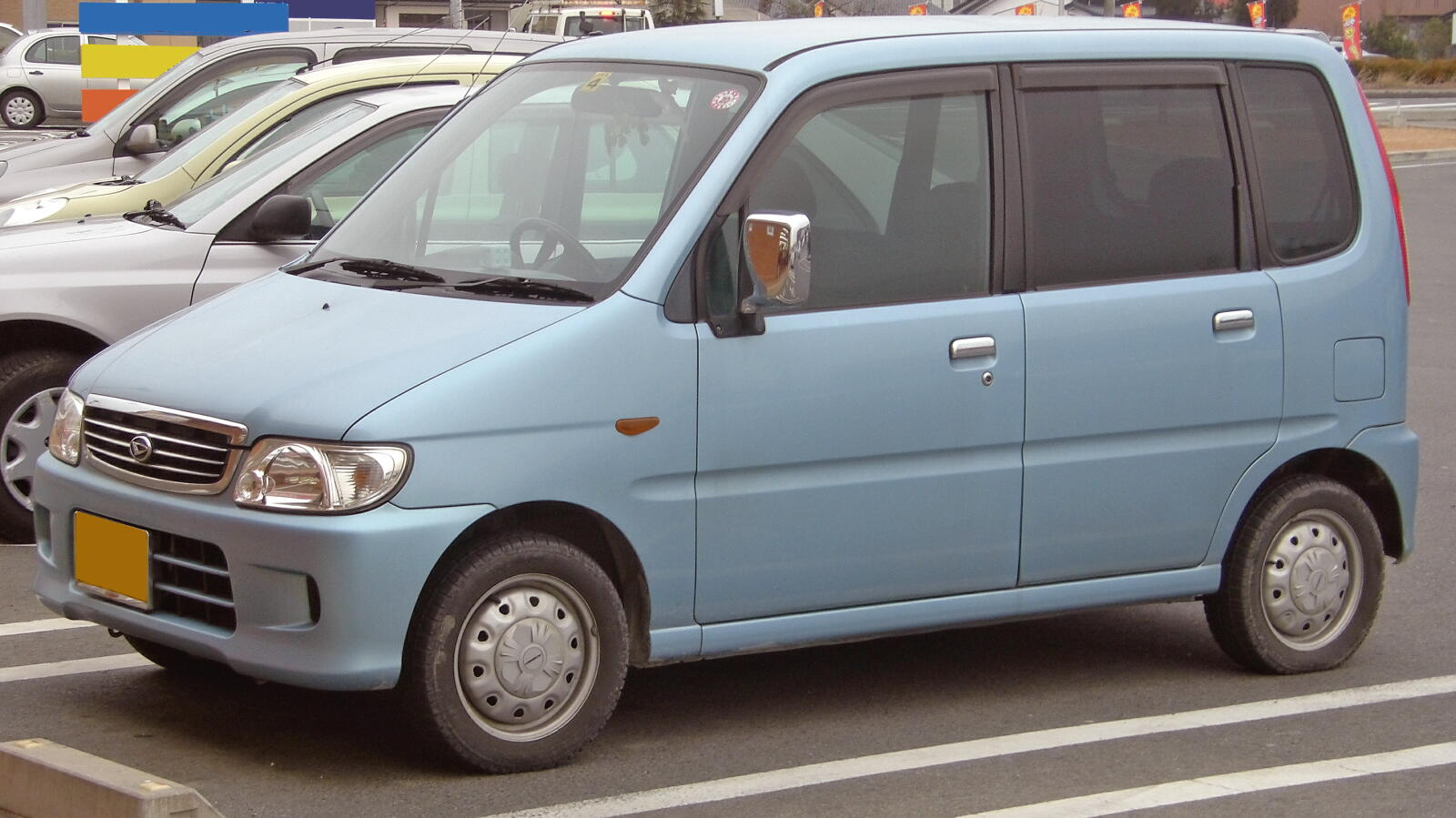
2000 Daihatsu Move CX (L900S)

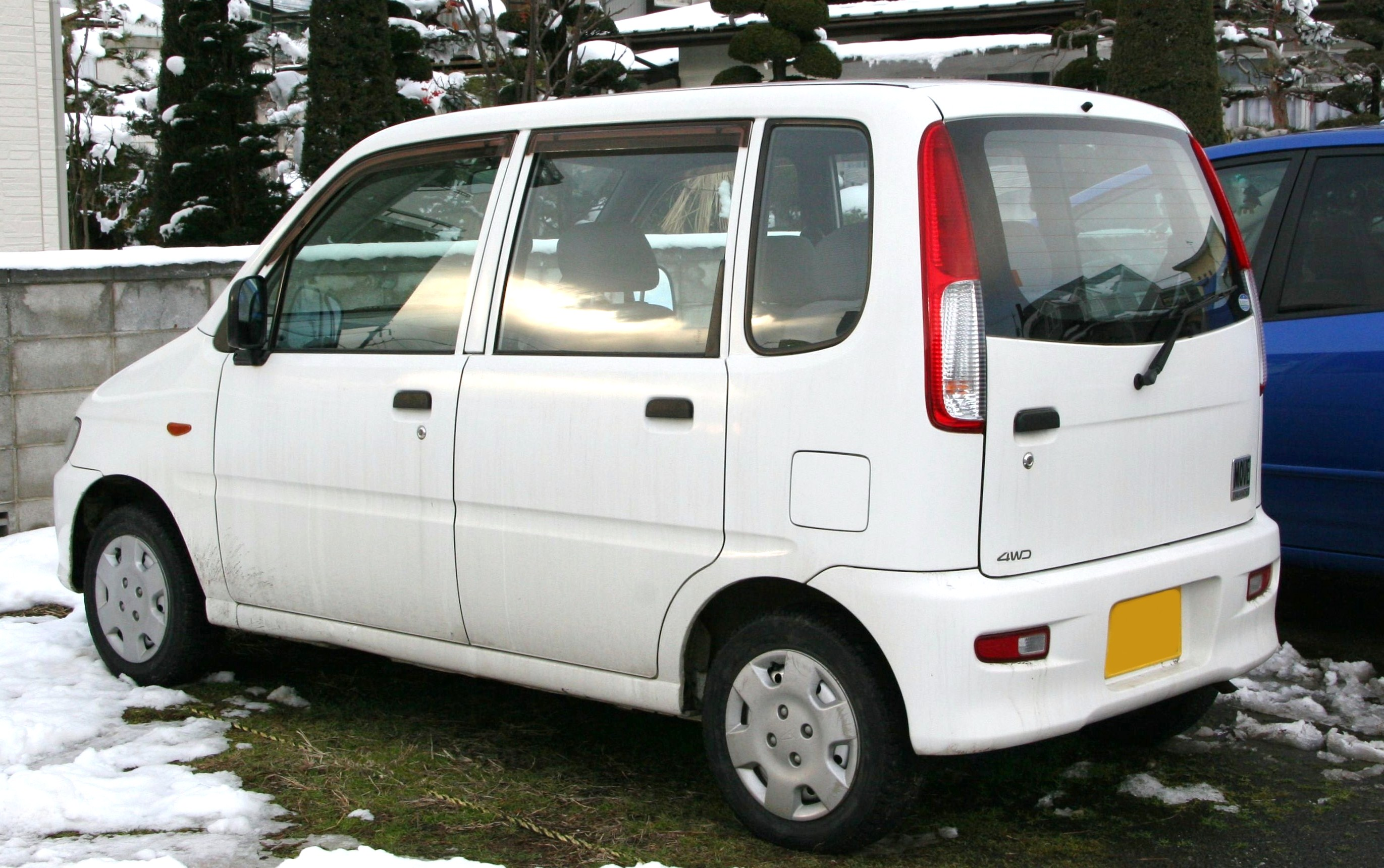
2000–2002 Daihatsu Move 4WD (L910S)

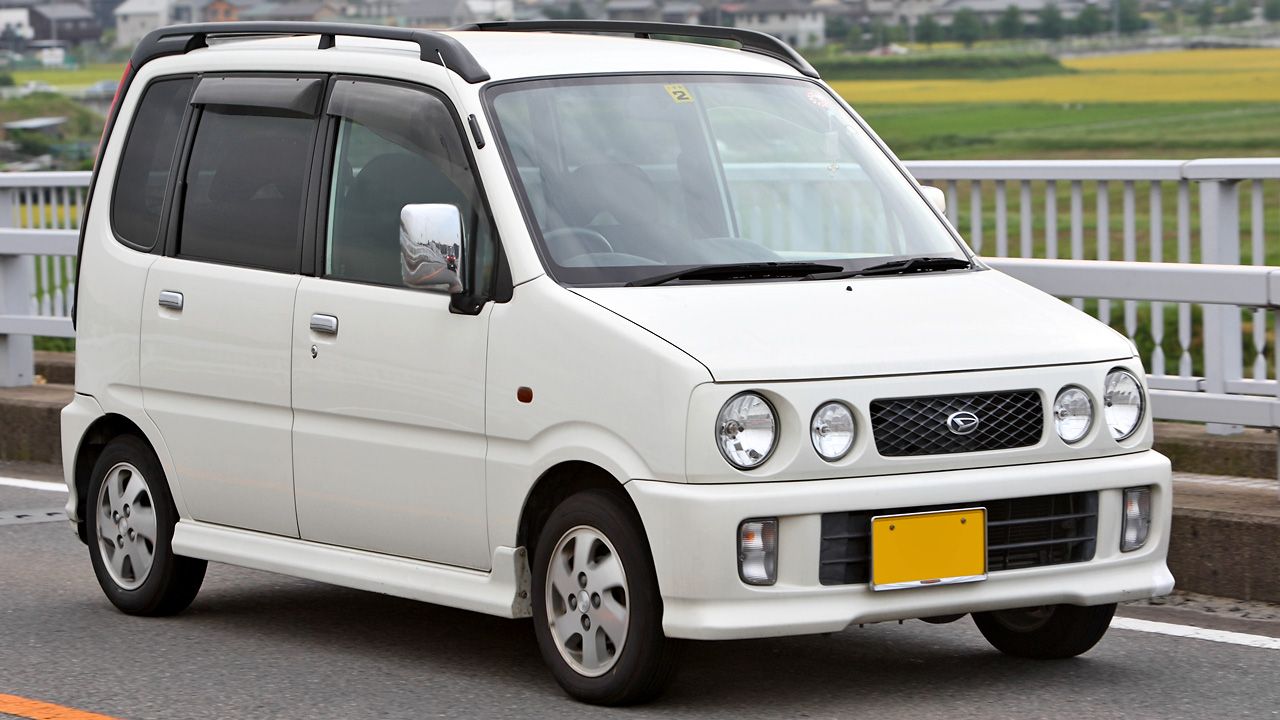
Daihatsu Move Custom (L900S)

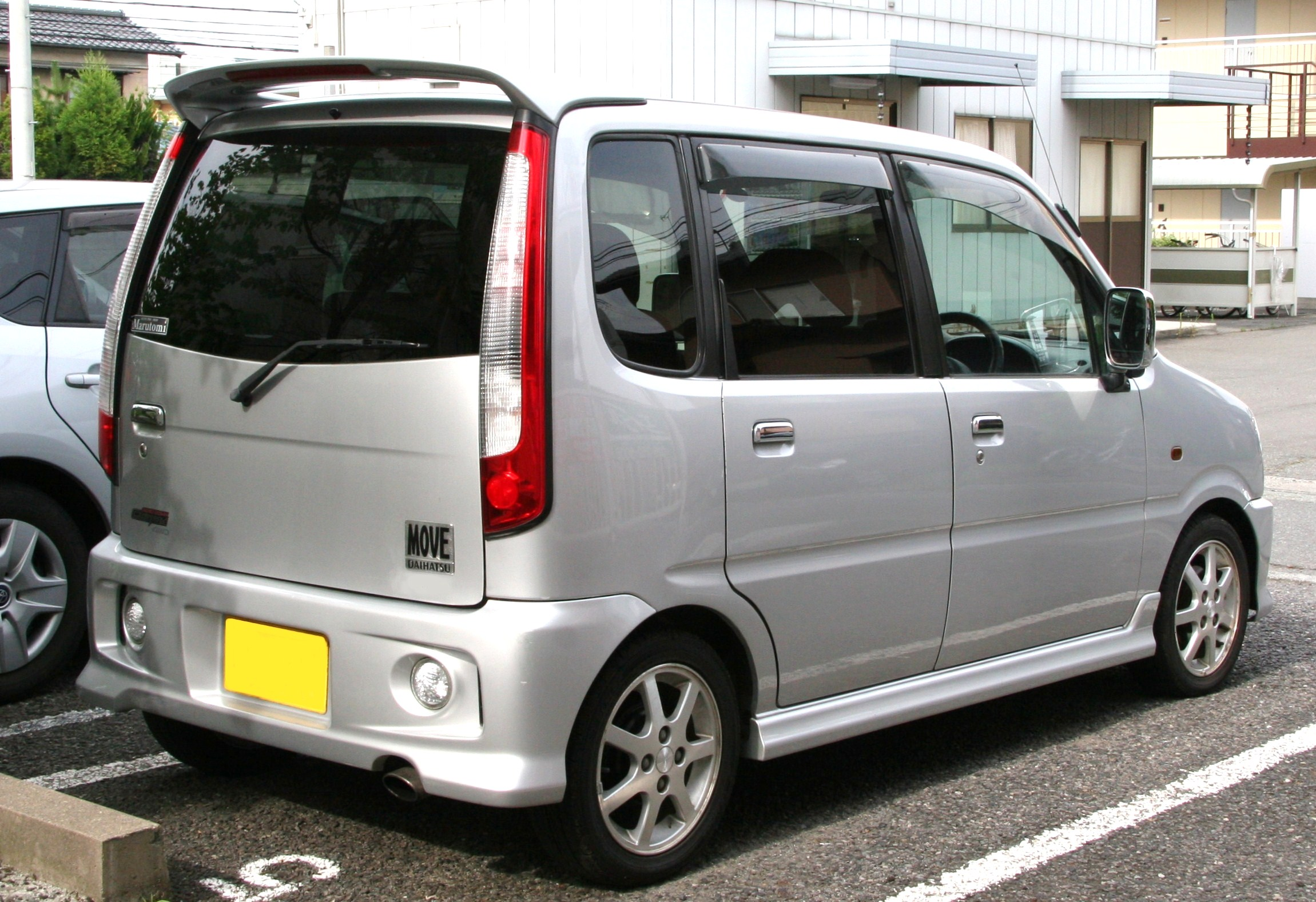
2000–2002 Daihatsu Move Custom (L900S)

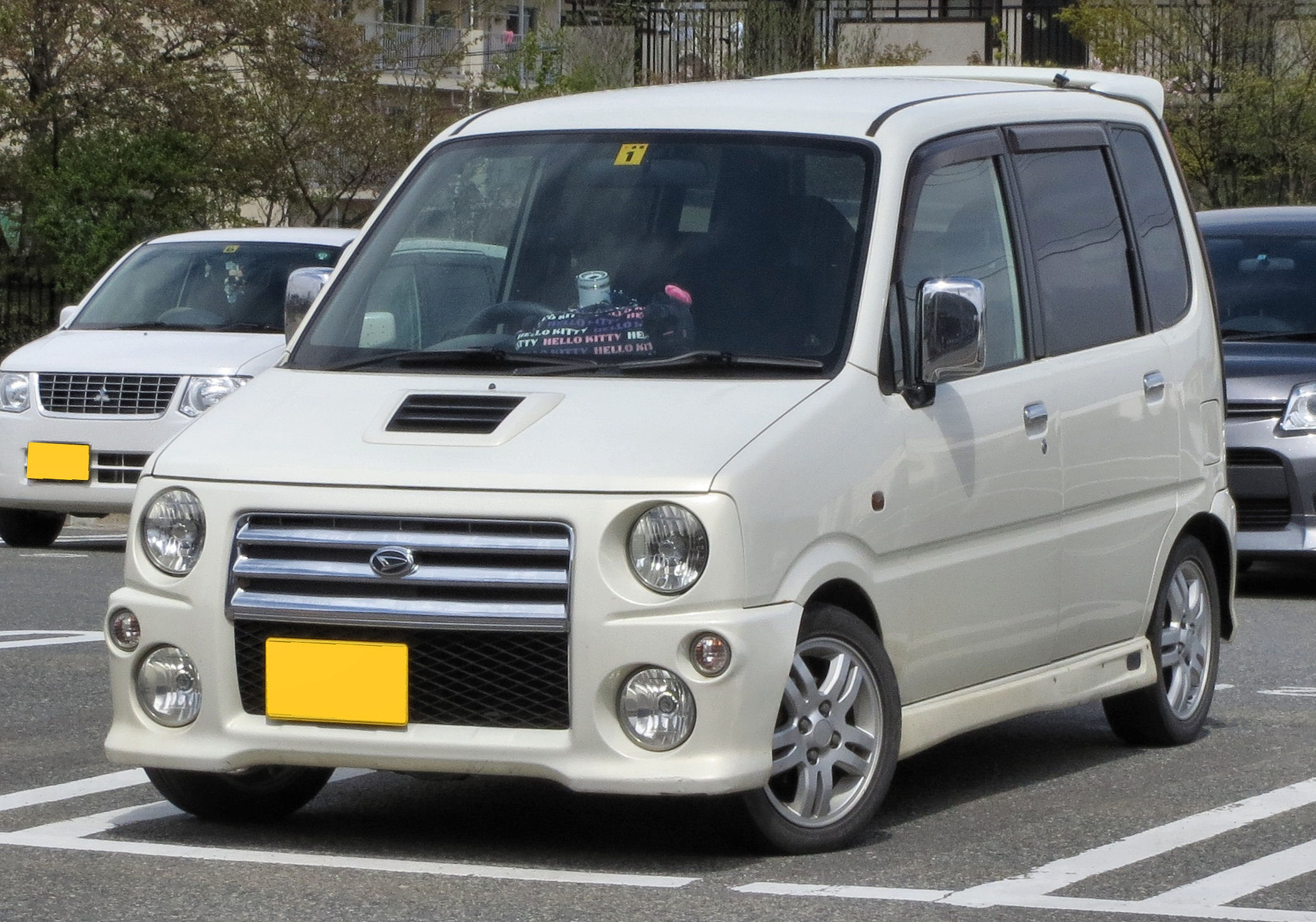
Daihatsu Move Aero Down RS 4WD (L910S)

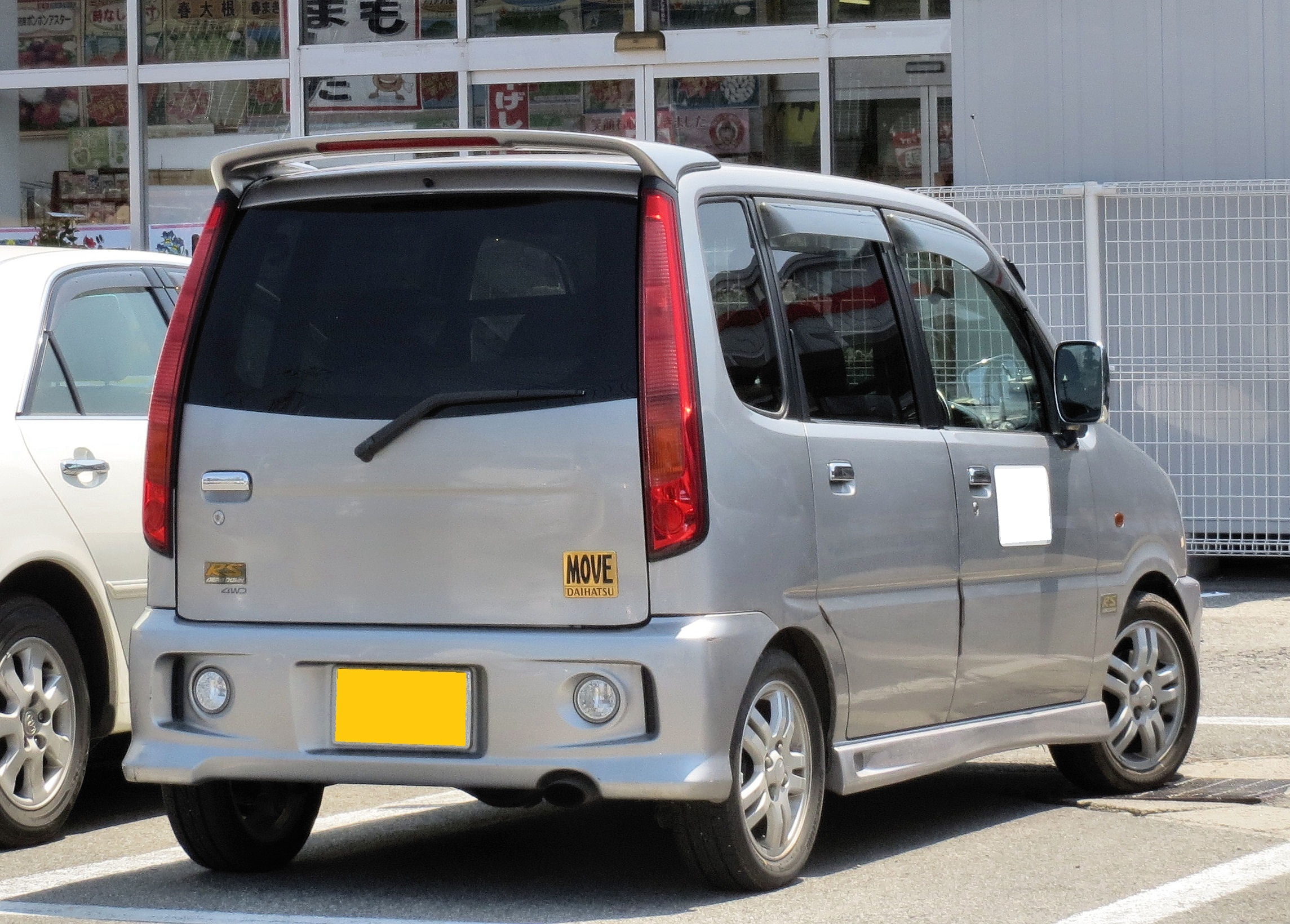
Daihatsu Move Aero Down RS 4WD (L910S)

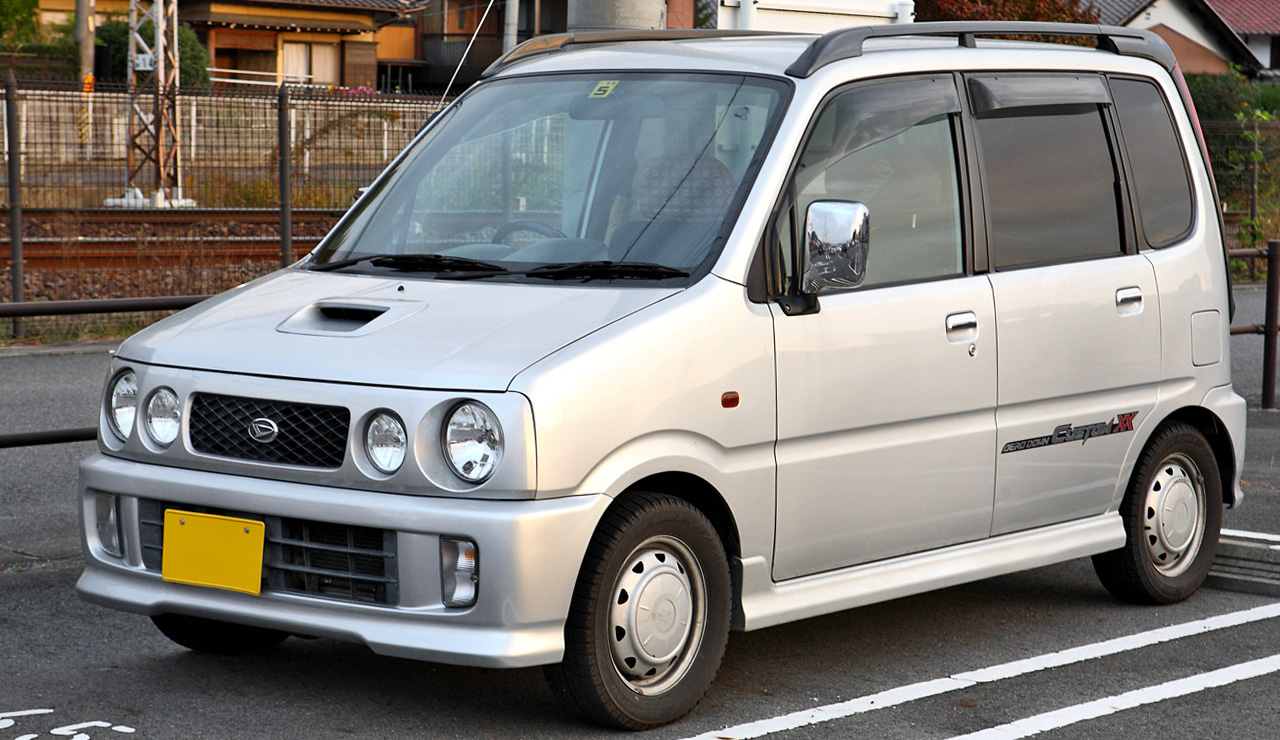
Daihatsu Move Aero Down Custom XX (L902S)

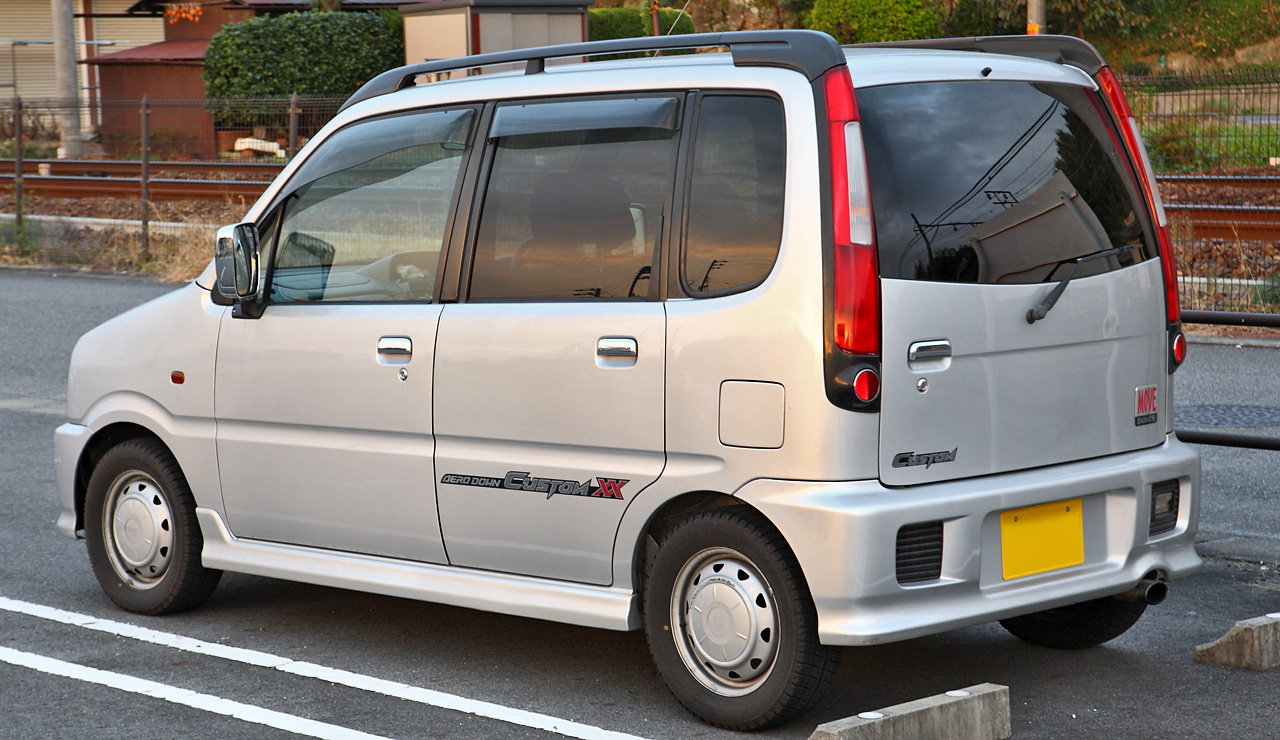
Daihatsu Move Aero Down Custom XX (L902S)

== Third generation (L150; 2002) ==
Third generation
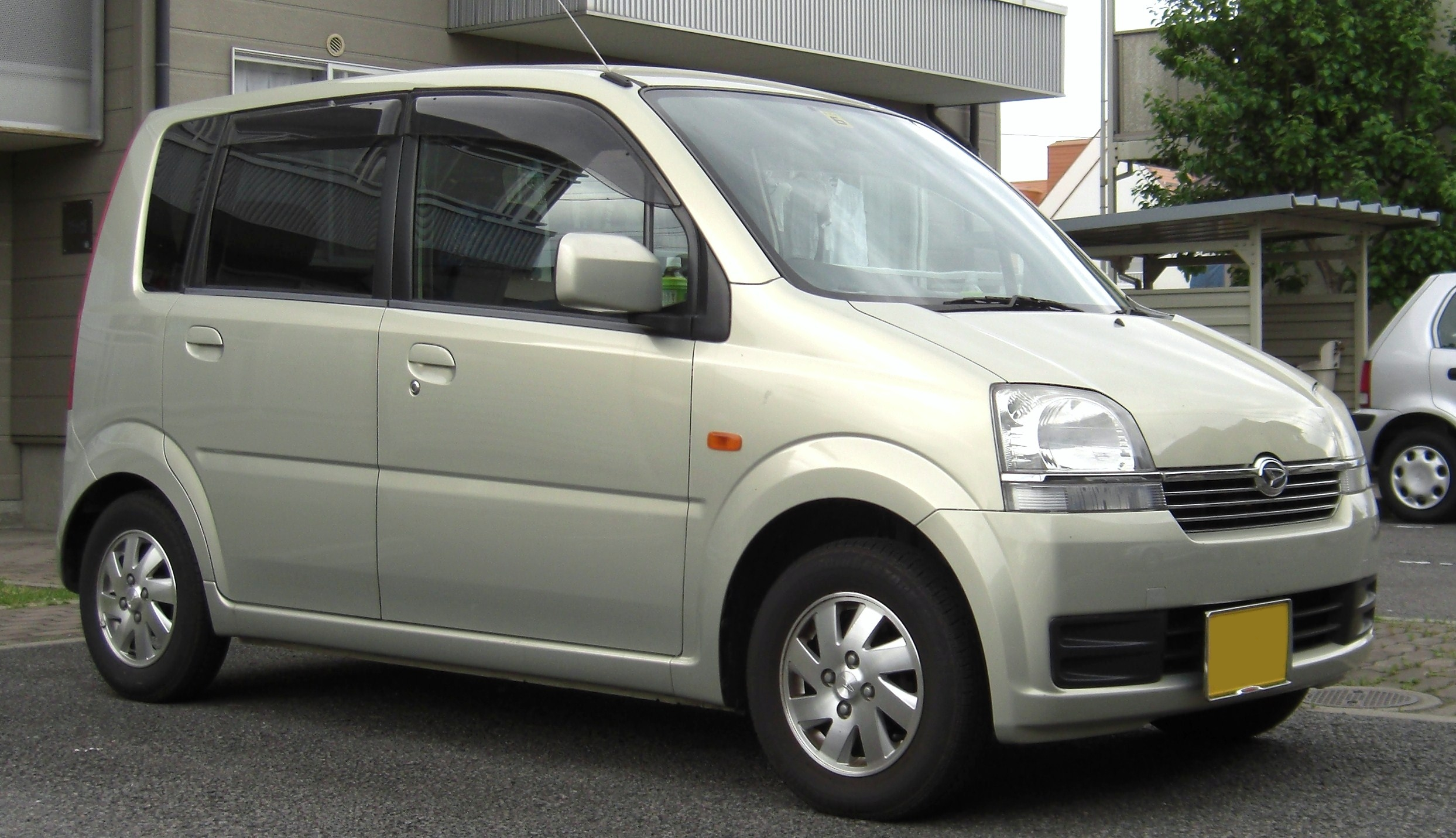
- 2002–2004 Daihatsu Move (L150S, pre-facelift)

Overview
- Model code: L150/L152/L160
- Production: October 2002 – October 2006

Body and chassis
- Body style: 5-door hatchback
- Related: Daihatsu Move Latte; Daihatsu Mira (L250)

Powertrain
- Engine: Petrol: 659 cc EF-VE I3; 659 cc EF-DET turbo I3; 659 cc JB-DET turbo I4
- Power output: 58 PS (43 kW; 57 hp) (EF-VE); 64 PS (47 kW; 63 hp) (EF-DET, JB-DET)
- Transmission: 5-speed manual; 4-speed automatic; CVT

Dimensions
- Wheelbase: 2,390 mm (94.1 in)
- Length: 3,395 mm (133.7 in)
- Width: 1,475 mm (58.1 in)
- Height: 1,630 mm (64.2 in)
- Kerb weight: 790–900 kg (1,742–1,984 lb)

The third-generation Move was introduced in October 2002 and has a rounded derivative called Move Latte. The side opening rear gate was retained, but a top-hinged rear door was available as an option. The model code was L150, with L160 signifying four-wheel drive (only available with the EF engine) and L152 indicating that the car had the JB family four-cylinder engine. In addition to the regular Move series, there was again a sportier Move Custom, which received more aggressive looking twin headlights with semi-circular cutouts in the front bumper. The range included the L, X, and R (turbocharged), either as Move or Move Custom, with the Move Custom RS and RS Limited with sports suspension at the top of the price list. The RS models with front-wheel drive were the only models which were fitted with the four-cylinder, all-aluminium JB-JL engine. A host of special editions became available soon after introduction.

The lineup received a gentle facelift in December 2004, along with minor reshuffling of the trim variants. The grille, bumpers, and taillights were redesigned, with the grille no longer extending downwards into the front bumper. The Move R was discontinued and replaced by the lower-cost L-Turbo, while the Move Custom RS Limited was removed from the price lists. The manual transmission option was restricted to the Move L (front- or four-wheel drive). Special editions kept appearing at a steady pace until the third generation was replaced in October 2006, after over 650,000 examples had been built.

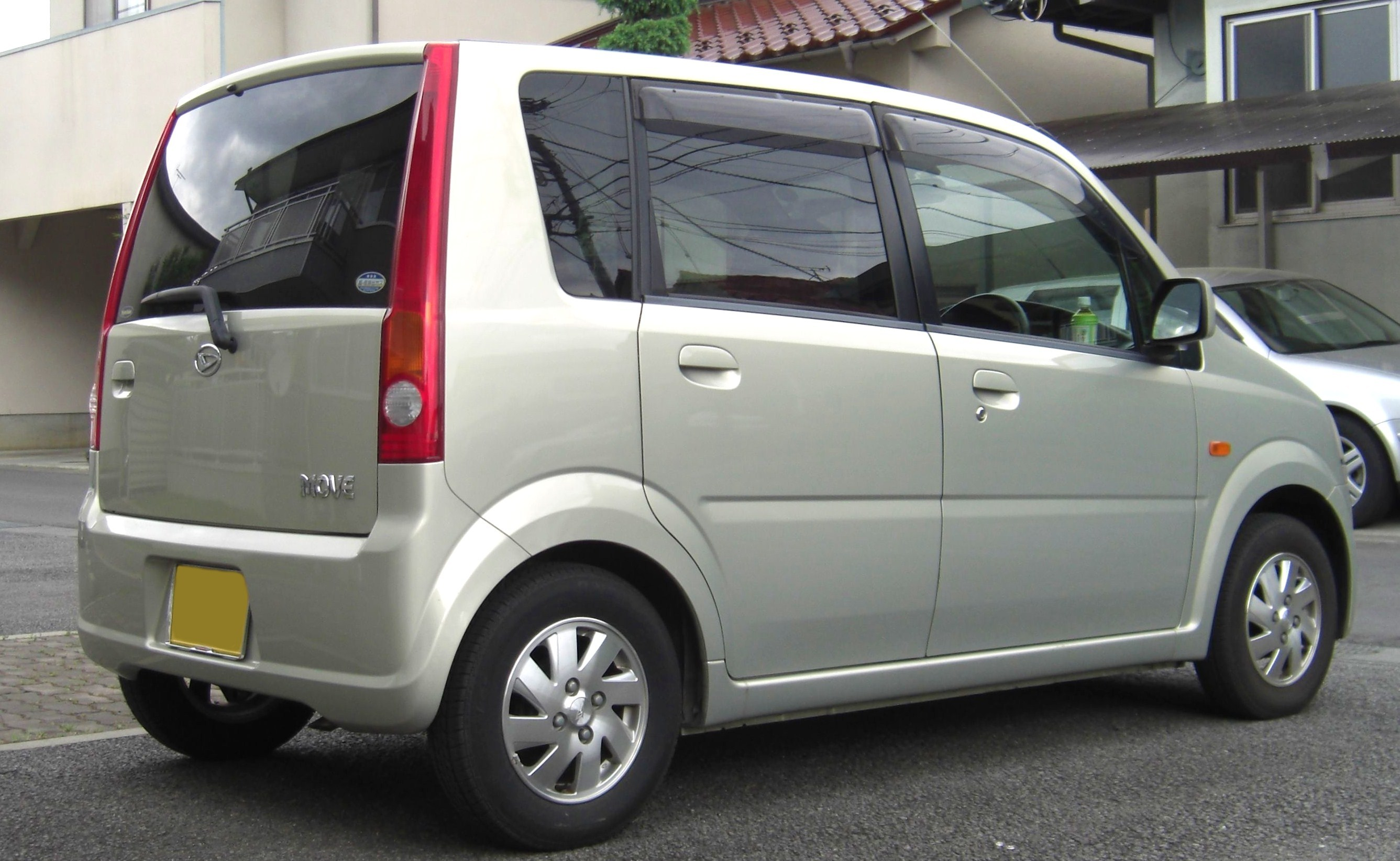
2002–2004 Daihatsu Move (L150S, pre-facelift)

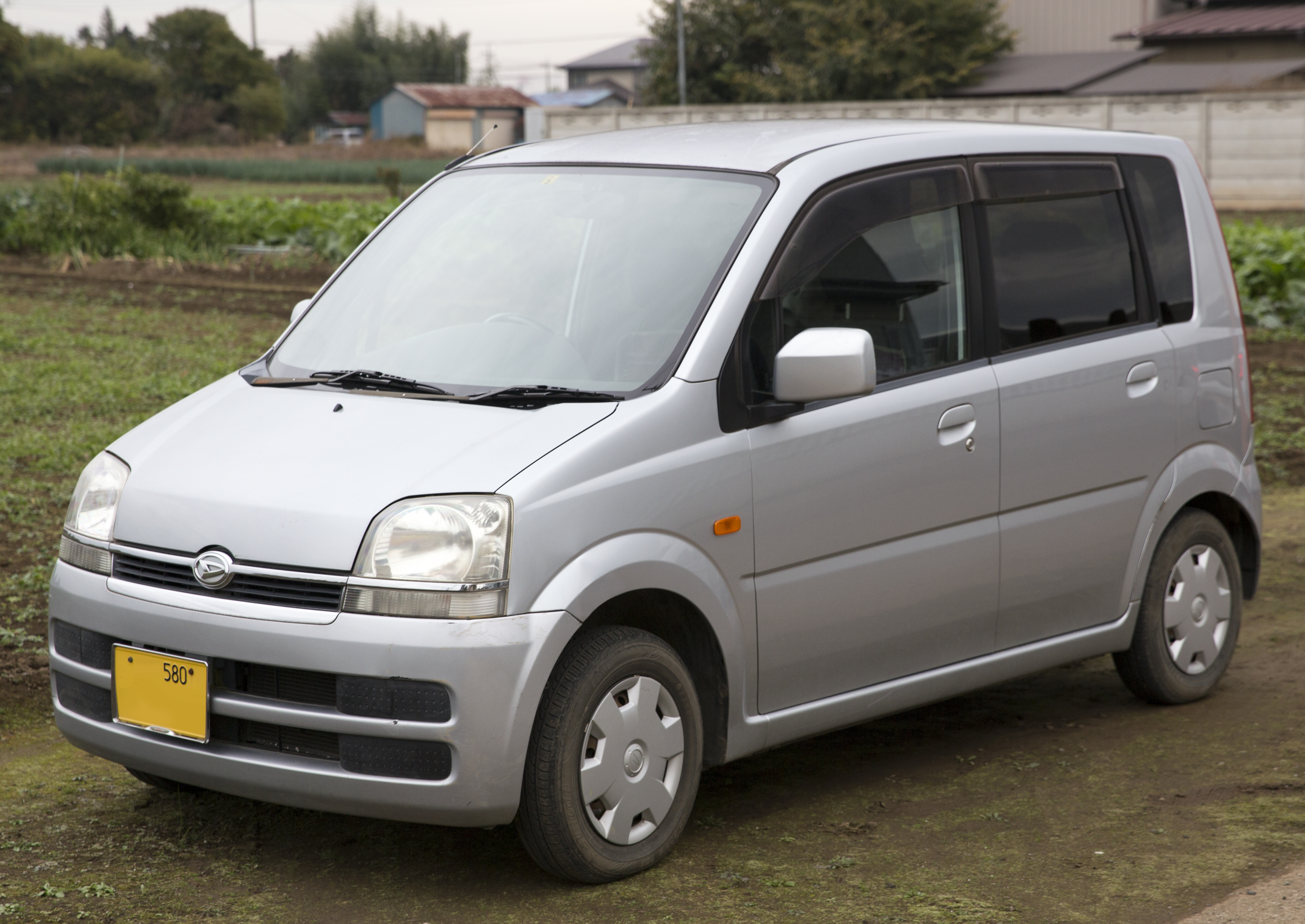
2004–2006 Daihatsu Move (L150S, facelift)

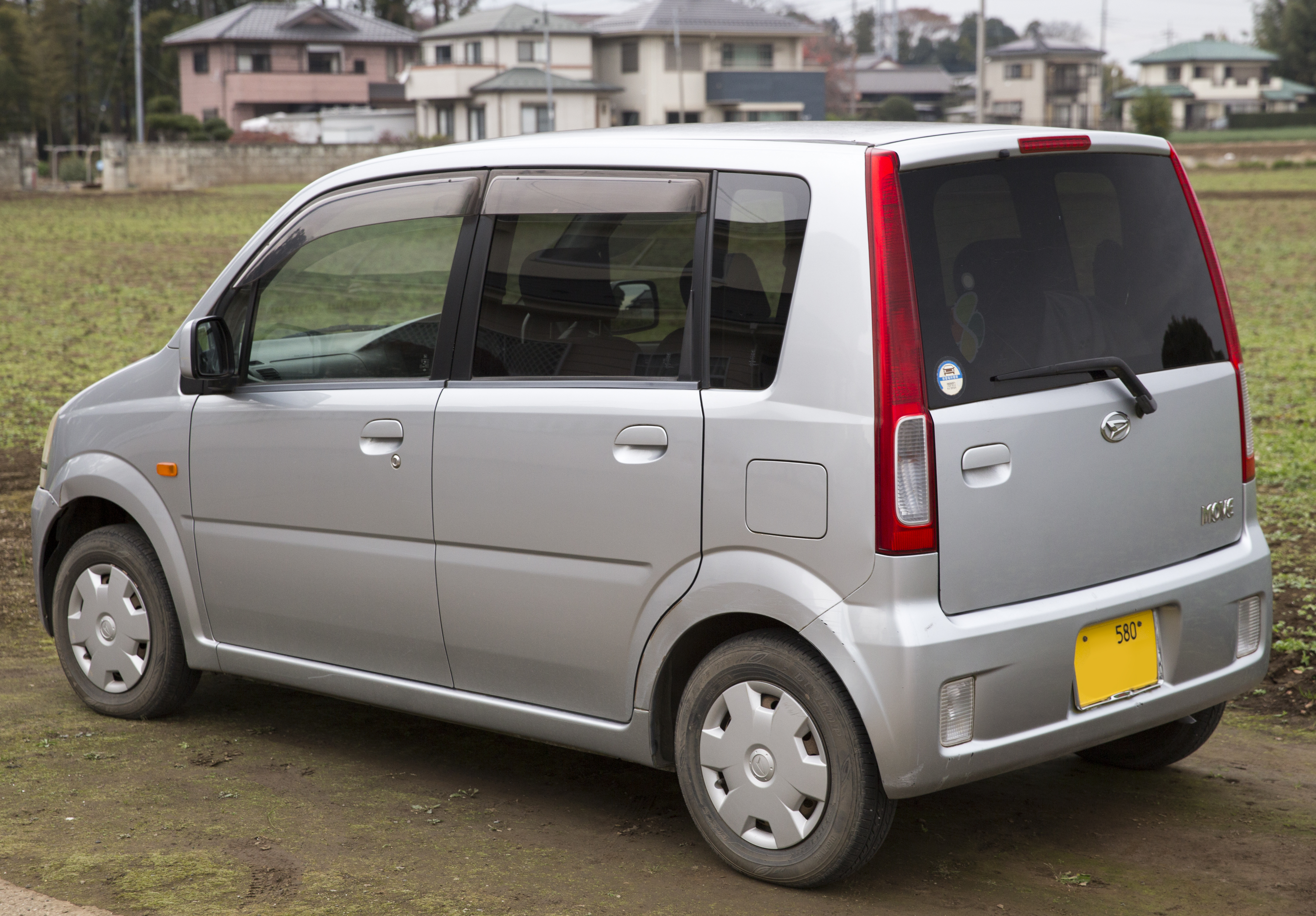
2004–2006 Daihatsu Move (L150S, facelift)

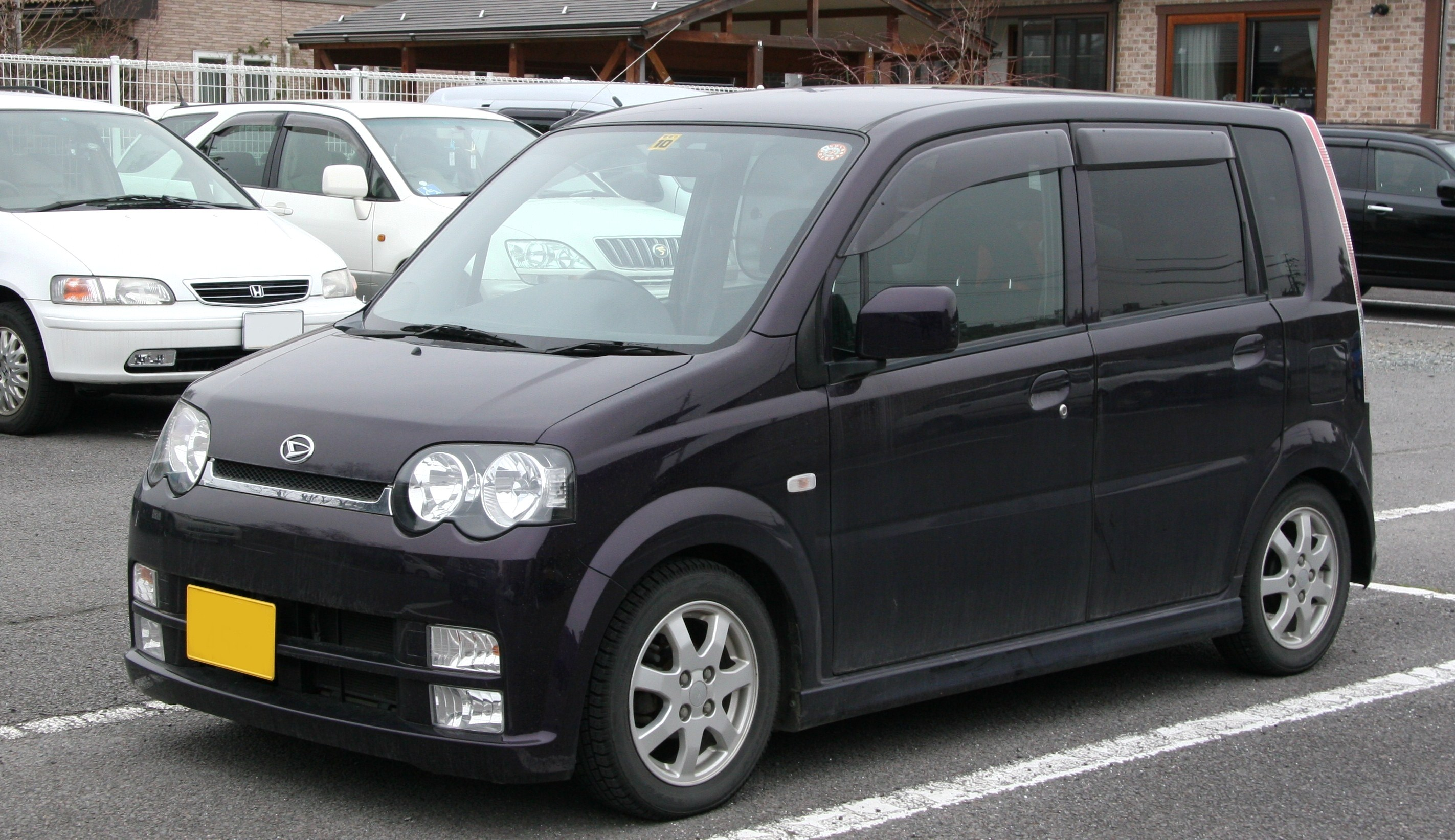
2002–2004 Daihatsu Move Custom (L150S, pre-facelift)

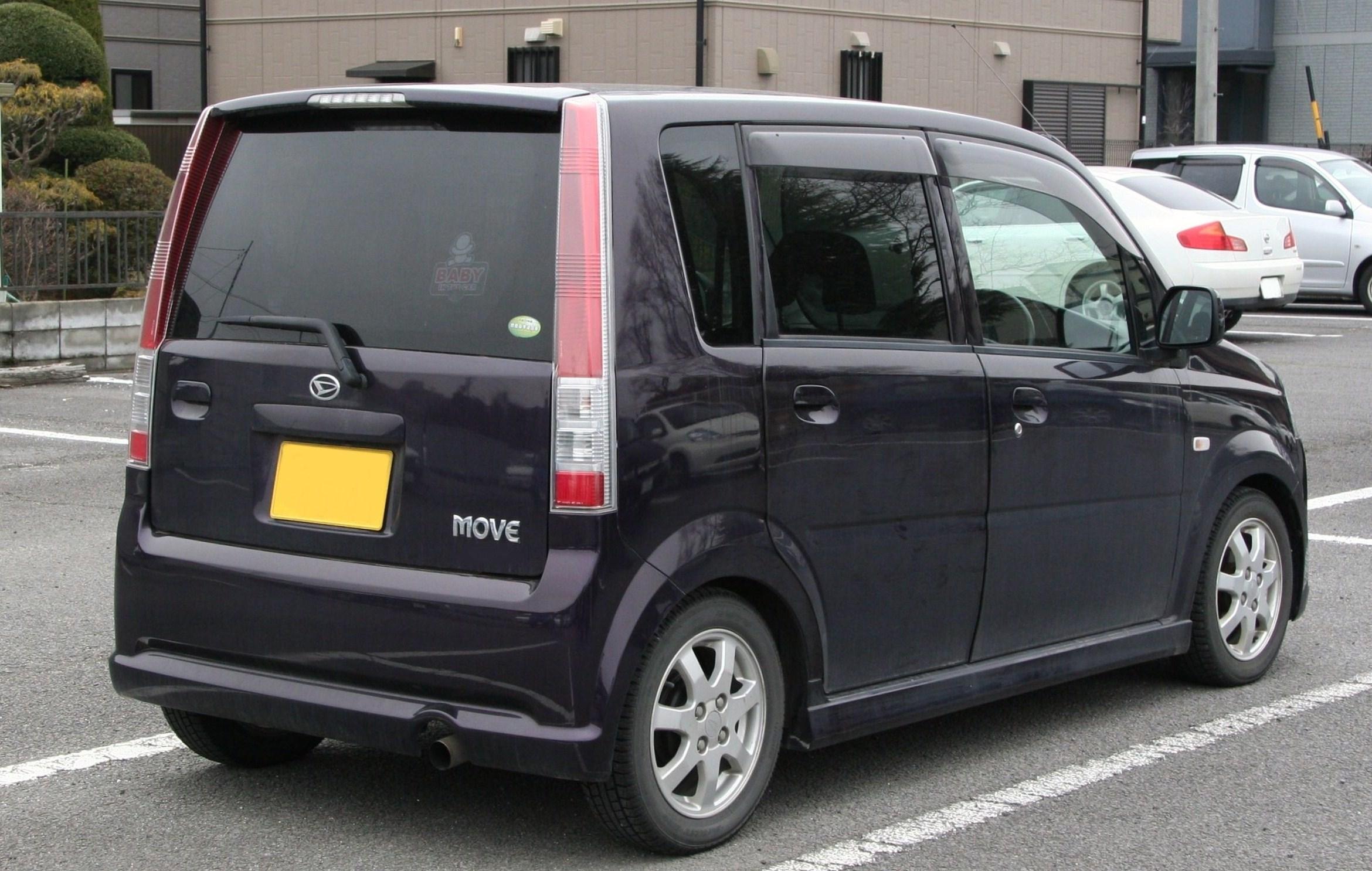
2002–2004 Daihatsu Move Custom (L150S, pre-facelift)

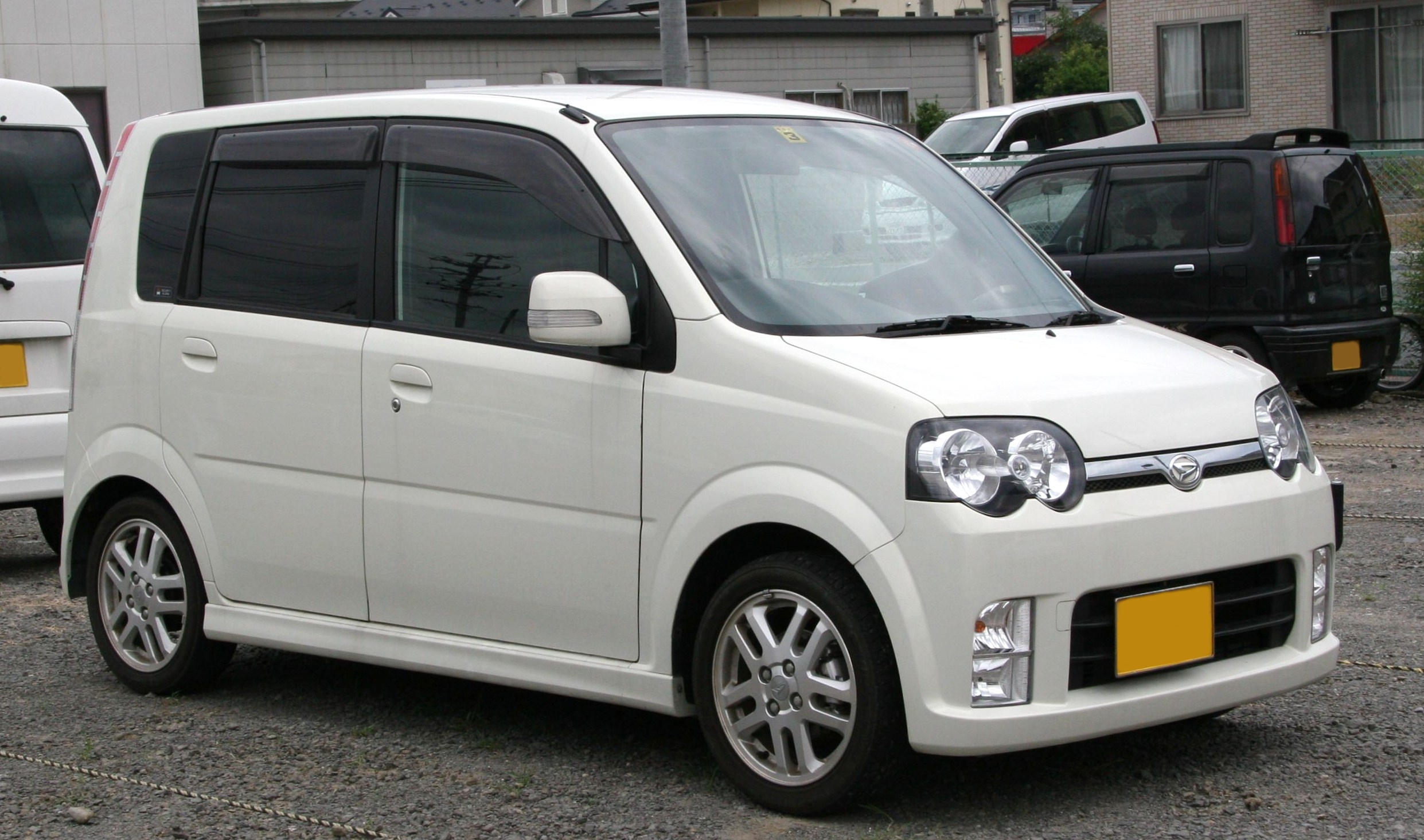
2004–2006 Daihatsu Move Custom (L150S, facelift)

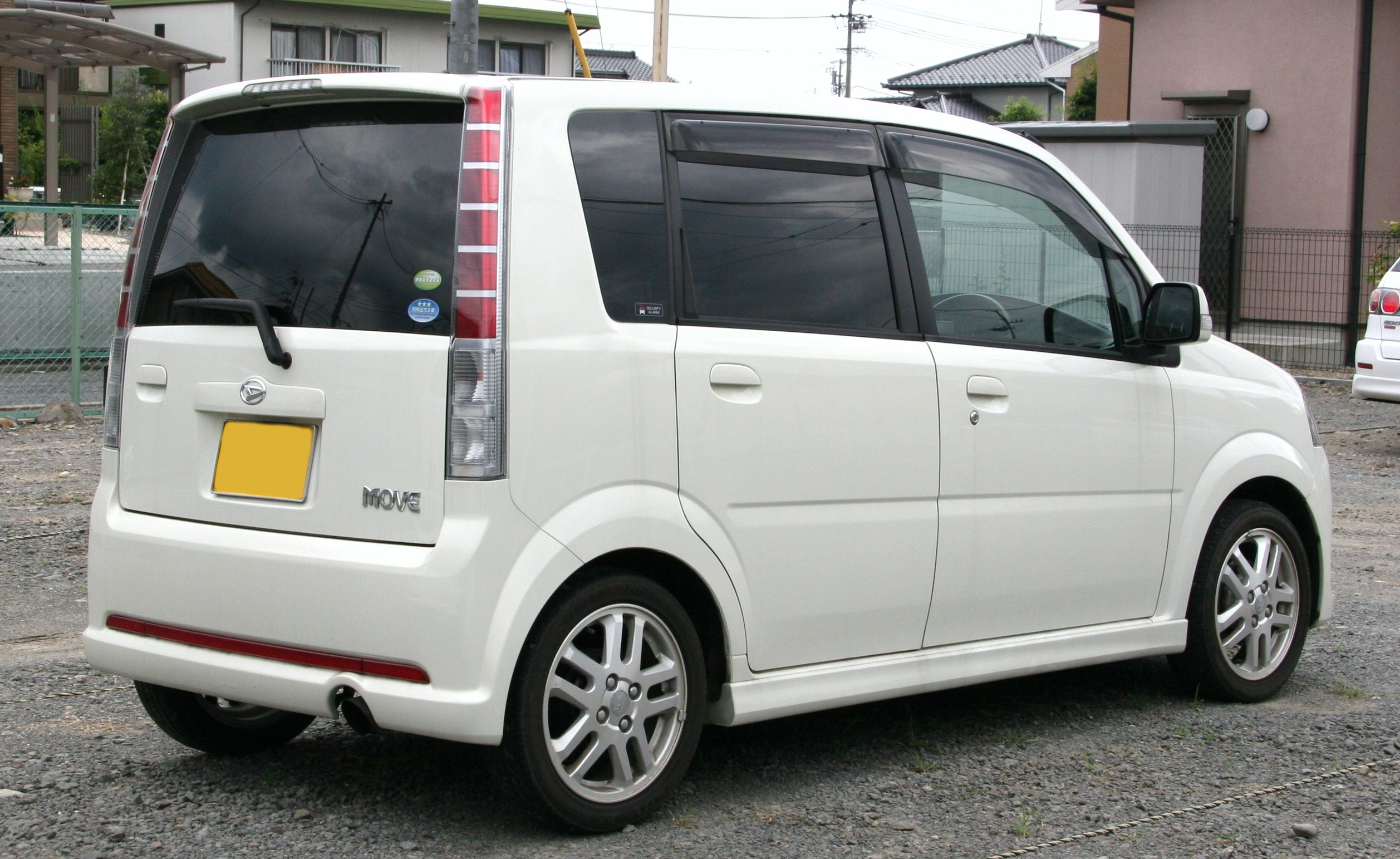
2004–2006 Daihatsu Move Custom (L150S, facelift)

== Fourth generation (L175; 2006) ==
Fourth generation
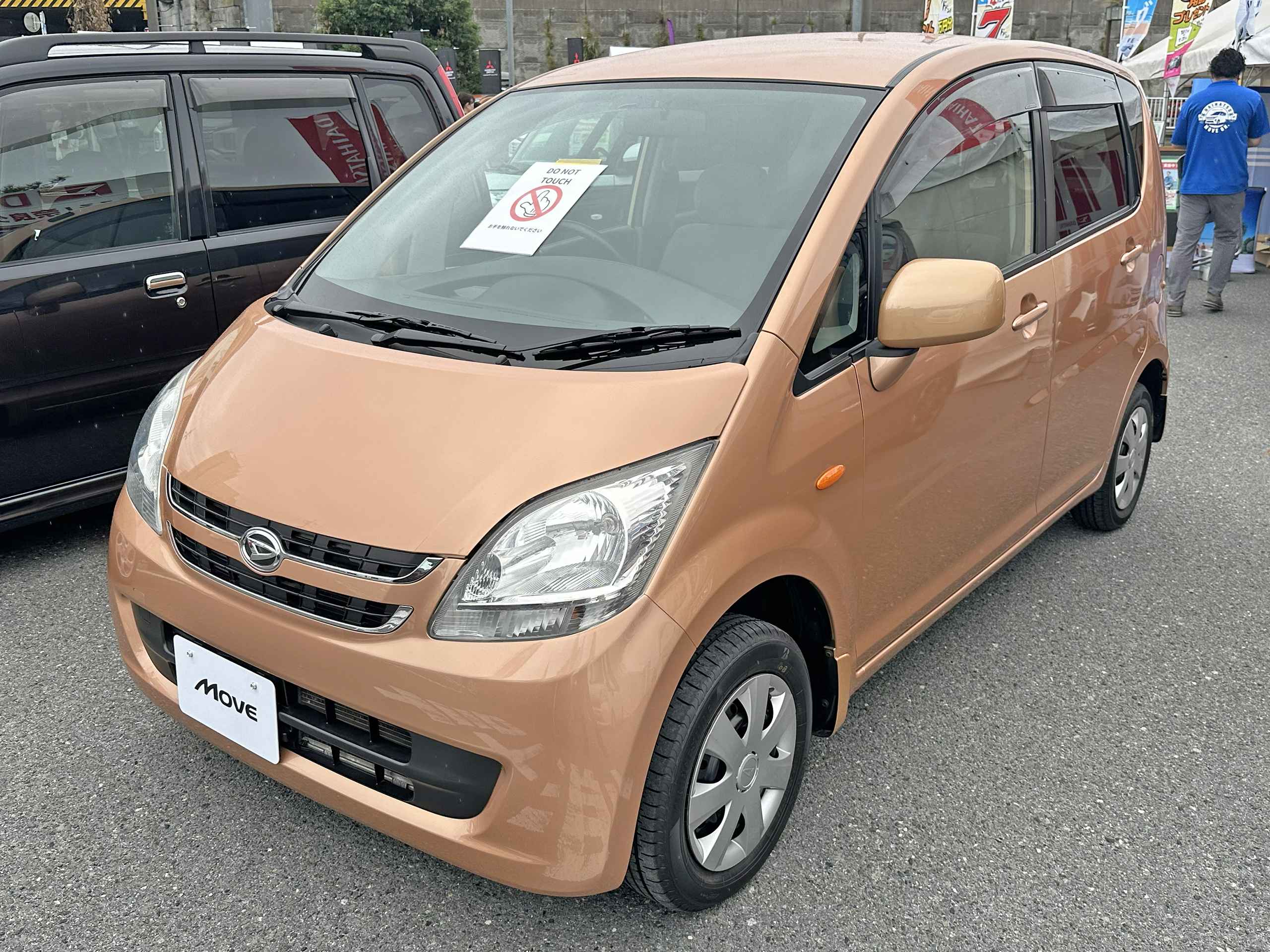
- 2006 Daihatsu Move L (L175S, pre-facelift)

Overview
- Model code: L175/L185
- Production: October 2006 – December 2010

Body and chassis
- Body style: 5-door hatchback
- Related: Daihatsu Move Conte; Daihatsu Mira (L275)

Powertrain
- Engine: Petrol: 658 cc KF-VE I3; 658 cc KF-DET turbo I3
- Power output: 43 kW (58 PS) (KF-VE); 47 kW (64 PS) (KF-DET)
- Transmission: 5-speed manual; 4-speed automatic; CVT

Dimensions
- Wheelbase: 2,490 mm (98.0 in)
- Length: 3,395 mm (133.7 in)
- Width: 1,475 mm (58.1 in)
- Height: 1,615 mm (63.6 in)
- Kerb weight: 810–930 kg (1,786–2,050 lb)

The fourth-generation Move was introduced in October 2006 and its design was a departure from the boxy look of the previous generations. A KF-VE-type non-turbo engine and a continuously variable transmission (CVT) were available on this model; a turbocharged engine remained an option for the Move Custom. The L175 has a derivative called Move Conte.

In December 2008, the Move received a small facelift, including new grilles and head- and taillights. The interior was also changed and equipment inmproved, with the adjustable package (seat height, tilt steering wheel, and adjustable height shoulder belt) becoming standard across the range. The Custom L was renamed Custom S, while the regular lineup was consolidated from five into three equipment grades. The turbocharged models (Move Custom only) were now only available in conjunction with the CVT transmission.

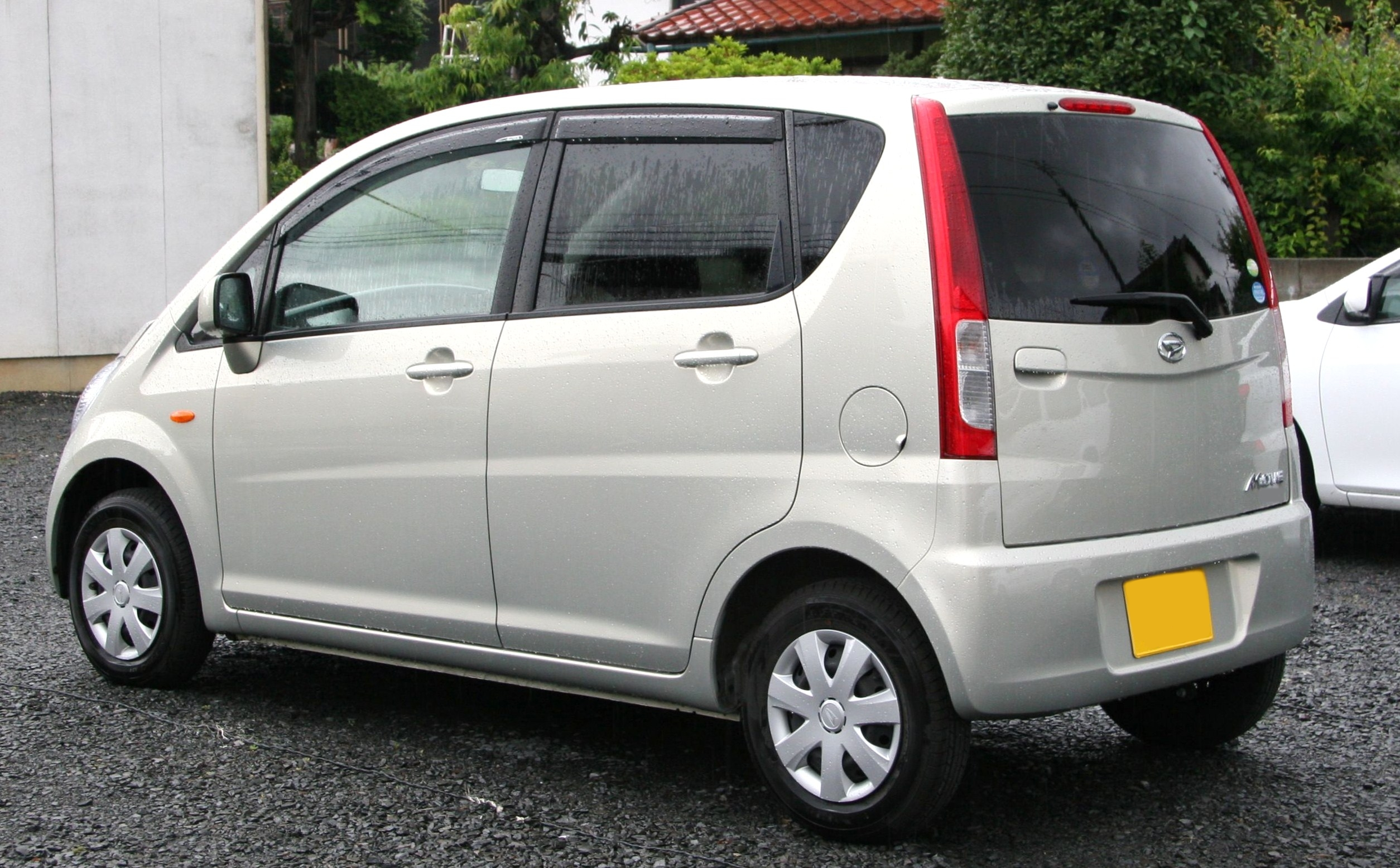
2006–2008 Daihatsu Move (L175S, pre-facelift)

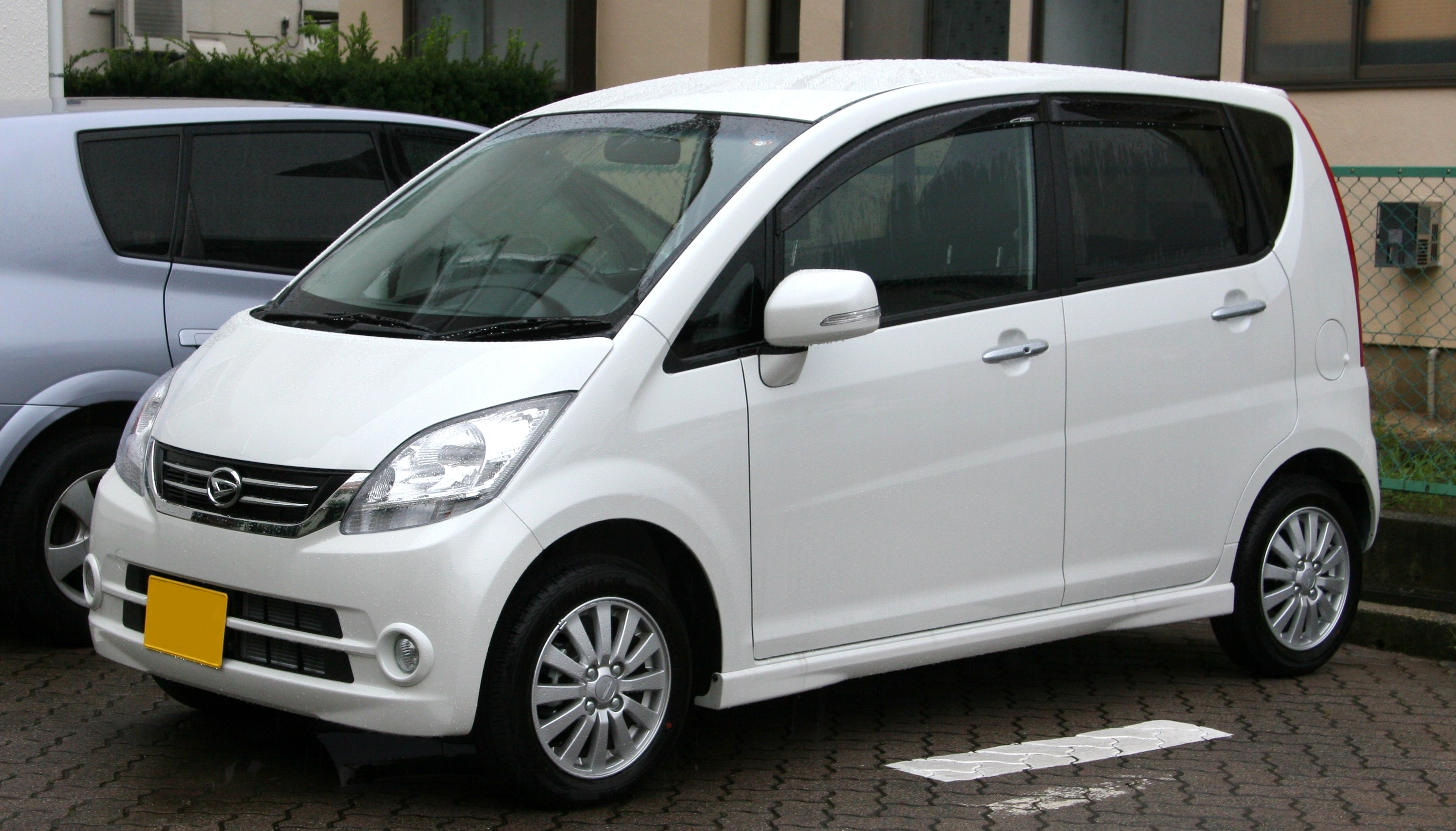
2008 Daihatsu Move (L175S, facelift)

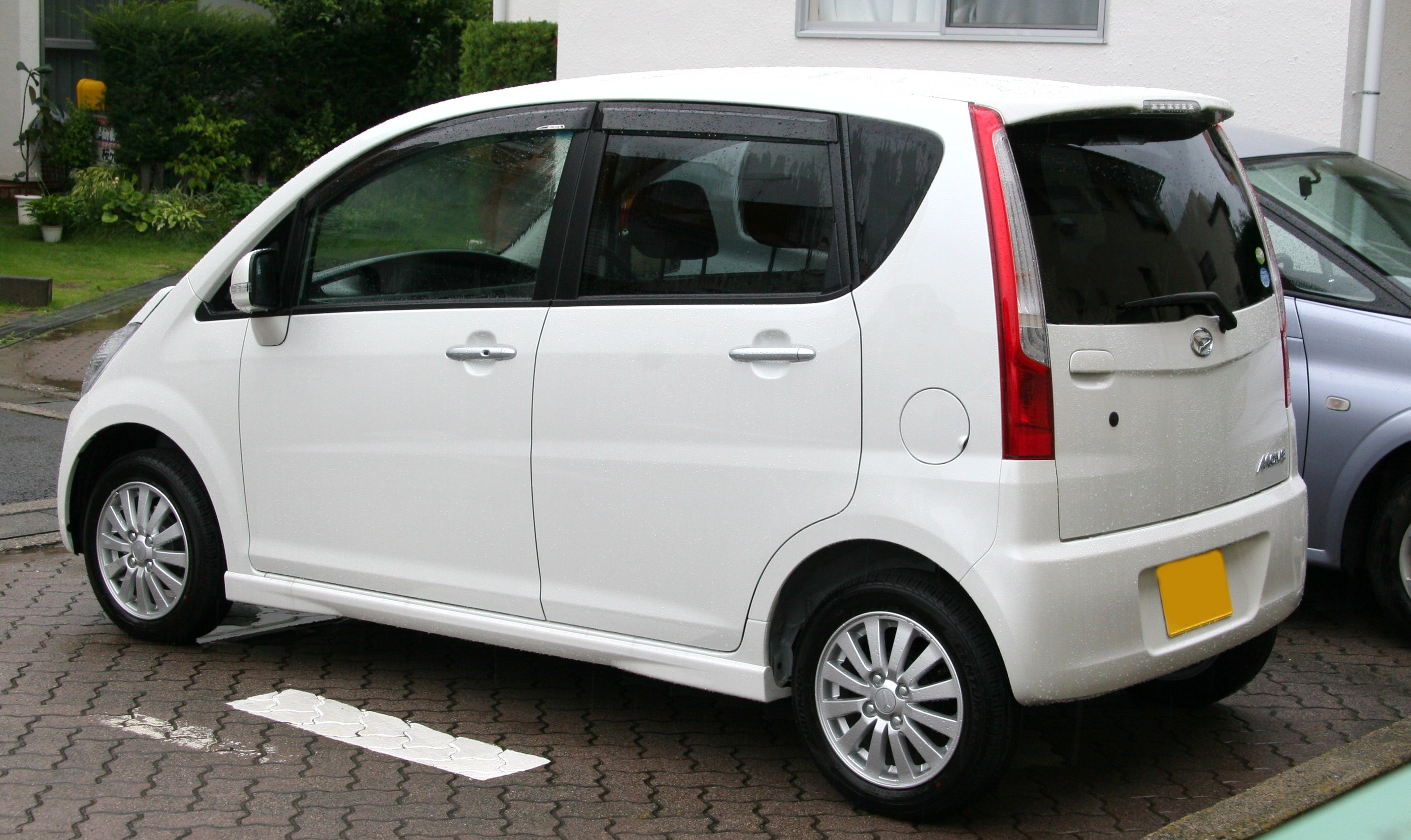
2008 Daihatsu Move (L175S, facelift)

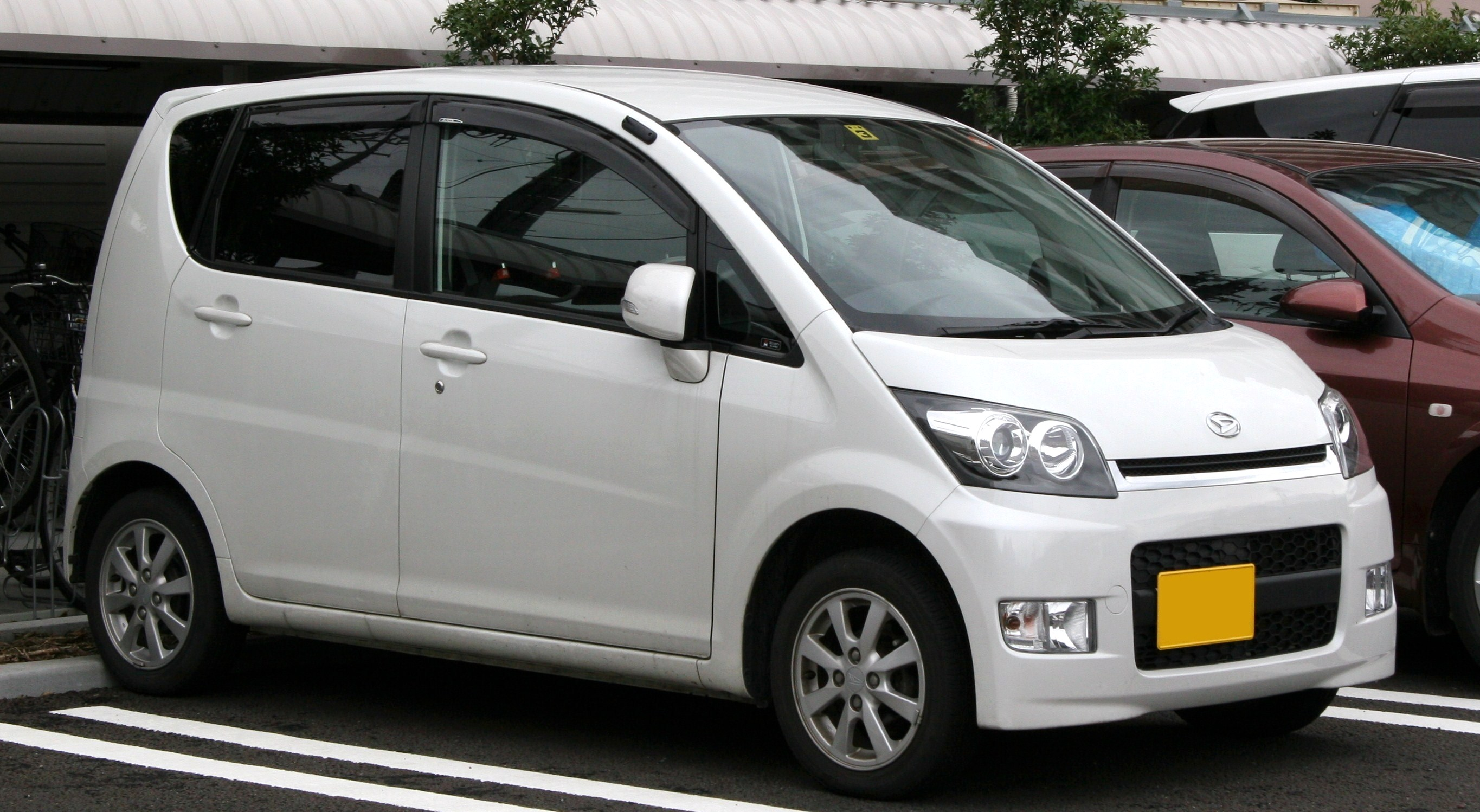
2006–2008 Daihatsu Move Custom (L175S, pre-facelift)

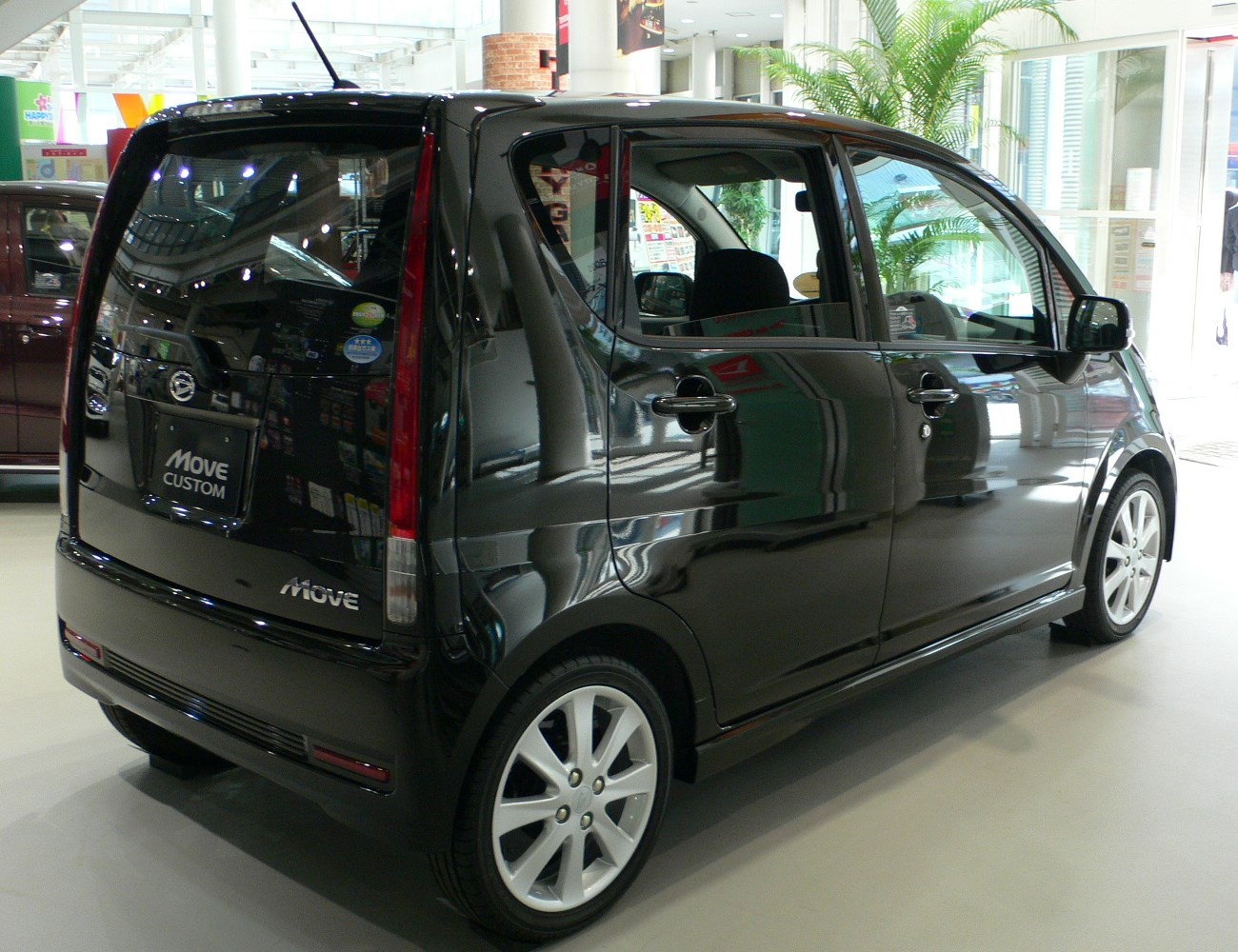
2006 Daihatsu Move Custom (L175S, pre-facelift)

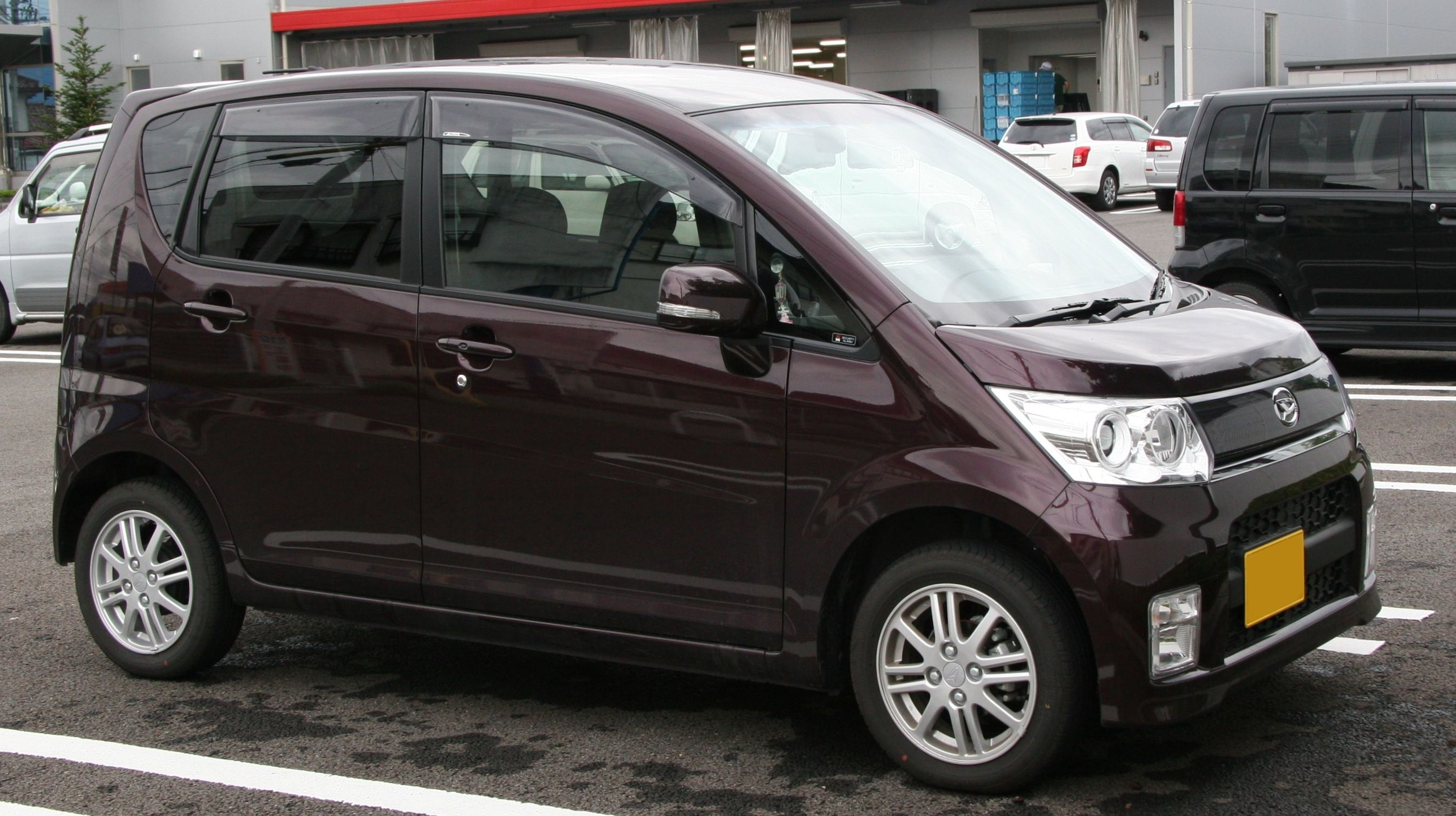
2008 Daihatsu Move Custom (L175S, facelift)

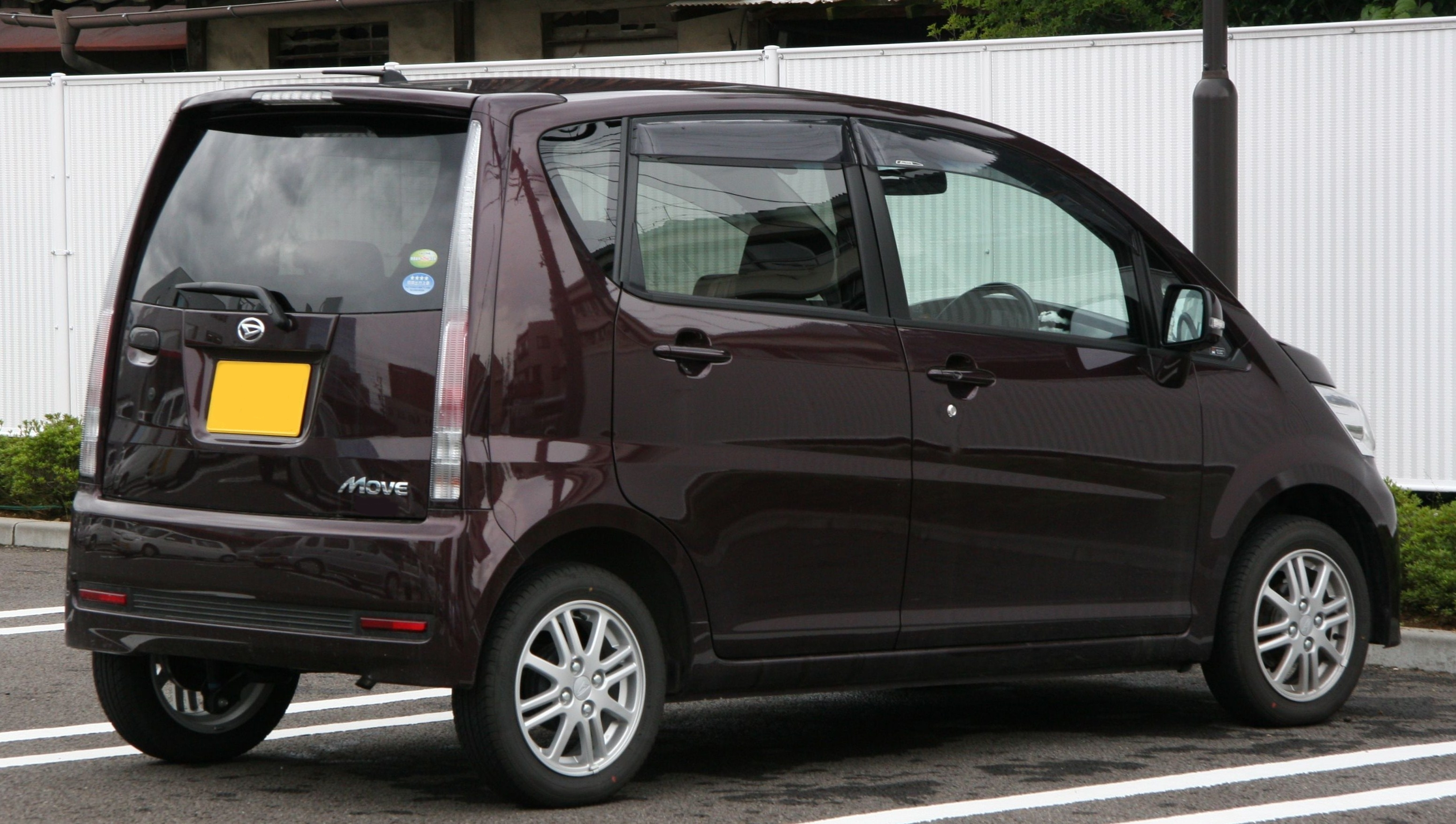
2008 Daihatsu Move Custom (L175S, facelift)

== Fifth generation (LA100; 2010) ==
Fifth generation
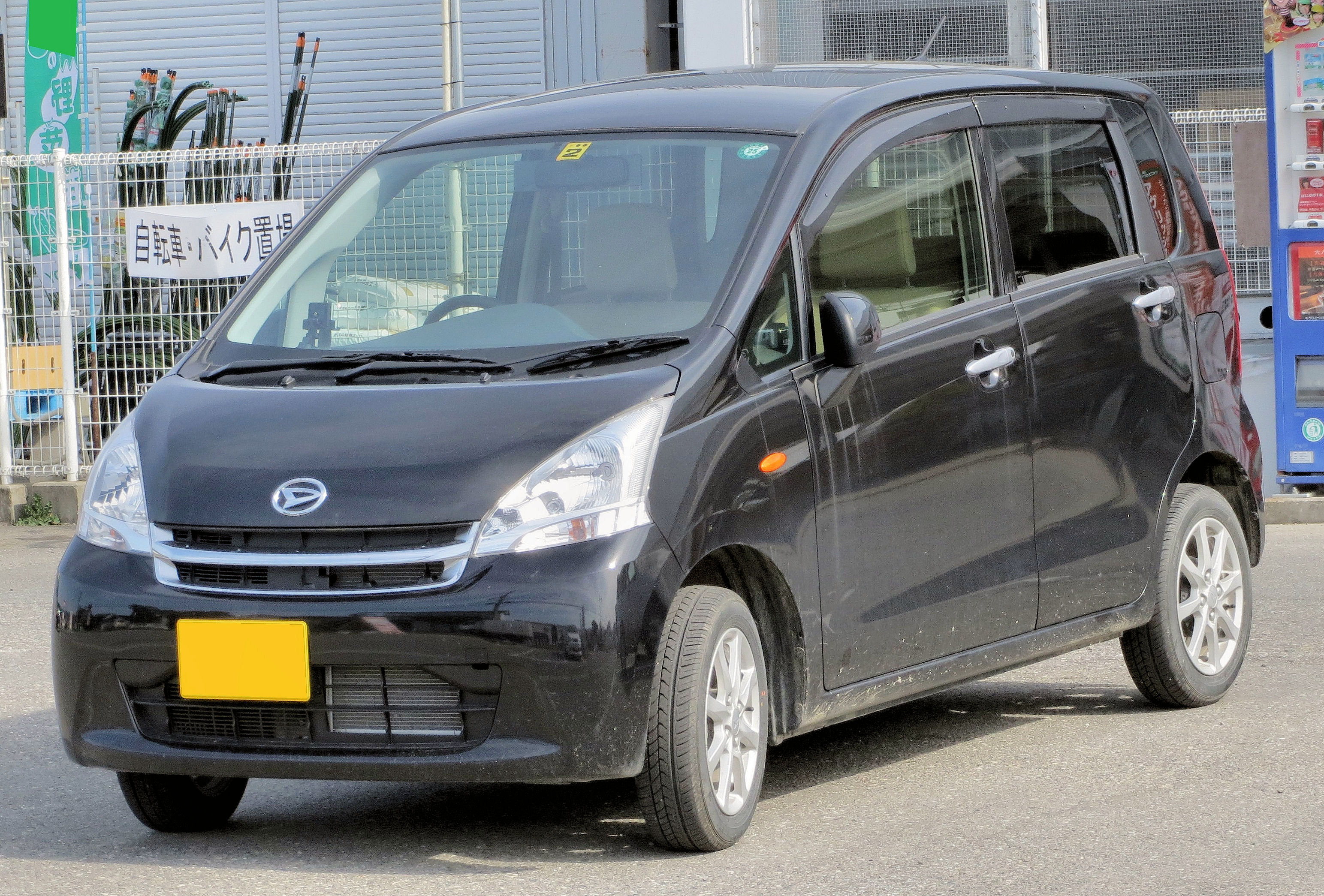
- Daihatsu Move X Limited (LA110S, pre-facelift)

Overview
- Model code: LA100
- Also called: Subaru Stella (second generation)
- Production: December 2010 – December 2014 (Move); May 2011 – December 2014 (Stella)
- Assembly: Japan: Ryūō, Shiga (Ryūō plant); Nakatsu, Ōita (Daihatsu Motor Kyushu)
- Designer: Yuji Kitagawa, Shinichi Nakabayashi and Eiji Murakami; Nobuhiro Hata, Shun Ohoka, and Mark Widjaja (Move Custom)

Body and chassis
- Body style: 5-door hatchback
- Related: Daihatsu Mira e:S (LA300)

Powertrain
- Engine: Petrol: 658 cc KF-VE I3; 658 cc KF-DET I3-T
- Power output: 43 kW (58 PS) (KF-VE); 47 kW (64 PS) (KF-DET)
- Transmission: CVT

Dimensions
- Wheelbase: 2,455 mm (96.7 in)
- Length: 3,395 mm (133.7 in)
- Width: 1,475 mm (58.1 in)
- Height: 1,620–1,635 mm (63.8–64.4 in)
- Kerb weight: 810–890 kg (1,786–1,962 lb)

The fifth-generation Move was introduced in December 2010. The car is also sold by Subaru as the second-generation Subaru Stella (Japanese: スバル・ステラ, Subaru Sutera) through an OEM agreement. In an effort to further improve fuel economy, the new Move was equipped with idle-stop technology and it was 35 kg (77 lb) lighter than the fourth generation. These efficiencies and parts reductions also lowered the cost of manufacture by about ten percent, allowing Daihatsu to lower prices while increasing equipment over the previous generation. The interior featured a symmetrical dashboard with a central cluster of gauges, and a sliding rear seat which allowed users to increase the space of the cargo compartment.

In December 2012, the Move received a light facelift, with a redesigned, blockier front end and new taillights. At the interior, the dashboard was redesigned, with the gauges moved in front of the driver rather than the original, center cluster layout. The air conditioning vents were moved, while additional storage cubbies were provided. Daihatsu's "Smart Assist" collision avoidance system was new, and a first for the kei class. The engine incorporated new emissions strategies such as Eco Idle and thermal control of the engine and CVT transmission, developed for the most recent Mira e:S. Aerodynamics were also improved, while the fuel tank was shrunk - from 36 to 30 L (9.5 to 7.9 US gal).

The Move Custom received larger taillights which extended to incorporate the roof spoiler. The Custom's bold appearance with significant chrome elements also continued; at the interior there were different gauges with chrome bezels and bespoke upholstery with a shimmering appearance. Period testers did note that the Custom's gauges were harder to read than the standard units, while the seat fabric was somewhat slippery.

Daihatsu Move

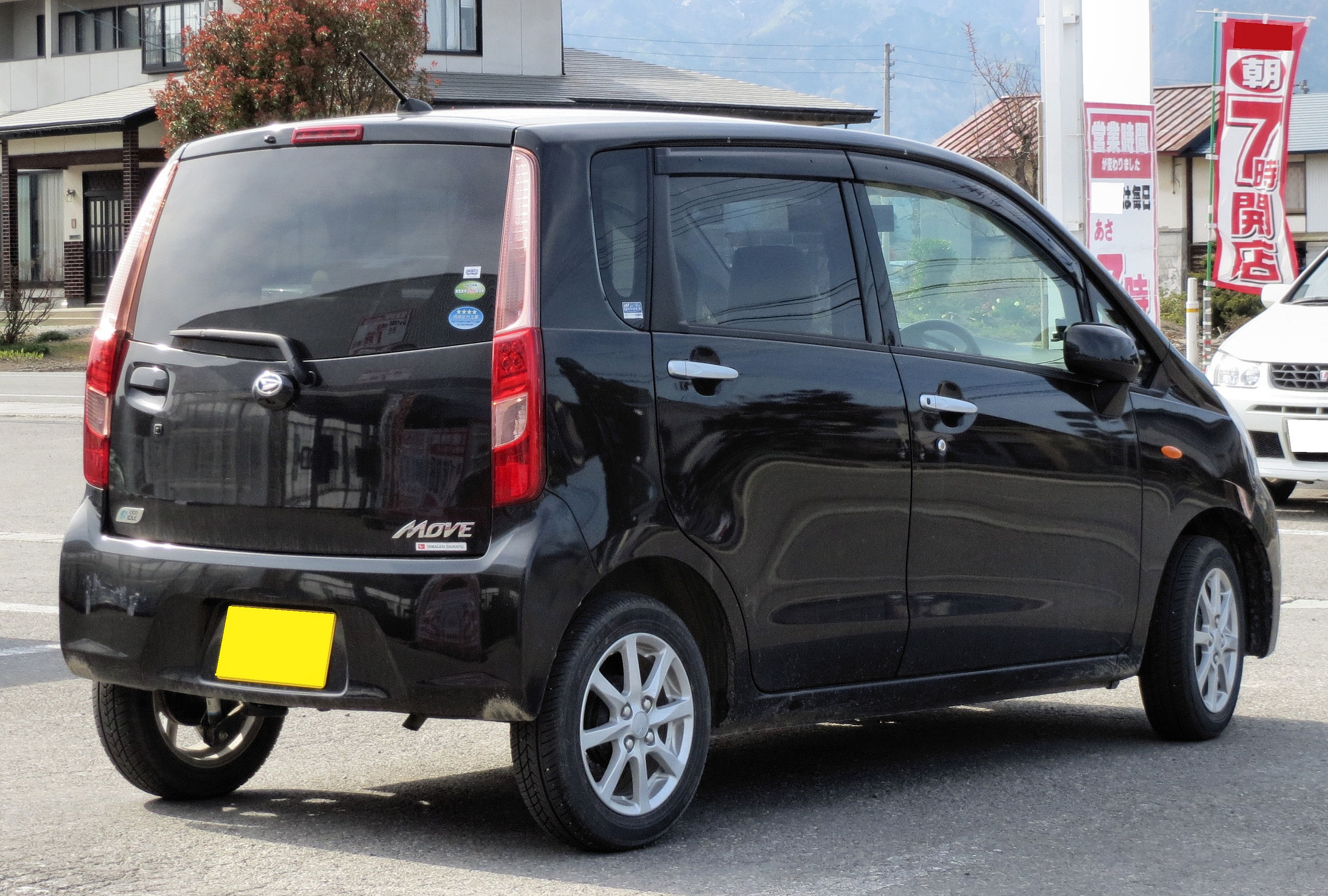
Daihatsu Move L 4WD (LA110S, pre-facelift)

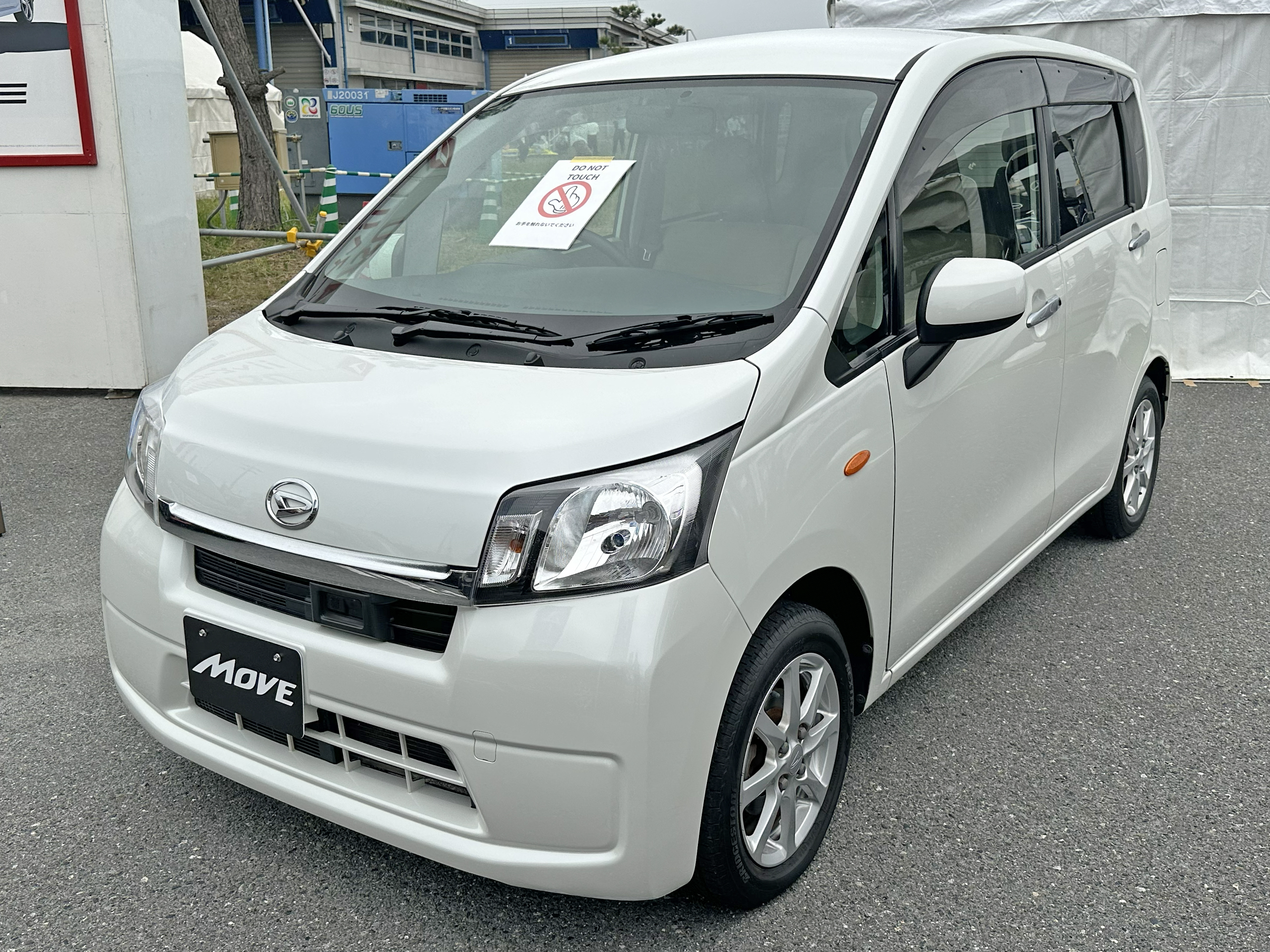
Daihatsu Move X SA (LA100S, facelift)

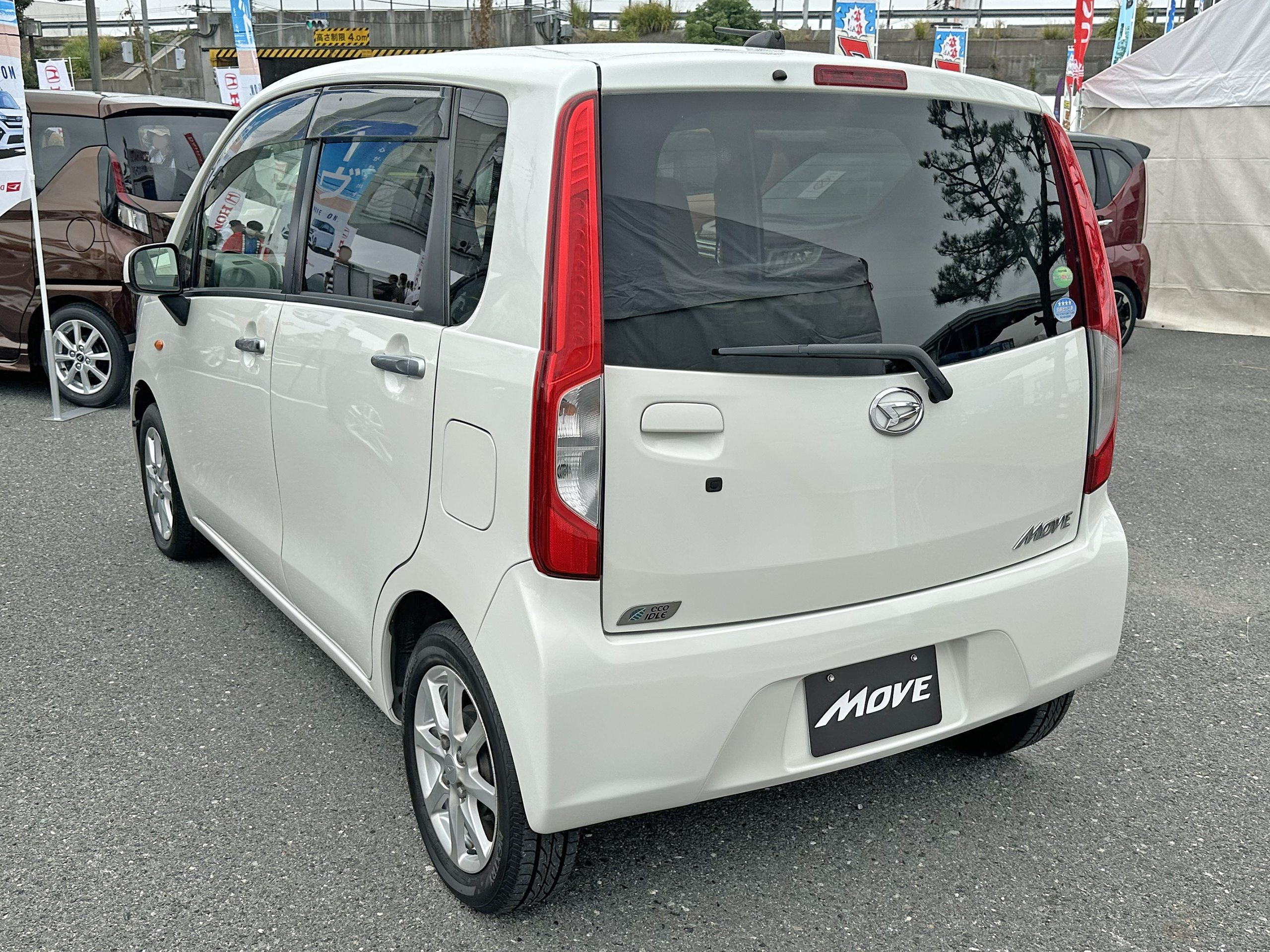
Daihatsu Move X SA (LA100S, facelift)

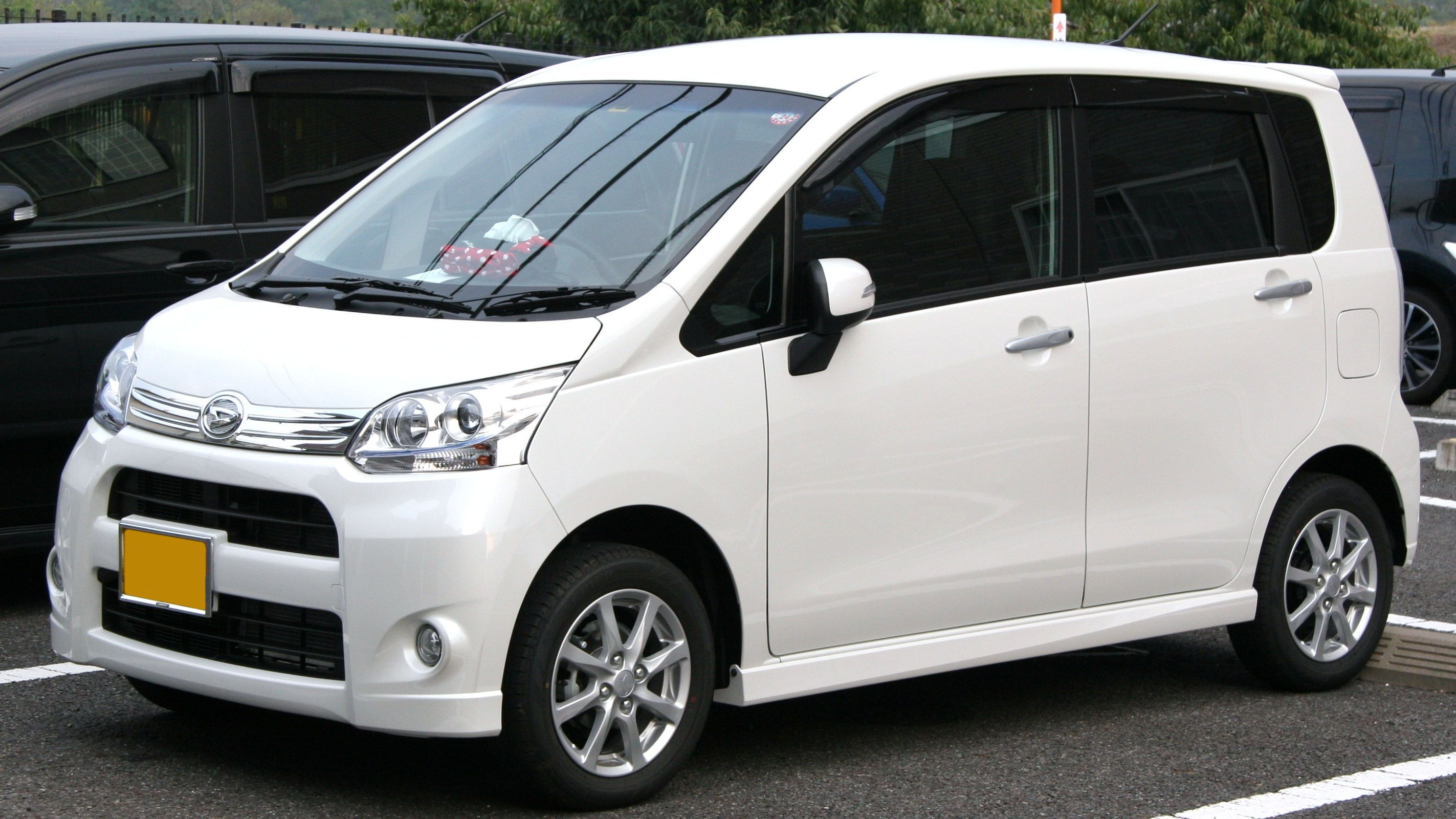
Daihatsu Move Custom X (LA100S, pre-facelift)

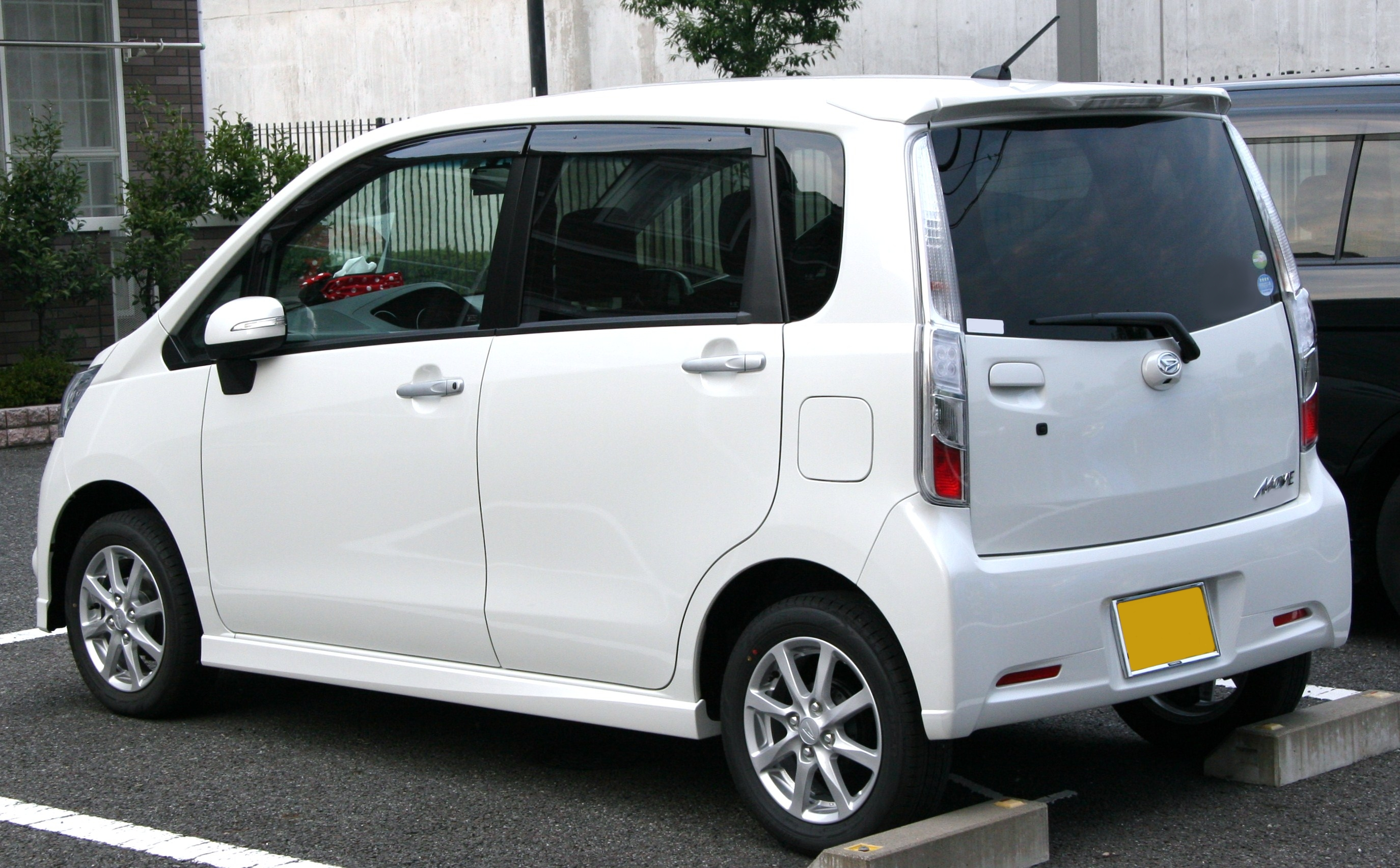
Daihatsu Move Custom X (LA100S, pre-facelift)

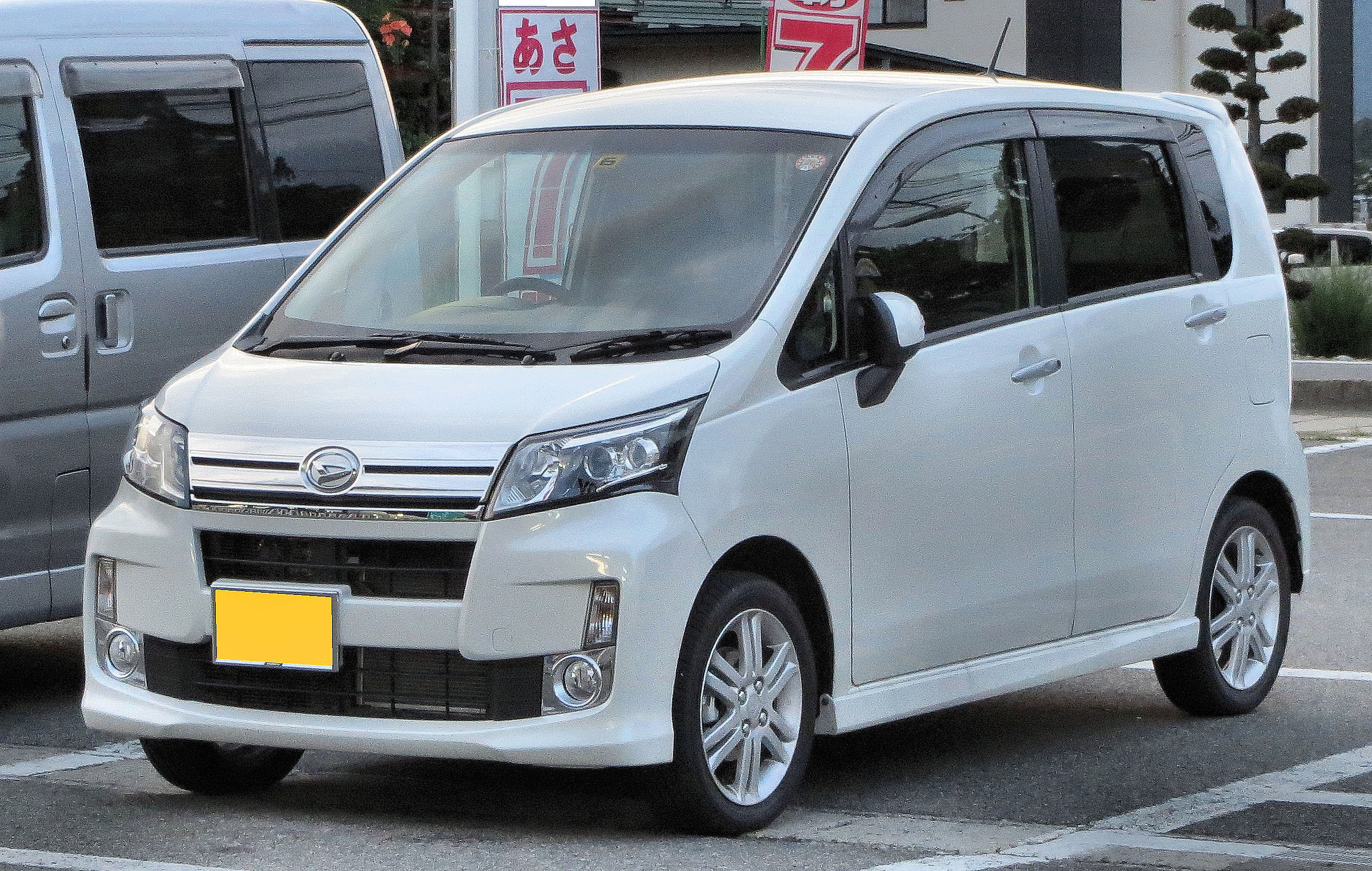
Daihatsu Move Custom (LA100S, facelift)

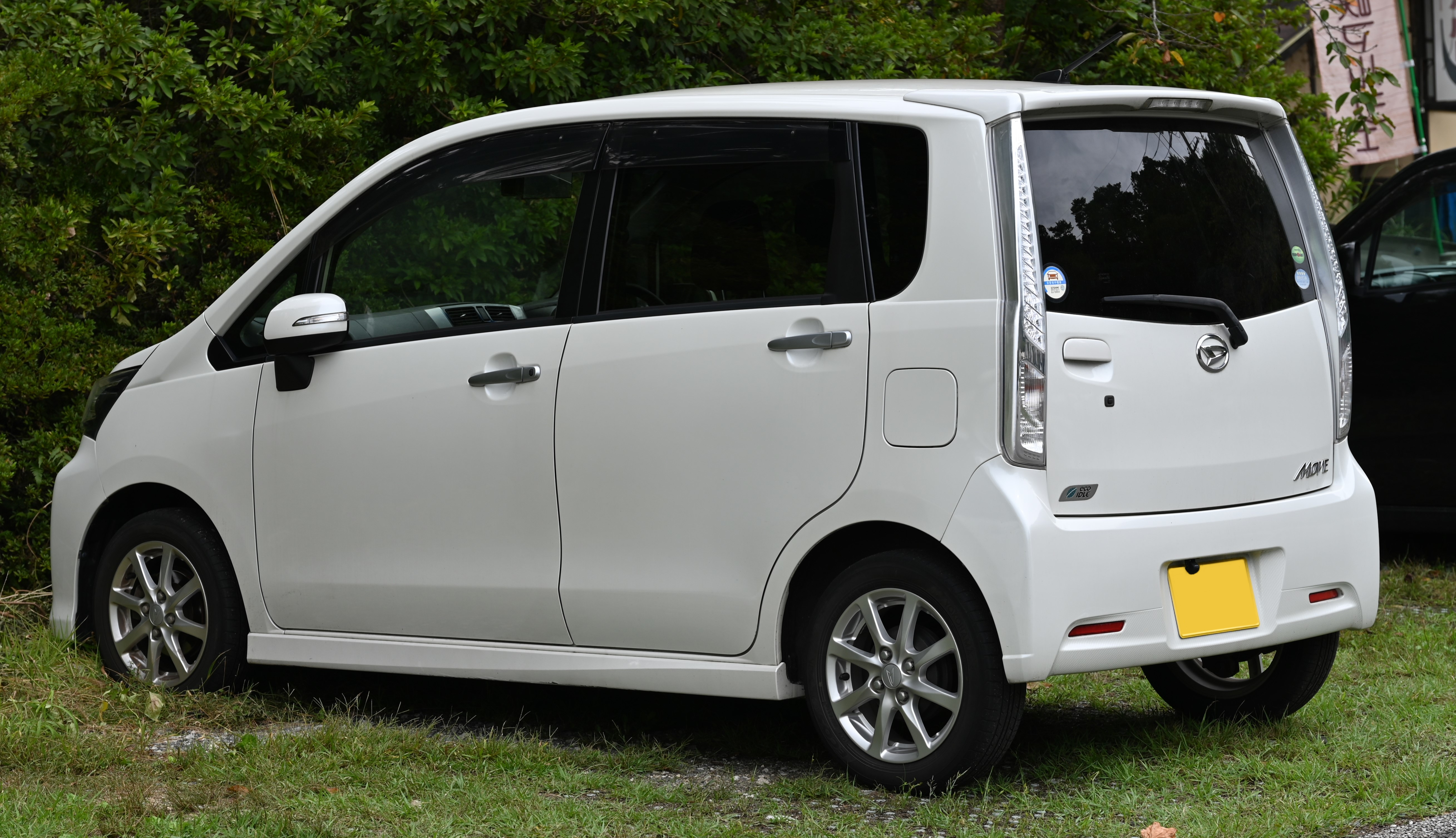
Daihatsu Move Custom (LA100S, facelift)

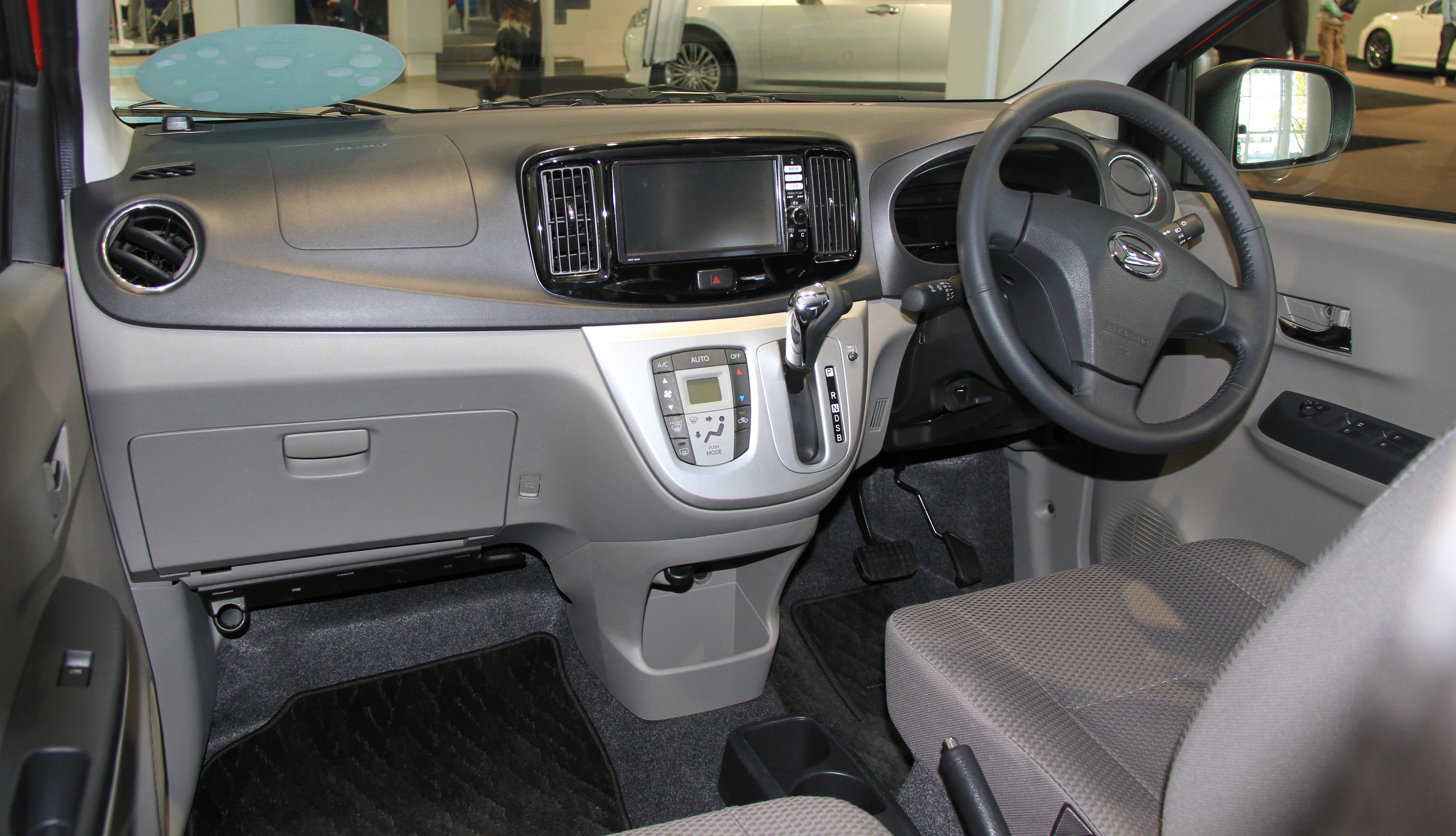
Interior

Subaru Stella

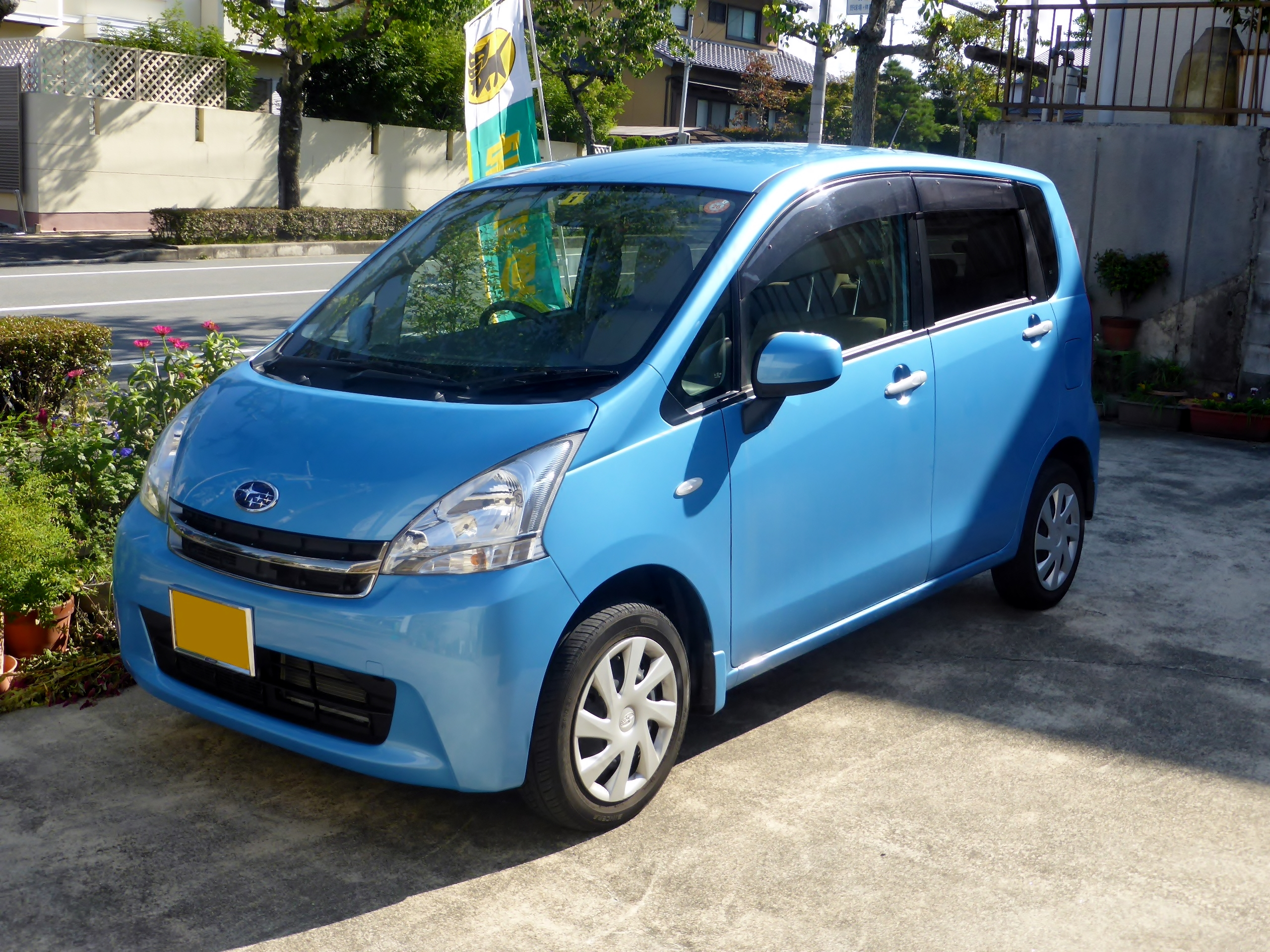
Subaru Stella L (LA100F, pre-facelift)

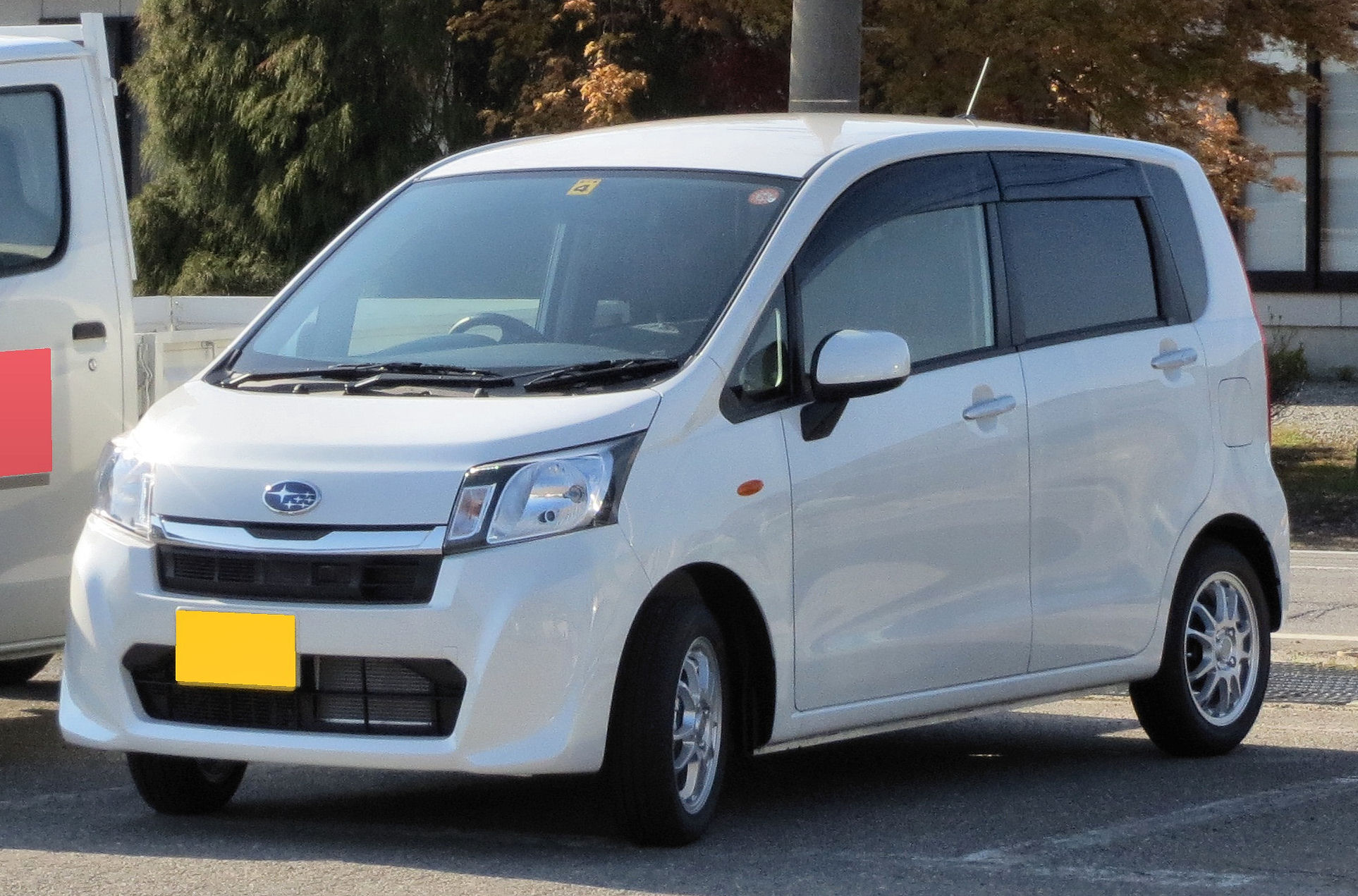
Subaru Stella L Limited (LA100F, facelift)

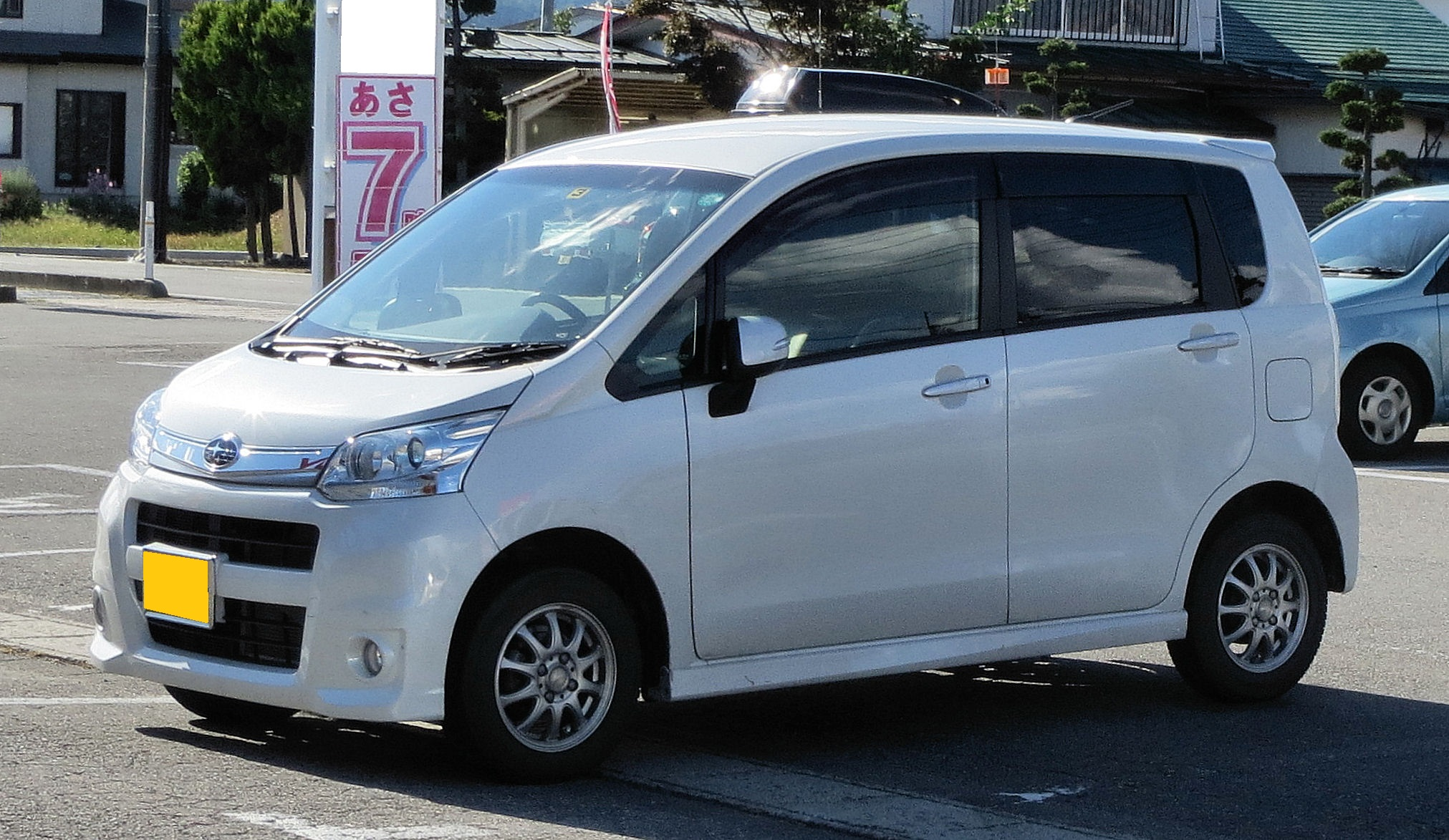
Subaru Stella Custom R (LA100F, pre-facelift)

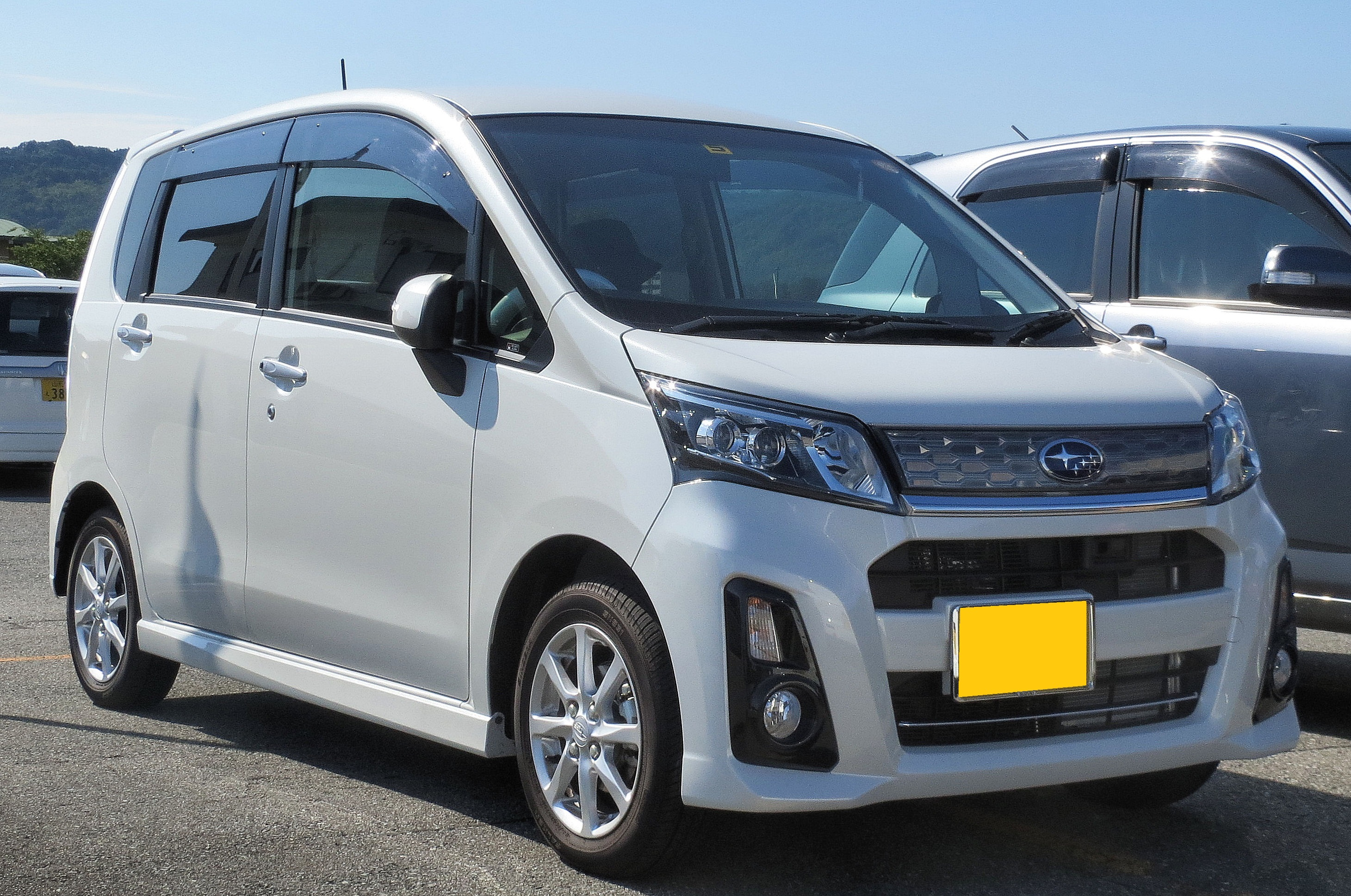
Subaru Stella Custom R SA 4WD (LA110F, facelift)

== Sixth generation (LA150; 2014) ==
Sixth generation
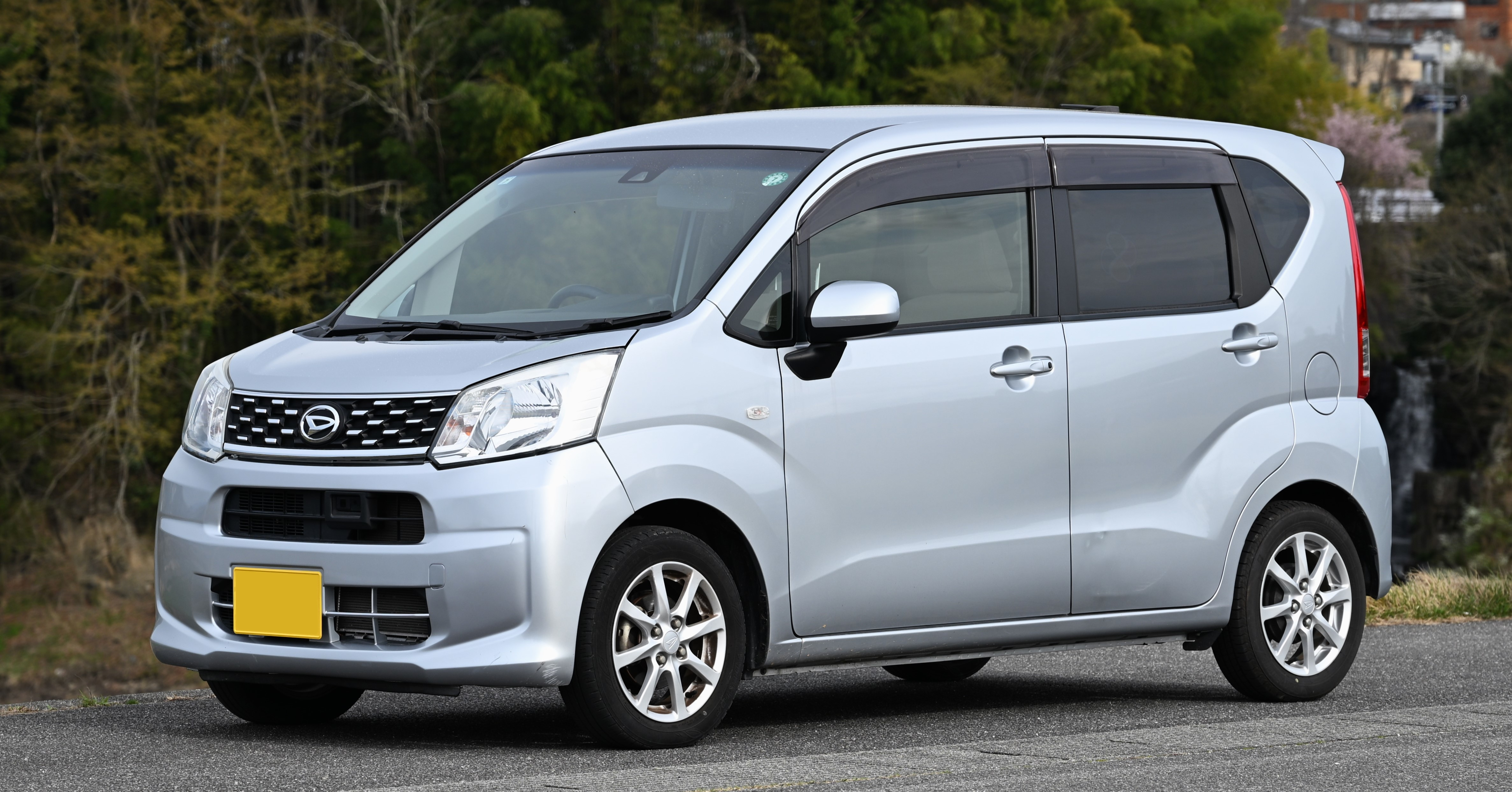
- Daihatsu Move X (LA150S)

Overview
- Model code: LA150
- Also called: Subaru Stella (third generation)
- Production: December 2014 – June 2023
- Assembly: Japan: Ryūō, Shiga (Ryūō plant); Nakatsu, Ōita (Daihatsu Motor Kyushu)

Body and chassis
- Body style: 5-door hatchback
- Related: Daihatsu Mira e:S (LA350)

Powertrain
- Engine: Petrol: 658 cc KF-VE I3; 658 cc KF-DET I3-T
- Power output: 43 kW (58 PS; 57 hp) (KF-VE); 47 kW (64 PS; 63 hp) (KF-DET)
- Transmission: CVT

Dimensions
- Wheelbase: 2,455 mm (96.7 in)
- Length: 3,395 mm (133.7 in)
- Width: 1,475 mm (58.1 in)
- Height: 1,630 mm (64.2 in)
- Kerb weight: 820–890 kg (1,808–1,962 lb) (Move); 830–900 kg (1,830–1,984 lb) (Move Custom)

The sixth-generation Move was introduced in Japan on 12 December 2014, along with the third-generation Stella. This generation features a lightweight high-rigidity body structure with a reinforced underbody, improved suspension system, and a power mode-switching steering switch that allows drivers to change the control of the engine and CVT at the touch of a button. It has a derivative called the Move Canbus.

Fuel economy is claimed at 31 km/L (88 mpg_{‑imp}; 73 mpg_{‑US}) while turbocharged models (Custom models only) delivering 27.4 km/L (77 mpg_{‑imp}; 64 mpg_{‑US}).

In October 2015, the 20th Anniversary Gold Edition SA II was unveiled. based on Custom RS SA II grade, featuring 20th anniversary emblems, gold-painted front grille, door handles, and gold-painted alumunium wheels.

In August 2017, the Move get a minor facelift. The grade lineup has been simplified, with the Move now offering five grades: L, L "SA III", X, X "SA III", and X Turbo SA III, while the Custom offered three grades: X, X Limited SA III.

The sixth-generation Move was discontinued on 29 June 2023 along with several other Daihatsu models, amidst the scandal involving rigged safety tests at Daihatsu.

Daihatsu Move

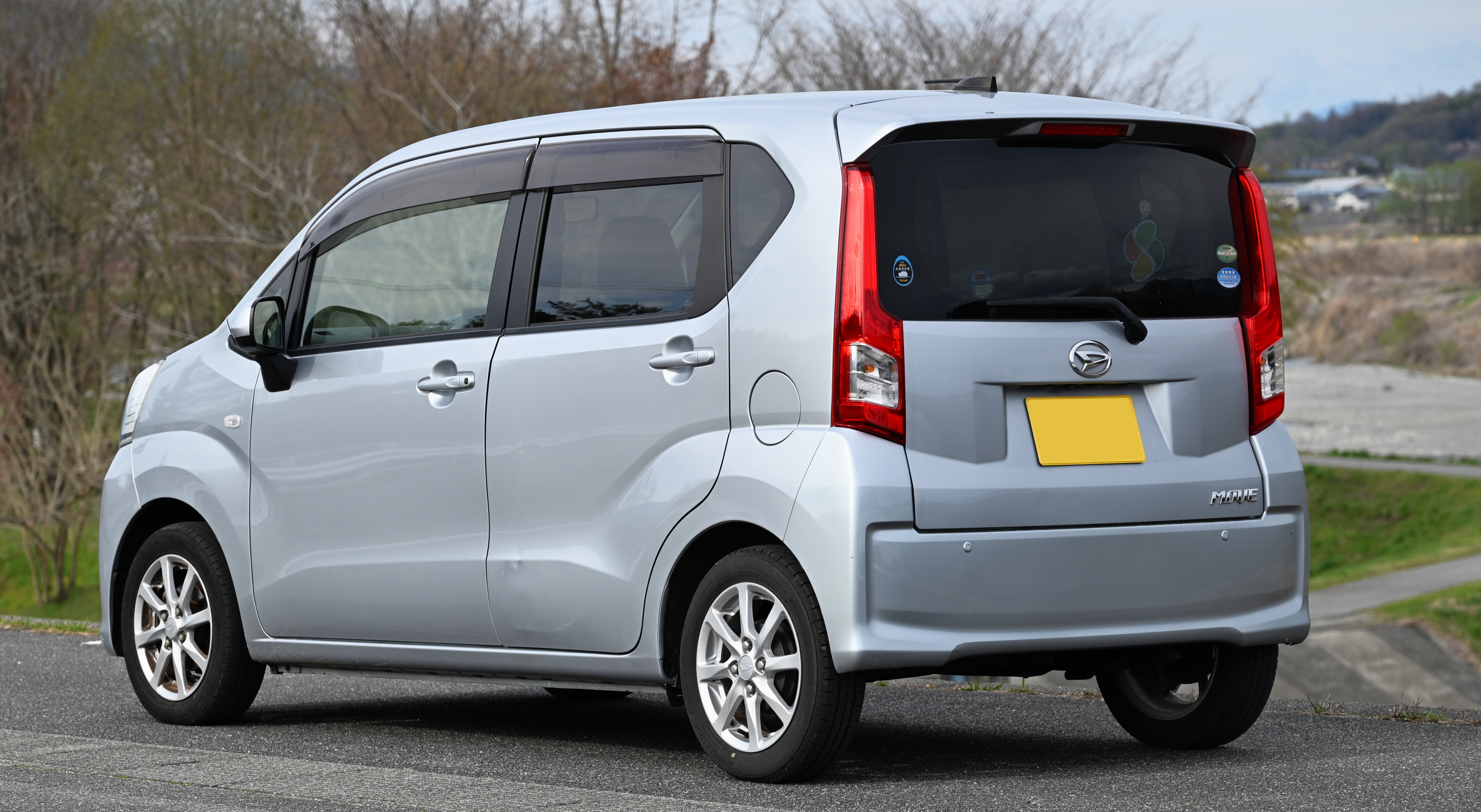
Daihatsu Move X (LA150S)

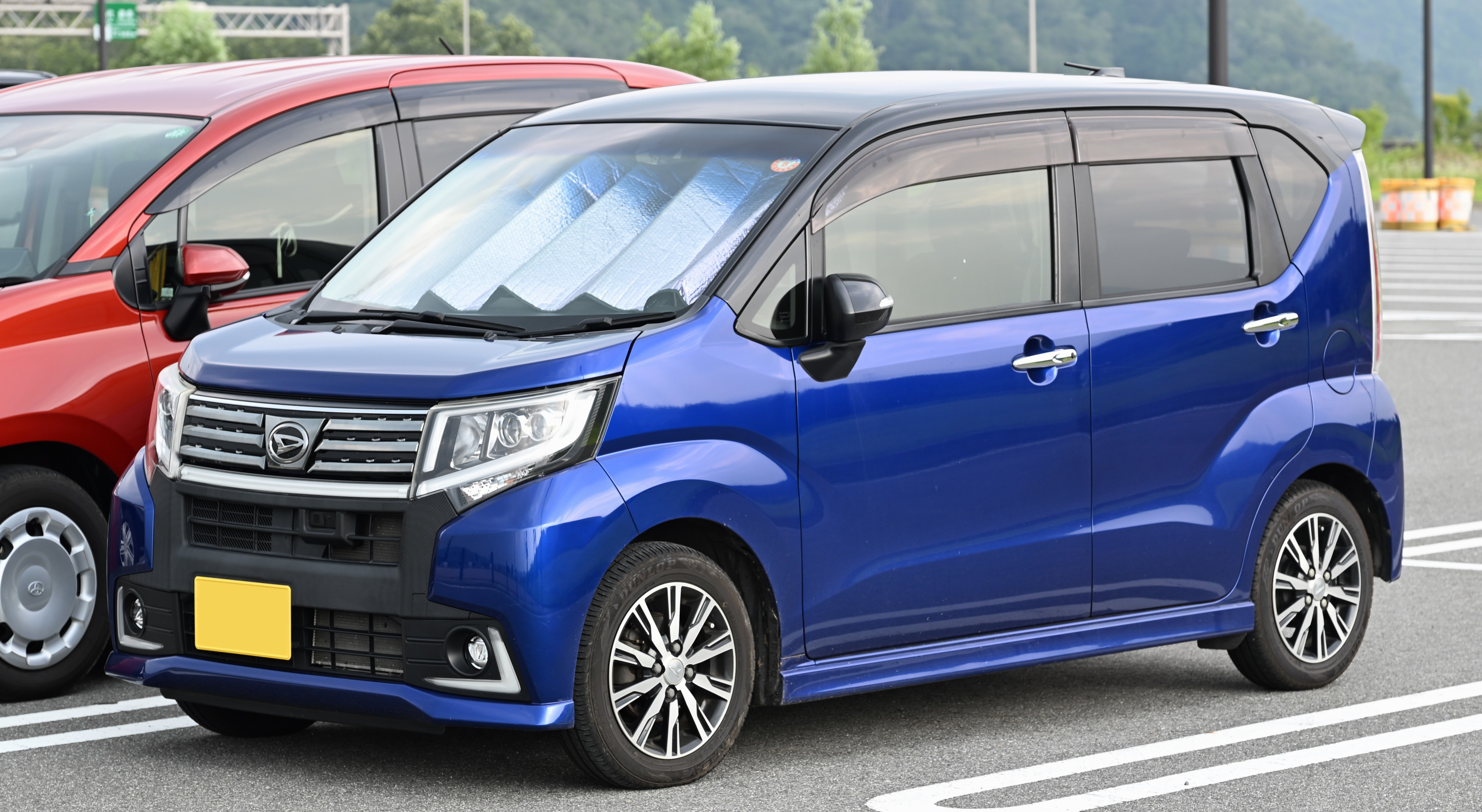
Daihatsu Move Custom X Hyper (LA150S, pre-facelift)

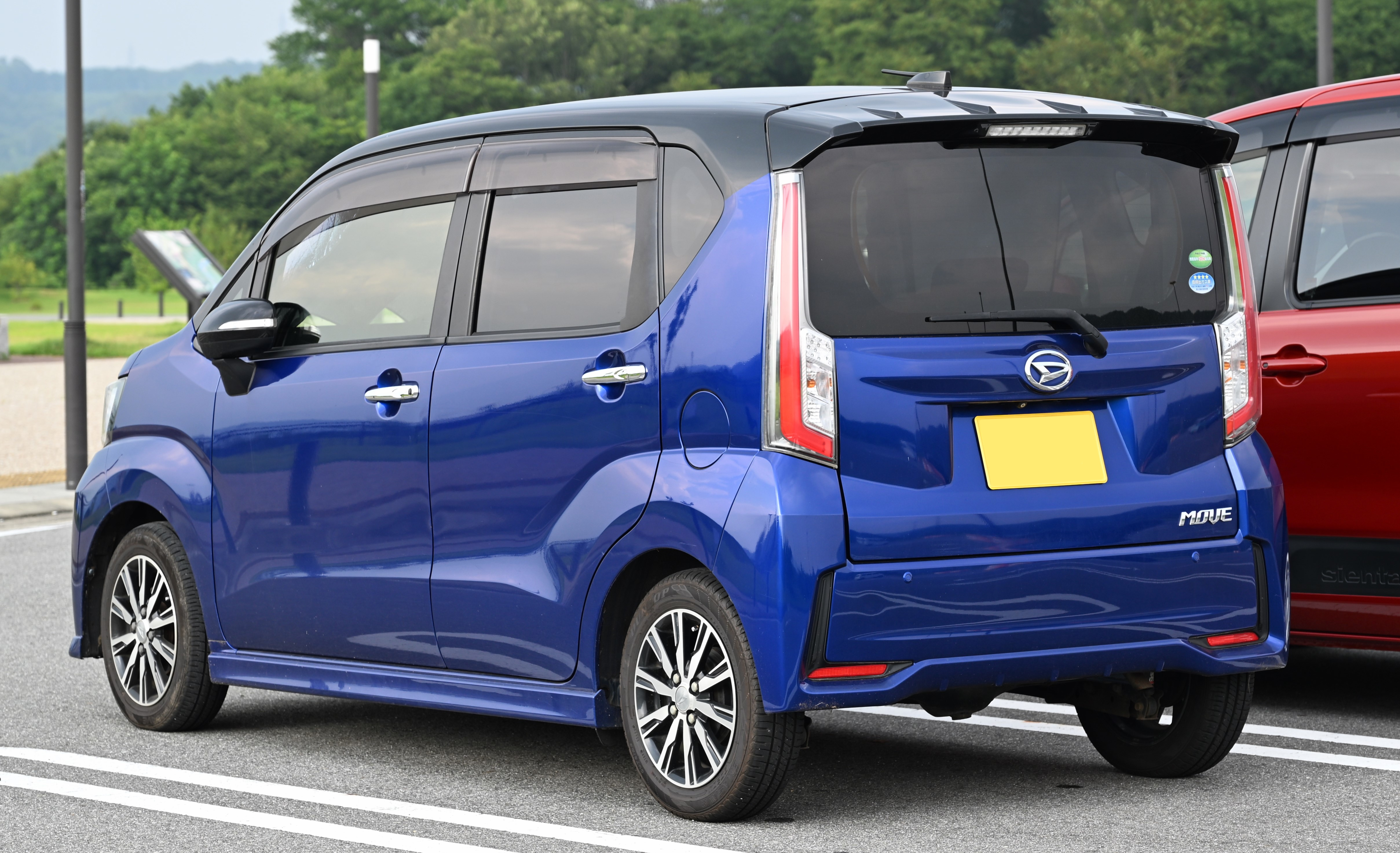
Daihatsu Move Custom X Hyper (LA150S, pre-facelift)

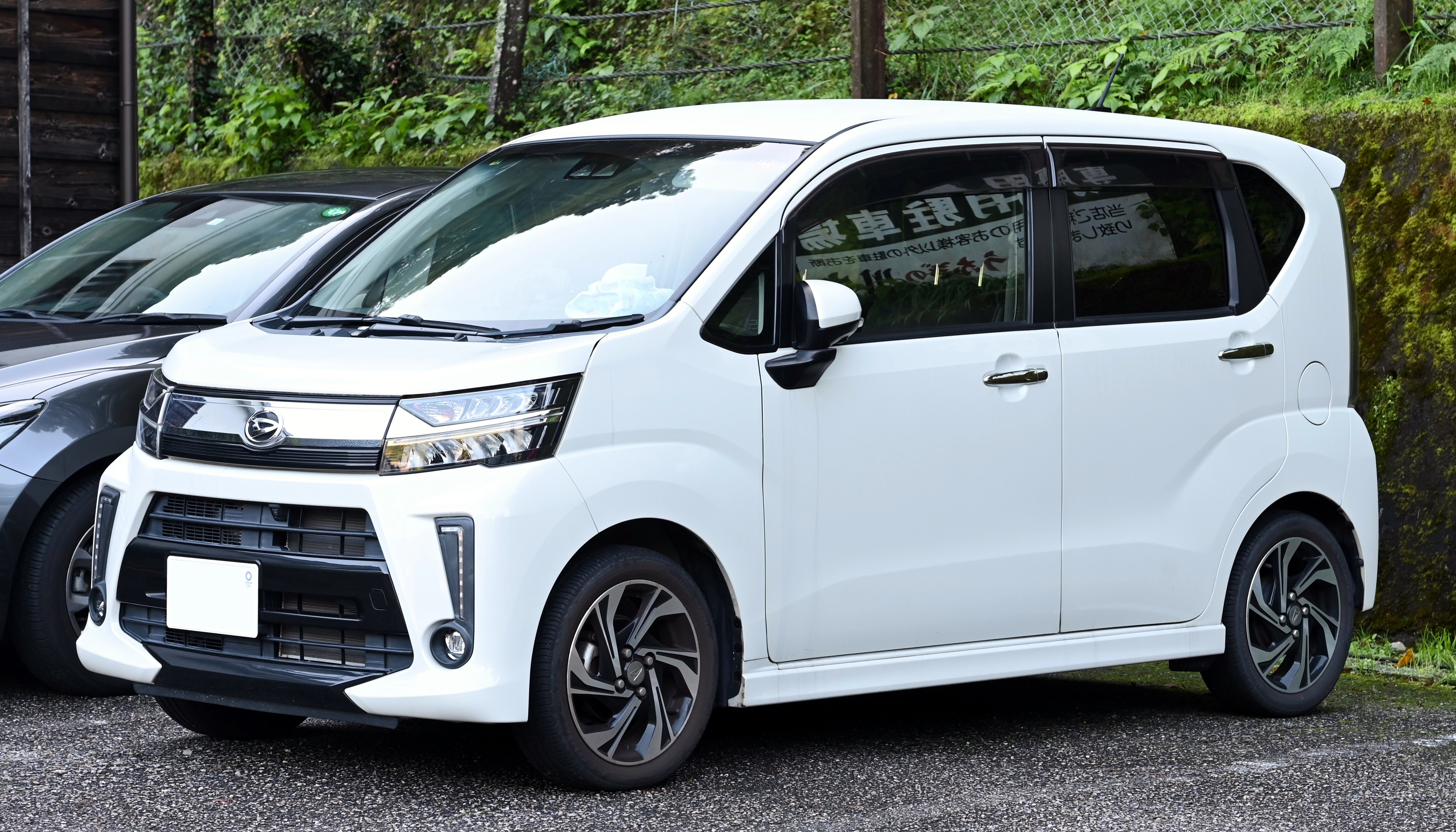
Daihatsu Move Custom RS (LA150S, facelift)

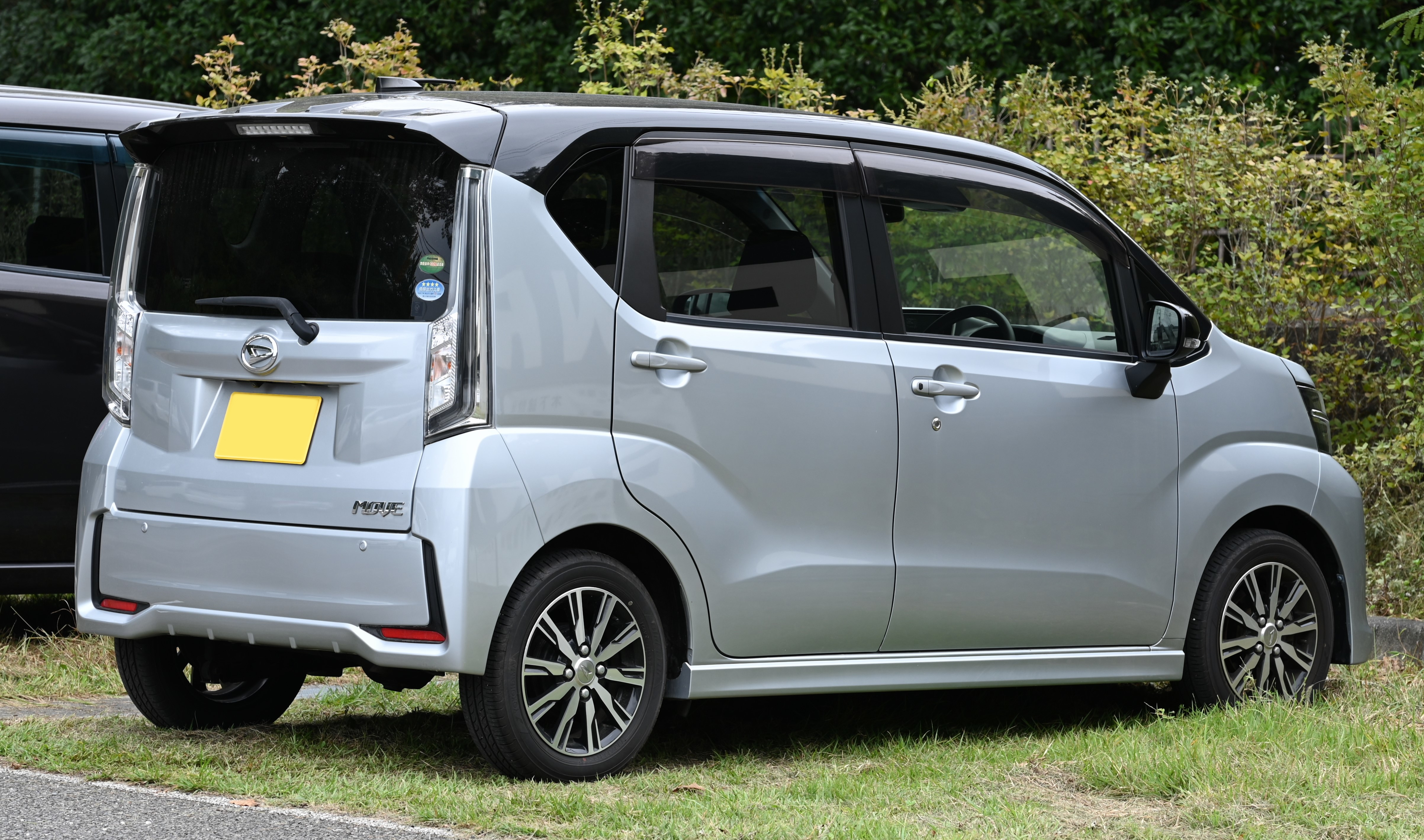
Daihatsu Move Custom (LA150S, facelift)

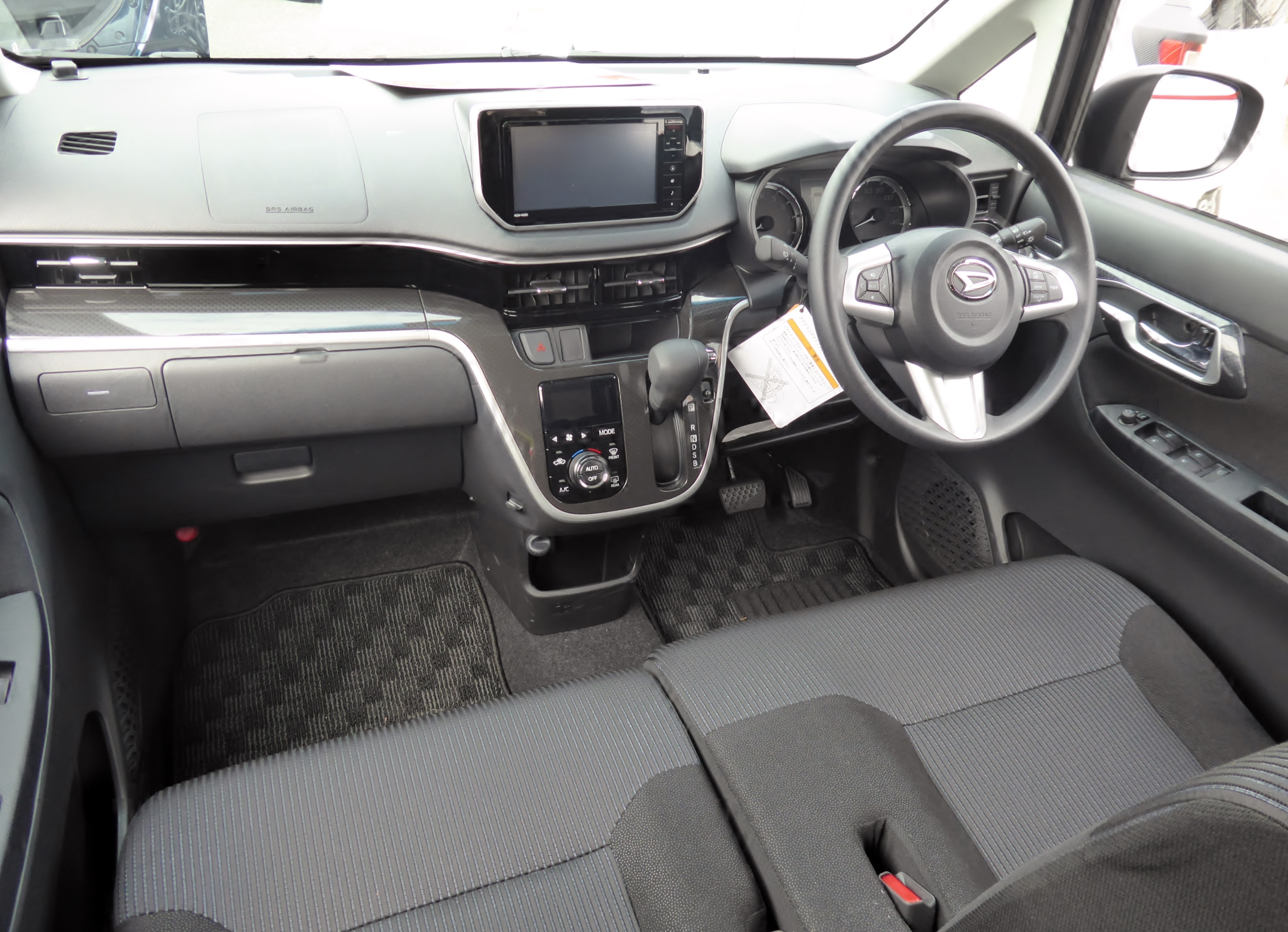
Move Custom Interior (facelift)

Subaru Stella

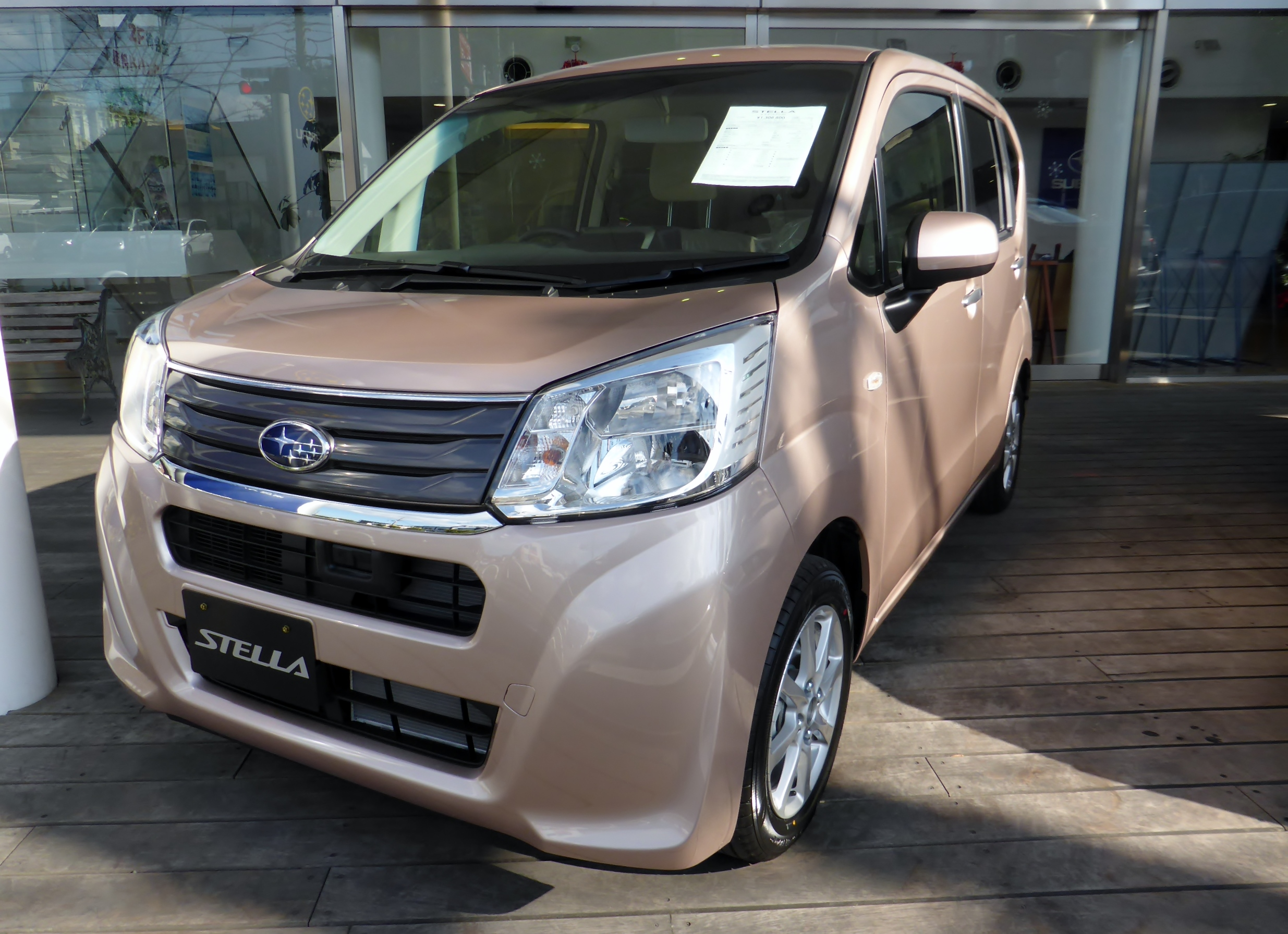
Subaru Stella G SA (LA150F)

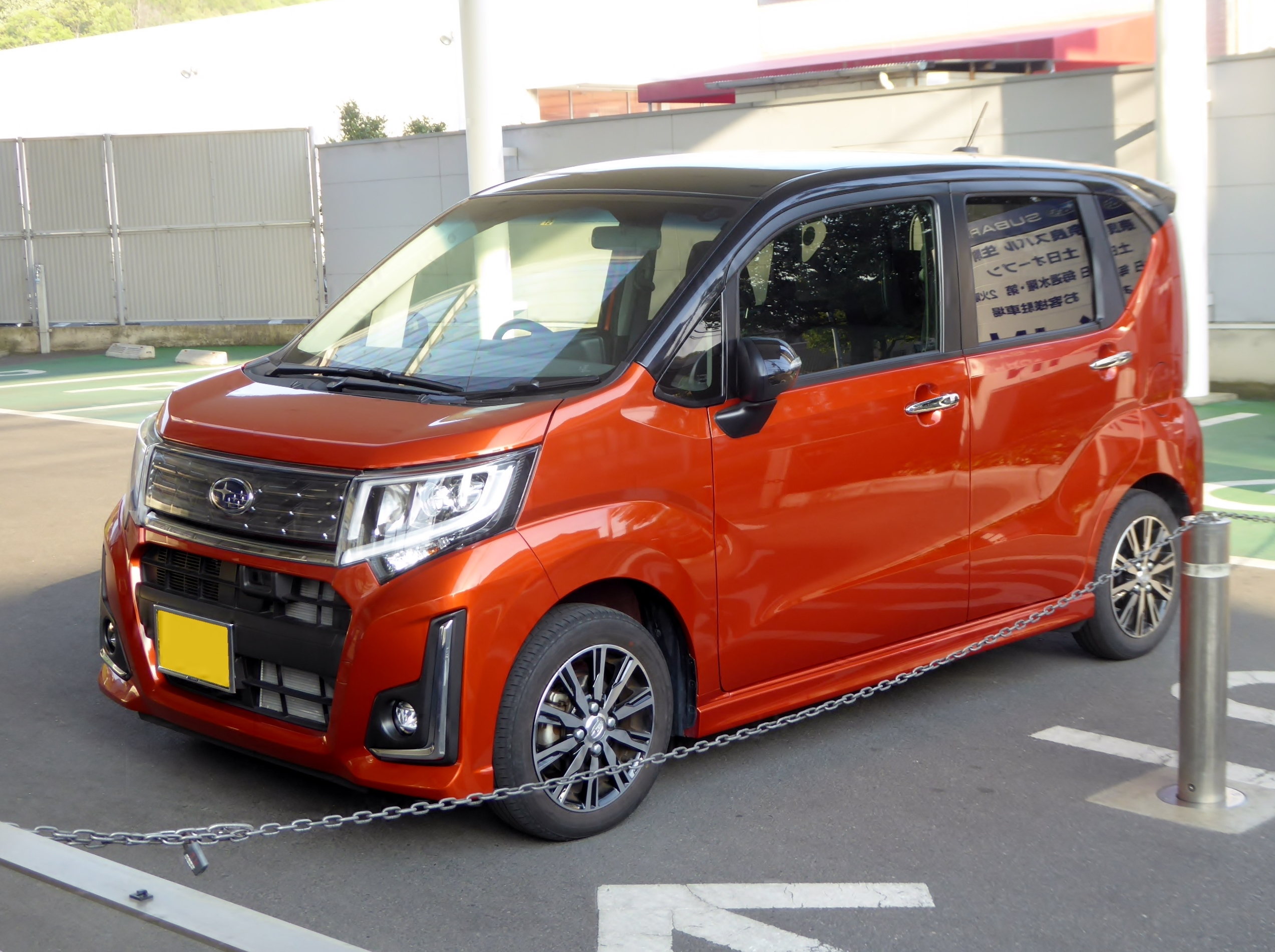
Subaru Stella Custom RS SA (LA150F, pre-facelift)

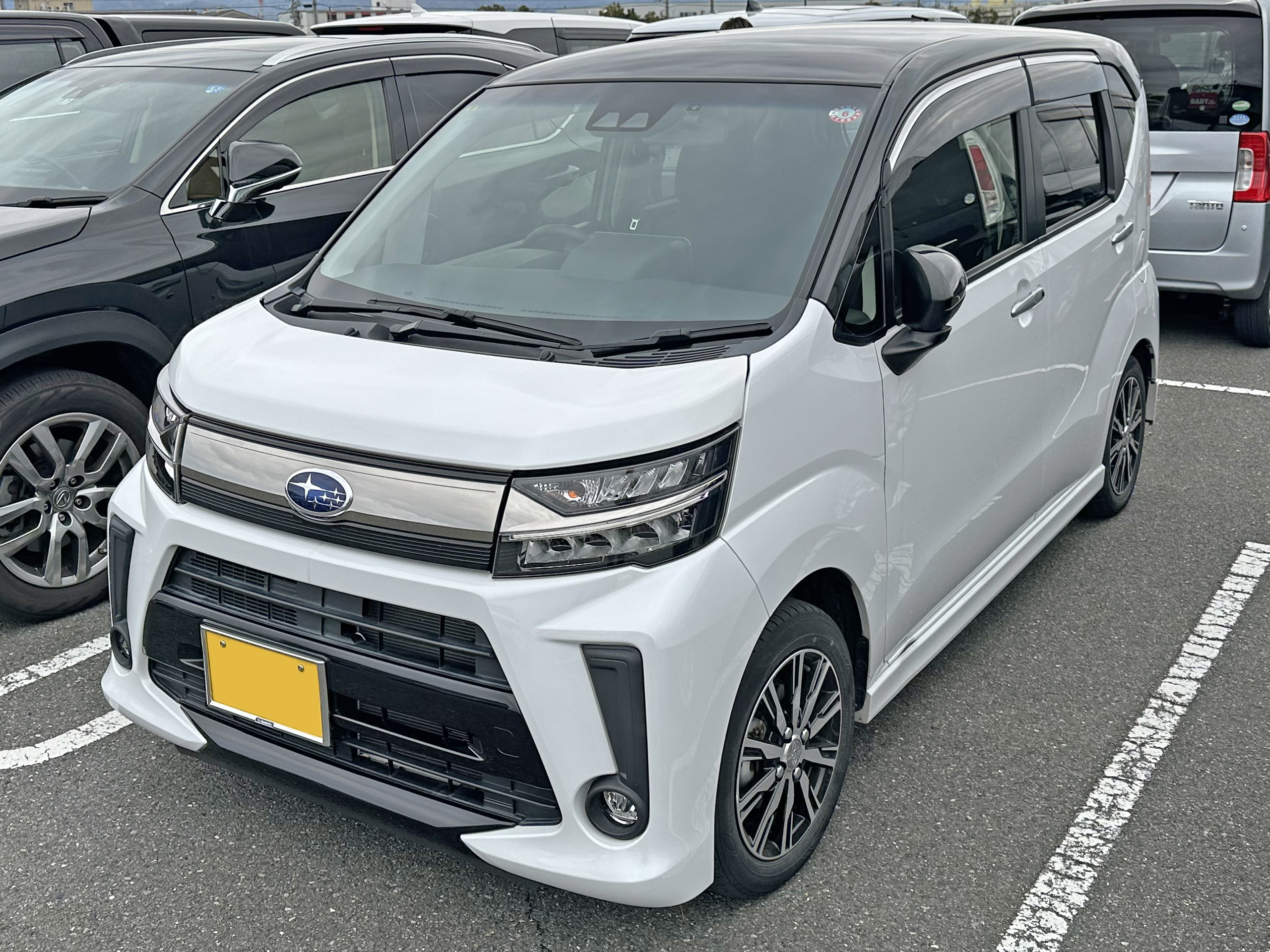
Subaru Stella Custom R SA (LA150F, facelift)

== Seventh generation (LA850S/860S; 2025) ==
Seventh generation
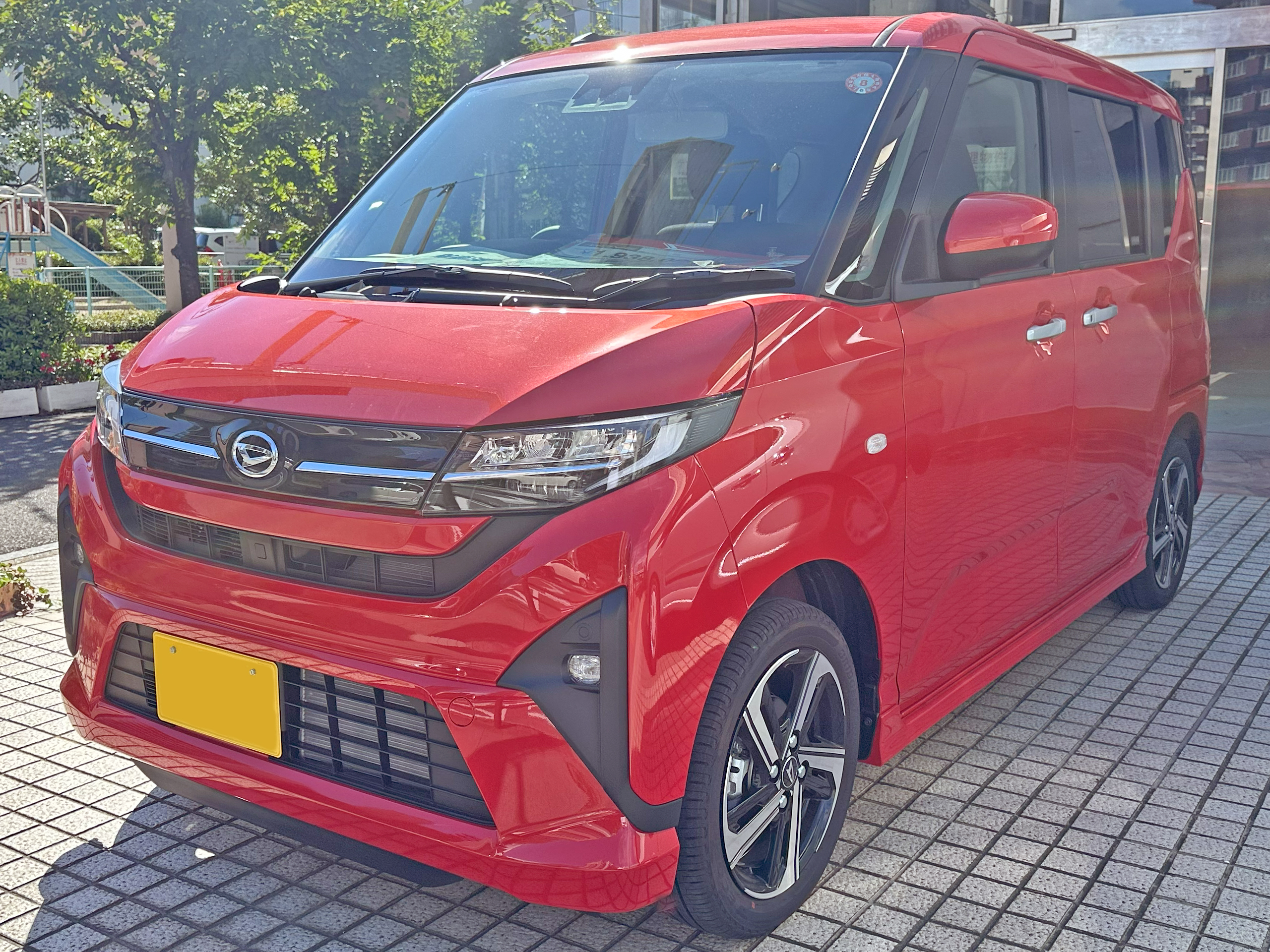
- Daihatsu Move (LA850S)

Overview
- Model code: LA850S; LA860S (4WD)
- Also called: Subaru Stella (fourth generation)
- Production: 2025–present
- Assembly: Japan: Nakatsu, Ōita (Daihatsu Motor Kyushu)

Body and chassis
- Body style: 5-door microvan
- Platform: Daihatsu New Global Architecture (DNGA)
- Doors: Sliding doors (rear)
- Related: Daihatsu Move Canbus (LA850/860S); Daihatsu Tanto (LA650)

Powertrain
- Engine: Petrol: 658 cc KF-VE I3; 658 cc KF-DET turbo I3
- Power output: 38 kW (51 hp; 52 PS) (KF-VE); 47 kW (63 hp; 64 PS) (KF-DET)
- Transmission: CVT

Dimensions
- Wheelbase: 2,460 mm (96.9 in)
- Length: 3,395 mm (133.7 in)
- Width: 1,475 mm (58.1 in)
- Height: 1,655–1,670 mm (65.2–65.7 in)
- Kerb weight: 860–940 kg (1,896–2,072 lb)

The seventh-generation Move went on sale since 5 June 2025. Contrary to previous generations, this model is a microvan with rear sliding doors and is based on the Daihatsu New Global Architecture platform.

The Move features an X-shaped design for its front fascia along with slim headlights connected to the grille, L-shaped vertical taillights. For the first time in the model history, the Move features rear sliding doors which comes standard for all trims (except the entry-level L trim) with a powered feature for the doors and a touch-and-go lock system.

Inside, the interior was designed for utility with four-seat configuration and many storage spaces, includes a storage area below the central air vents for the wireless charging pad. There is a new digital panel used for the HVAC system, a redesigned steering wheel, a touchscreen infotainment system (7, 9, or 10 inches) and the high mounted gear selector next to the HVAC controls.

The both G and RS grades offer an Another Style option, which combines manufacturer and dealer options that can only be set when ordering the vehicle. Two styles are available: the Dandy Sport Style, which consists of black exterior parts, and the Noble Chic Style, which features copper accents on the exterior and interior parts.

The rebadged model, Stella was introduced on 12 June 2025, a week after the Move was released.

Initially, it was planned to be the LA120/130S model, but due to the certification fraud issue, it ended up receiving same model code as the Move Canbus, which underwent a full model change to its second generation earlier.

Daihatsu Move

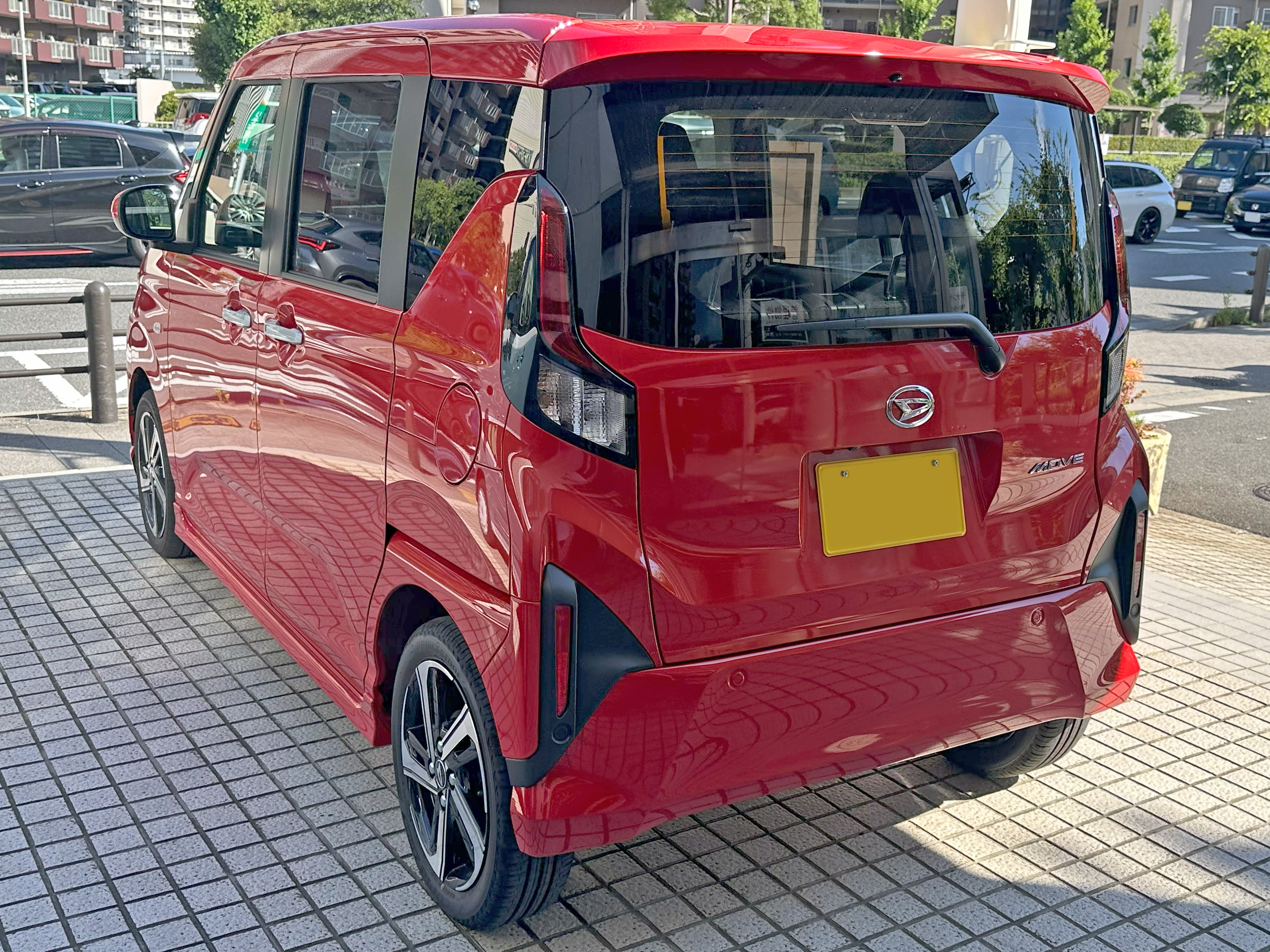
Daihatsu Move RS (LA850S)

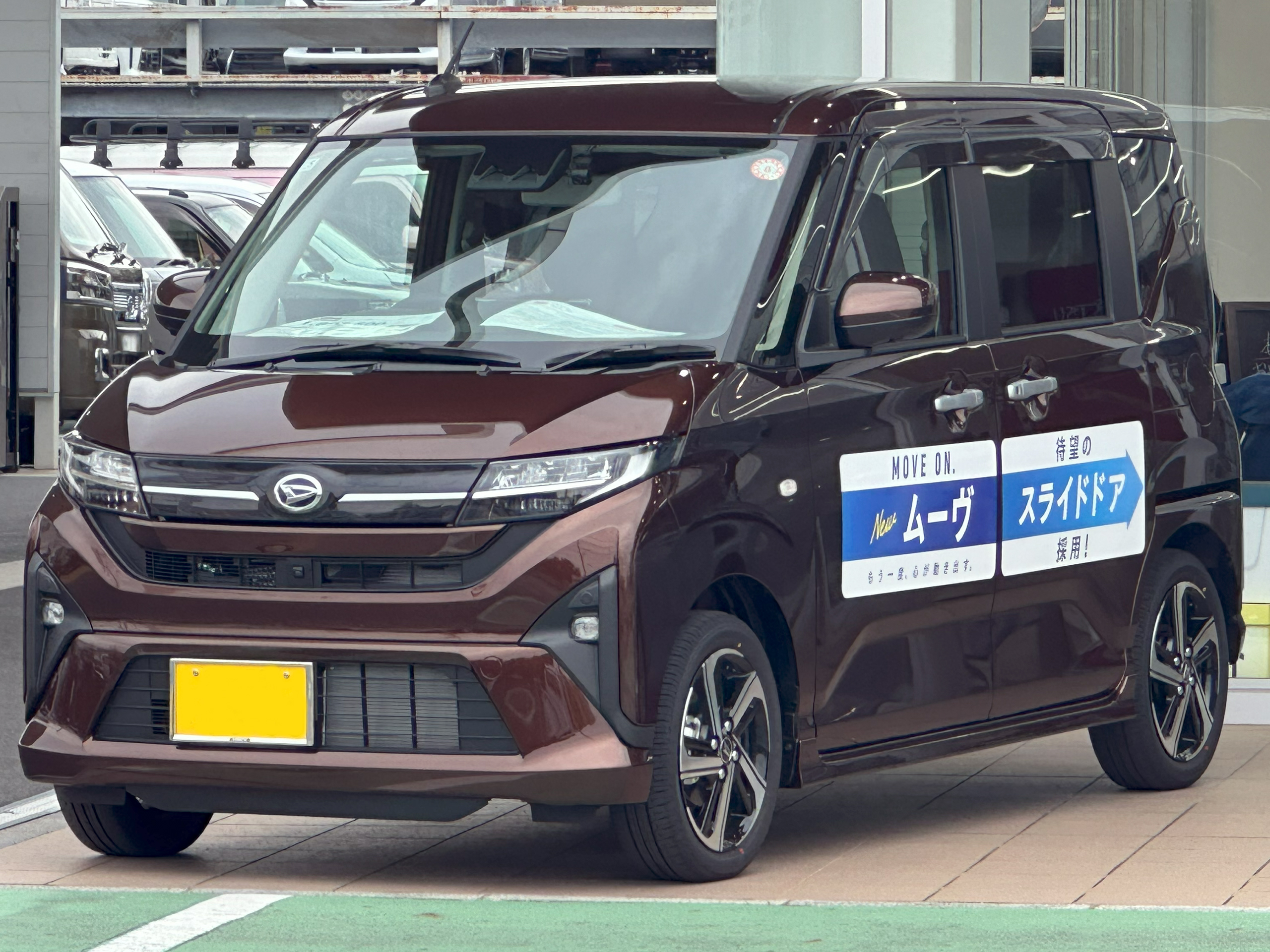
Daihatsu Move RS 2WD (LA850S)

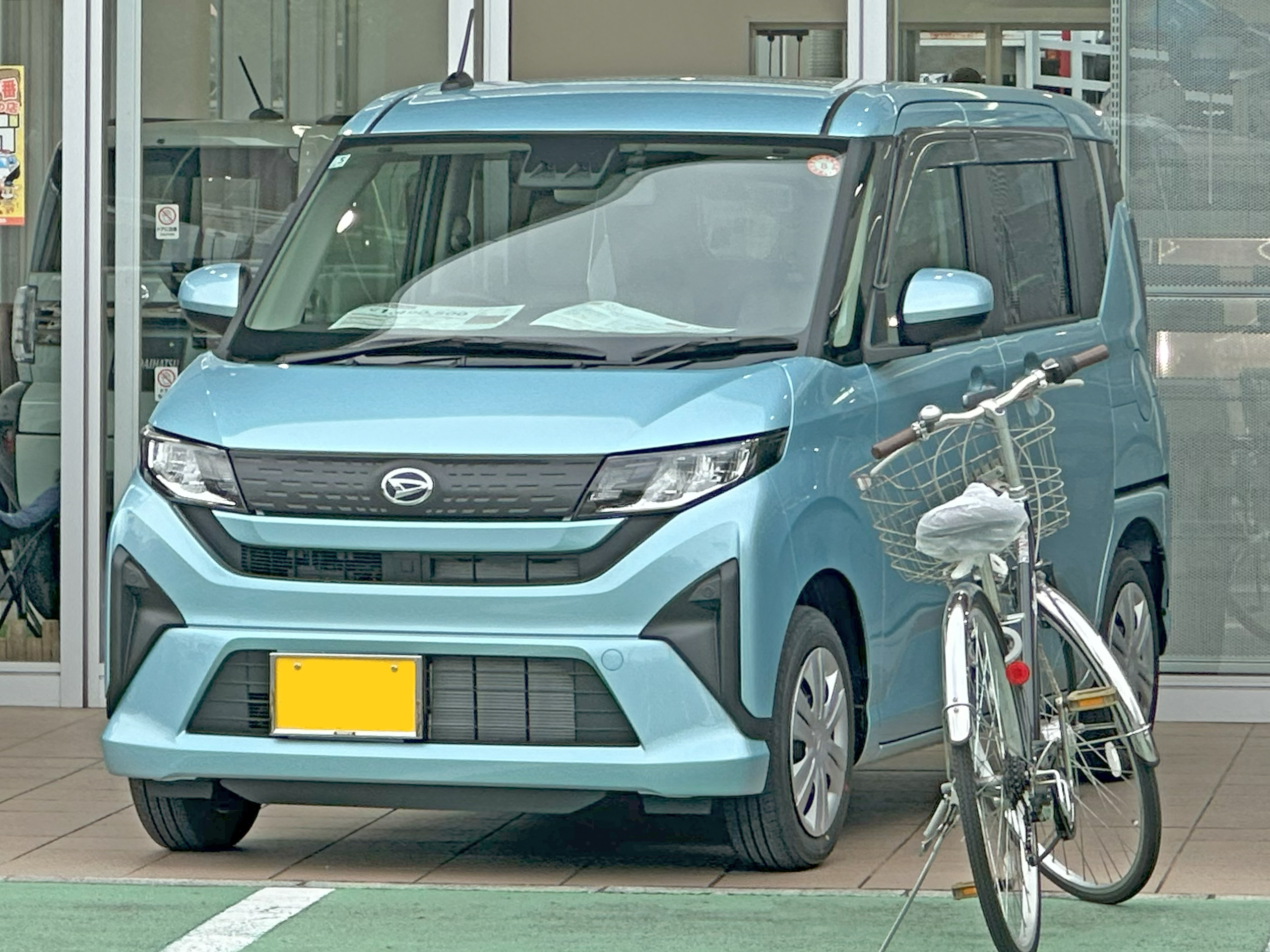
Daihatsu Move X

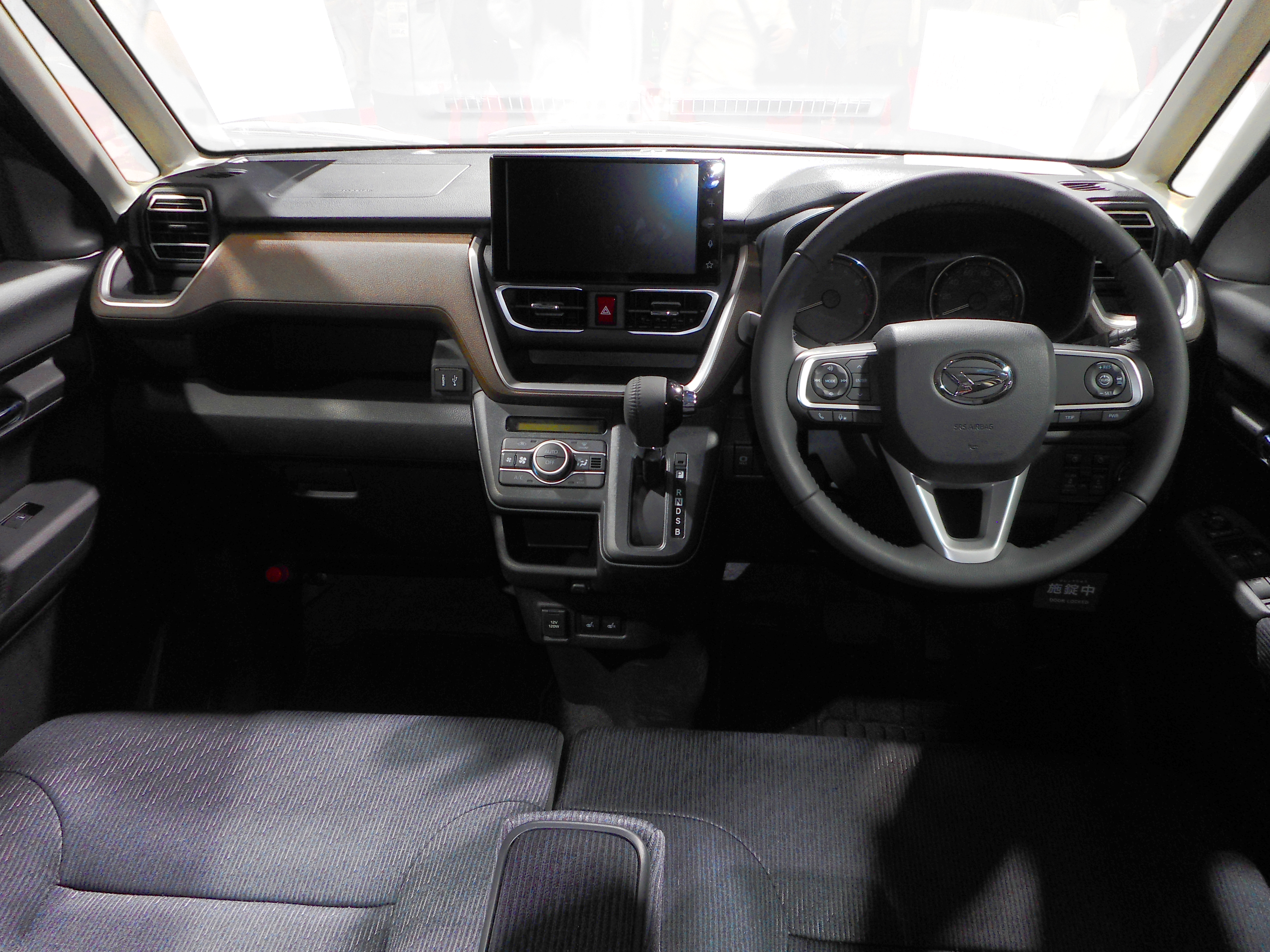
Move RS interior

Subaru Stella

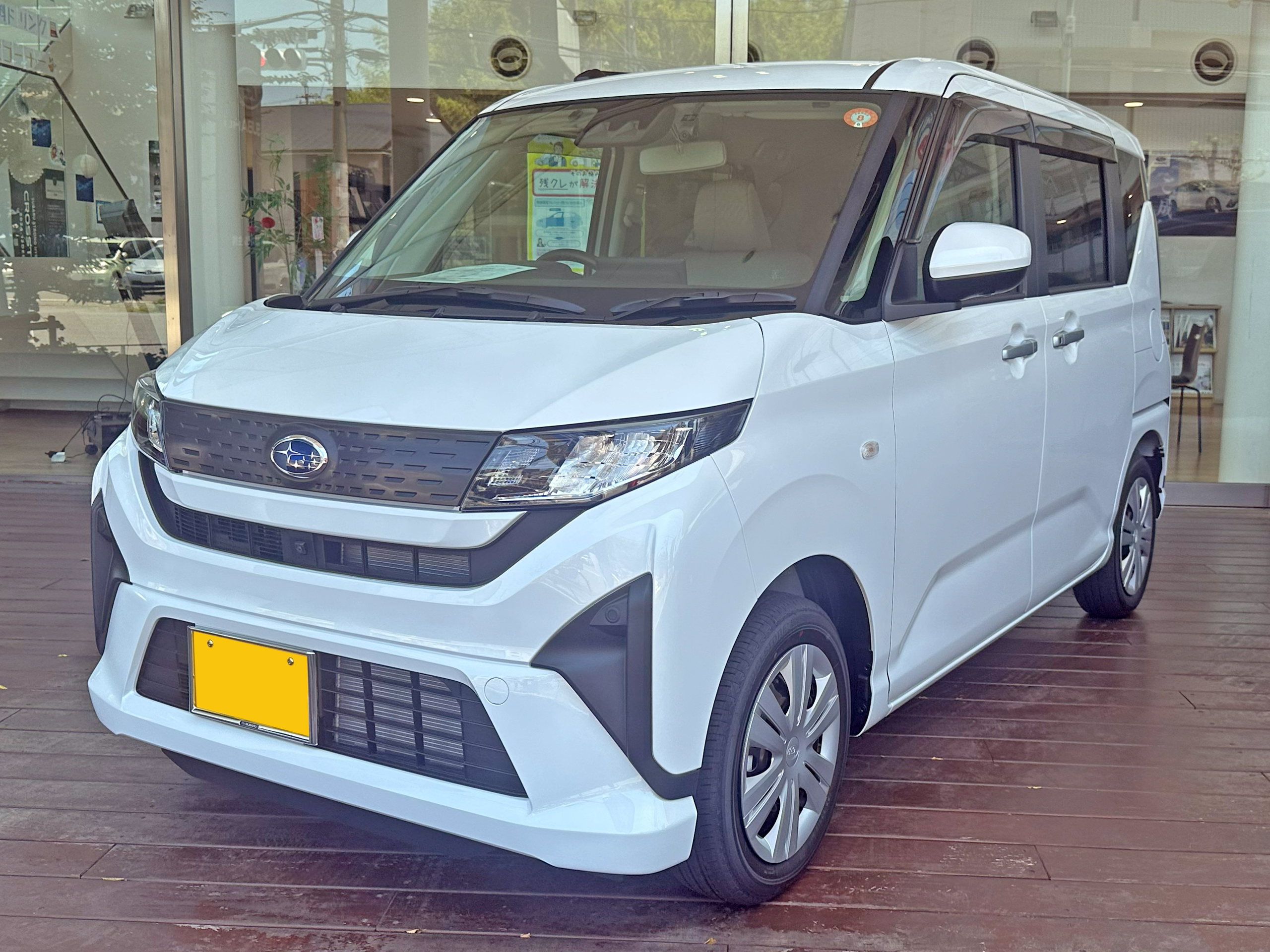
Subaru Stella G

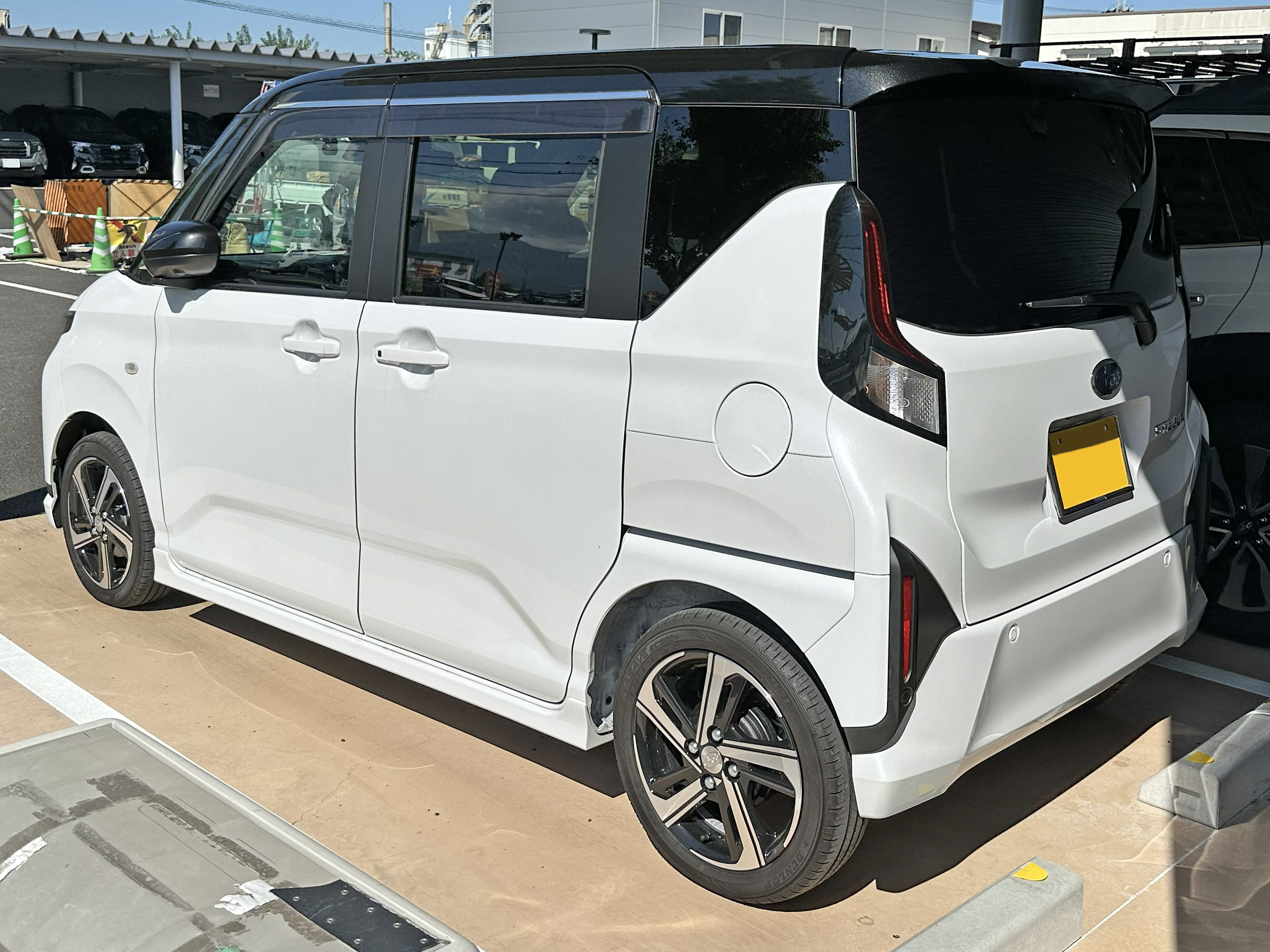
Subaru Stella ZS

== International markets ==
In Malaysia, Perodua manufactured a version of the Move called the Kenari.

In China, the FAW Tianjin joint venture between First Automotive Works and Toyota produces a petrol and electrical version of the Move. The electric version was exported to the US as the Miles ZX40.

The first two generation Moves were also exported to Europe, where they also went by the Japanese market name. Due to relatively poor sales, Daihatsu did not export the third and succeeding generations Moves to Europe as the brand departed from the continent, making it strictly a Japanese domestic market model.

== Sales ==
Year	Japan
2010	86,031
2011	106,746
2012	107,710
2013	174,454
2014	112,995
2015	109,013
2016	66,663
2017	62,997
2018	61,565
2019	54,343
2020	46,951
2021	37,498
2022	39,003
2023	21,117
